= Ahnfelt =

Ahnfelt is a Swedish surname. It may refer to:

- Astrid Ahnfelt (1876–1962), Swedish author, translator, foreign correspondent
- Oscar Ahnfelt (1813–1882), Swedish singer, composer and music publisher
- Sigmund Ahnfelt (1915–1993), Swedish major general
