= Rheborg =

Rheborg is a Swedish surname. Notable people with the surname include:

- Johan Rheborg (born 1963), Swedish comedian, actor, and script writer
- Rolf Rheborg (1922–1983), Swedish Navy rear admiral
