= Gustaf Welin =

Swedish Army officer

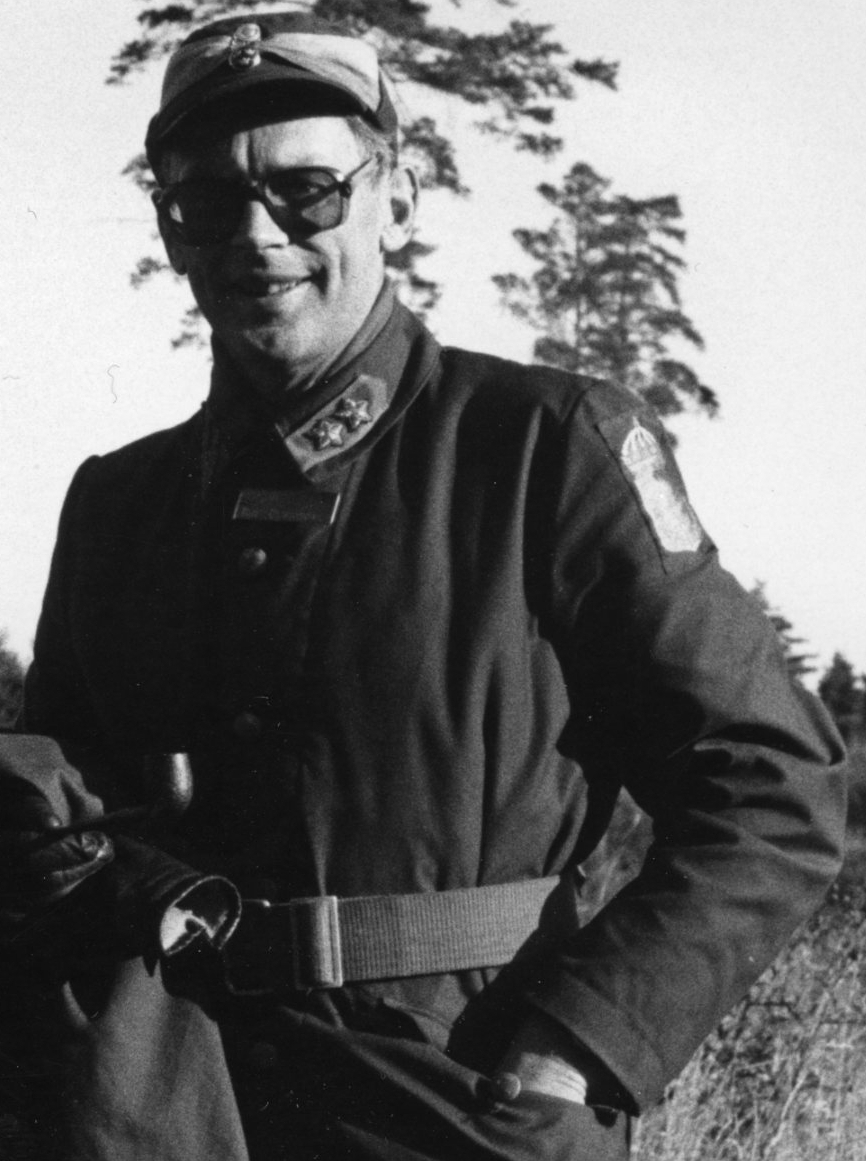
- Welin as major general.
- Born: Nils Gustaf Axel Welin; 12 July 1930; Gothenburg, Sweden
- Died: 11 November 2008 (aged 78); Stockholm, Sweden
- Burial place: Solna Cemetery
- Military career
- Allegiance: Sweden
- Branch: Swedish Army
- Service years: 1952–1992
- Rank: Lieutenant General
- Commands: Värmland Brigade; Chief of Staff, Milo V; Chief of Staff, Milo Ö; National Defence College; UNDOF; Southern Military District
- Conflicts: Cyprus dispute Arab–Israeli conflict

Lieutenant General Nils Gustaf Axel Welin (12 July 1930 – 11 November 2008) was a senior Swedish Army officer. Welin served as head of the Swedish National Defence College (1984–1987), as Force Commander of the United Nations Disengagement Observer Force (UNDOF) (1986–1988) and as Commanding General of the Southern Military District (1988–1992).

== Early life ==
Welin was born on 12 July 1930 in Vasa Parish) in Gothenburg, Gothenburg and Bohus County, Sweden the son of Colonel Axel Welin and his wife Märta (née Löfgren). His father was born in Stockholm and participated in the Winter War as chief engineer in the Swedish Volunteer Corps. He later became commander of the Svea Engineer Corps/Regiment (1953–1959) in Stockholm, and his mother was a board member of the Right-Wing Party's and later the Moderate Party's women's association in Engelbrekt Parish, as well as served for many years as a juror in the Stockholm District Court. His sister Birgitta was a librarian in Vaxholm and was married to the Justice of the Supreme Court of Sweden Tor Sverne. After Welin's family moved to Stockholm, he passed studentexamen at Norra Real in 1949.

== Career ==
Welin was commissioned as an officer in 1952 and was assigned as a second lieutenant to the Svea Life Guards. He attended the Swedish Armed Forces Staff College from 1960 to 1962, served as captain in the Defence Staff in 1964 and in Västerbotten Regiment in 1967. He then served as company commander with the United Nations in Cyprus, part of the United Nations Peacekeeping Force in Cyprus (UNFICYP) from 1967 to 1968. Welin attended the Swedish Armed Forces Staff College in 1968 and was promoted to major. He served as lieutenant colonel in the Defence Staff in 1971 and at the Ministry of Defence from 1972 to 1973. Welin served in Hälsinge Regiment in 1974, was promoted to colonel in 1975 and served at the Swedish Armed Forces Staff College the same year, and attended the Swedish National Defence College in 1976.

From 1 October 1977, Welin served as deputy commander of Värmland Regiment in Karlstad. Welin was appointed chief of staff of the Western Military District in Skövde from 1 April 1979 and was appointed senior colonel in the General Staff Corps. On 1 October 1980, he was appointed chief of staff of the Eastern Military District in Strängnäs and was appointed major general at the same time. In 1981, Welin attended a staff school in United States. On 1 April 1984, Welin assumed the position of head of the Swedish National Defence College.

On 1 July 1986, he succeeded major general Gustav Hägglund as Force Commander of the United Nations Disengagement Observer Force (UNDOF) on the Golan Heights in Israel, with headquarters in Damascus, Syria. He served in this position until September 1988. On 1 October 1988, Welin was promoted to lieutenant general and appointed Commanding General of the Southern Military District in Kristianstad. He served in this position until 1992 when he retired from active service. Welin was then head of the Office of the Minister of Defence in the Ministry of Defence from 1993 to 1994. As appointed by Minister of Defence Anders Björck, Welin did a solo investigation into where the UN school and a possible international disaster and aid center should be located; Karlsborg or Södertälje.

Welin took an active part in the defence debate with articles in the daily press and he was a commentator in Radio/TV between 1968 and 1973. Welin was also a board member of the Swedish Fencing Federation (Svenska Fäktförbundet) from 1974 to 1982 and chairman of the Sveagardesföreningen from 1993 to 2000 and in the association De Femton. Welin became a member of the Royal Swedish Academy of War Sciences in 1973 and served as chairman of Department I from 1996 to 2000 and was vice president from 2002 to 2006.

== Personal life ==
Welin got engage to Coco Selfelt in March 1954. The banns of marriage were issued on 10 October 1954 and on 5 November 1954 in Gustaf Adolf Church, Stockholm, Welin married Lillemor Gunvor Elisabet (Coco) Selfelt (1931–1997), the daughter of lieutenant colonel Robert Selfelt and Gunvor (née Lindeman). They had two children: Anders (born 31 May 1957 at Allmänna BB, Stockholm), and Elisabeth (born 14 May 1960 at Allmänna BB, Stockholm).

== Death ==
Welin, who suffered from COPD, died on 11 November 2008 in Engelbrekt Parish, Stockholm. The funeral took place in the Gustaf Adolf Church on 18 December 2008. He was interred on 15 June 2009 at Solna Cemetery.

== Dates of rank ==
- 1952 – Second lieutenant
- 19?? – Lieutenant
- 1964 – Captain
- 1968 – Major
- 1971 – Lieutenant colonel
- 1975 – Colonel
- 1 April 1979 – Senior colonel
- 1 October 1980 – Major general
- 1 October 1988 – Lieutenant general

== Awards and decorations ==
- (Sweden) Knight of the Order of the Sword (6 June 1970)
- United Nations Medal (UNFICYP) (1968)
- United Nations Medal (UNDOF) (1988)

== Honours ==
- Member of the Royal Swedish Academy of War Sciences (1973)

== Bibliography ==
- Huldt, Bo; Welin, Gustaf; Örn, Torsten, eds. (1995). Bevara eller skapa fred: FNs nya roll (in Swedish). Stockholm: Norstedt. ISBN 9119522622. SELIBR 7156839.
- Lehander, Bengt; Welin, Gustaf; Persson, Ragnar (1981). Försvarsmaktens avvägning (in Swedish). Linköping. SELIBR 639084.
- Welin, Gustaf; Bringmark, Gösta (1973). Några synpunkter på det militära försvarets roll i framtida svensk säkerhetspolitik: inträdesanförande i Kungl Krigsvetenskapsakademien 27 november 1973 (in Swedish). [Stockholm]. SELIBR 2055316.
- Welin, Gustaf; Ekelund, Christer O:son (1999). FN på Cypern: den svenska fredsbevarande insatsen 1964-1993 (in Swedish). Stockholm: Probus. ISBN 9187184613. SELIBR 7762944.
- Welin, Gustaf; Ekelund, Christer O:son; Von Horn, Johan (2004). The U.N. in Cyprus: the Swedish peace-keeping operations 1964-1993. London: Hurst & Company. ISBN 1850657416. SELIBR 9800747.

Military offices
Preceded by John Petersson	Värmland Brigade; 1978–1978	Succeeded by Krister Larsson
Preceded by Robert Lugn	Chief of Staff of the Western Military District; 1979–1980	Succeeded by Jan Enquist
Preceded by Erik G. Bengtsson	Chief of Staff of the Eastern Military District; 1980–1984	Succeeded by Roland Grahn
Preceded by Bengt Liljestrand	Swedish National Defence College; 1984–1987	Succeeded by Bror Stefenson
Preceded by Gustav Hägglund	United Nations Disengagement Observer Force (UNDOF); July 1986 – September 1988	Succeeded by Adolf Radauer
Preceded by Carl Björeman	Commanding General, Southern Military District; 1988–1992	Succeeded by Owe Wiktorin
