= Erik Rosengren =

Swedish Army officer (1908–1988)

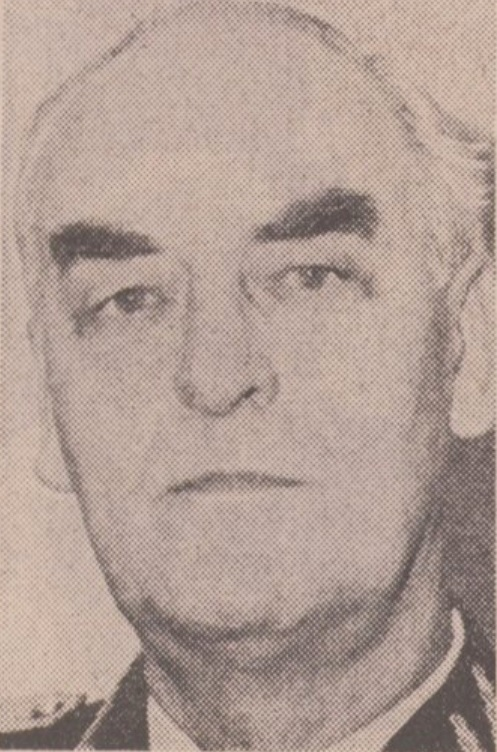
- Born: Erik Olof Rosengren; 1 February 1908; Kalmar, Sweden
- Died: 22 February 1988 (aged 80); Stockholm, Sweden
- Burial place: Galärvarvskyrkogården
- Military career
- Allegiance: Sweden
- Branch: Swedish Army
- Service years: 1929–1973
- Rank: Lieutenant General
- Commands: Älvsborg Regiment; Royal Army Staff College; Armed Forces Staff College
- Conflicts: Post-Suez Crisis

Lieutenant General Erik Olof Rosengren (1 February 1908 – 22 February 1988) was a Swedish Army officer. He served as head of the Royal Swedish Army Staff College from 1959 to 1961 and as head of the Swedish Armed Forces Staff College from 1961 to 1973.

== Early life ==
Rosengren was born on 1 February 1908 in Kalmar City Parish (Kalmar stadsförsamling), Kalmar, Sweden, the son of Elander Rosengren and his wife Ruth (née Österberg). He passed studentexamen in 1926.

== Career ==
Rosengren was commissioned as an officer in 1929 and was assigned as a second lieutenant in Jönköping-Kalmar Regiment (I 12). He was promoted to lieutenant in 1933 and attended the Royal Swedish Army Staff College from 1935 to 1937. Rosengren was an aspirant in the General Staff Corps from 1937 to 1939 and he became captain of the General Staff Corps in 1939. He served in the Army Staff from 1939 to 1942 and in the staff of the III Military District from 1942 to 1943. Rosengren served as a teacher at the Royal Swedish Army Staff College from 1943 to 1945 and he was appointed captain in the Life Regiment Grenadiers (I 3) in 1945. Rosengren was promoted to major in 1947 and he served in the Army Staff from 1947 to 1948 and in Svea Life Guards (I 1) in 1948.

He then served as a teacher at the Royal Swedish Army Staff College from 1948 to 1953, and he became lieutenant colonel of the General Staff Corps in 1951 and attended the Swedish National Defence College in 1951. He Rosengren was assigned to Gotland Infantry Regiment (I 18) 1953 and was promoted to colonel and appointed commander of Älvsborg Regiment (I 15) in 1956. From 1957 to 1958, Rosengren served as Chief of Staff and Deputy Commander of the United Nations Emergency Force (UNEF) in Gaza. In 1959, he was appointed head of the Royal Swedish Army Staff College. In 1961, Rosengren was appointed head of the newly created Swedish Armed Forces Staff College (MHS). Rosengren was also a pioneer in arranging as good a social situation as possible for teachers and students at the MHS. Through his energetic work, the housing foundation MHS-student could be formed. Rosengren was promoted to major general in 1965 and retired and was given a tombstone promotion to lieutenant general in 1973.

Rosengren was also a member of the Voluntary Committee (Frivilligkommittén), which he became in 1951. He was chairman of the Officers' Association (Officersföreningen) and the delegation for military history research from 1962 to 1973. He was also a board member of the Military Literature Association (Militärlitteraturföreningen) from 1947 and of Hörsta förlag AB from 1958 to 1961. He was also a member of the Swedish Order of Freemasons, Rotary International, Order of Hvita Korset, Brunkeberg, FBD, and the friendship associations of I 15, I 3, I 18. He was also involved in the MHS Association (Föreningen MHS). Rosengren was a contributor of Det andra världskrigets historia, wrote articles in the daily and trade press, and was a contributor of Radiotjänst between 1943 and 1954.

== Personal life ==
In 1940, Rosengren married Mai-Gret Legerth (born 1918), the daughter of Ragnar Jansson and Anne (née Du Rietz). They had one child: Annette (born 1946).

== Death ==
Rosengren died on 22 February 1988 in Oscar Parish, Stockholm. He was interred on 15 April 1988 at Galärvarvskyrkogården in Stockholm.

== Dates of rank ==
- 1929 – Second lieutenant
- 1933 – Lieutenant
- 1939 – Captain
- 1947 – Major
- 1951 – Lieutenant colonel
- 1956 – Colonel
- 1965 – Major general
- 1973 – Lieutenant general

== Awards and decorations ==
=== Swedish ===
- (Sweden) Grand Cross of the Order of the Sword (6 June 1972)
- (Sweden) Knight of the Order of Vasa
- (Sweden) Älvsborg Association for Volunteer Military Training's gold medal (Älvsborgs befäls(utbildnings)förbunds guldmedalj)
- (Sweden) Älvsborg Shooting Association's gold medal (Älvsborgs skytteförbunds guldmedalj)
- (Sweden) Army Shooting Medal (Arméns skyttemedalj)

=== Foreign ===
- (Norway) Commander of the Order of St. Olav (1 July 1960)
- United Nations Emergency Force Medal

== Honours ==
- Member of the Royal Swedish Academy of War Sciences (1951)
- Honorary member of the Royal Swedish Society of Naval Sciences (1970)

== Bibliography ==
- Rosengren, Erik, ed. (1948). I fält 1939-1945: närkingar och bergslagsfolk under beredskapen (in Swedish). [Örebro]: [s.n.] SELIBR 1408340.
- Seitz, Heribert; Rosengren, Erik (1944). Huvuddragen av Sveriges freder och fördrag 1524-1905: kortfattad sammanställning (in Swedish). Stockholm: Rabén & Sjögren. SELIBR 891765.

Military offices
Preceded by Gustav Åkerman	Älvsborg Regiment; 1956–1959	Succeeded by Bengt Uller
Preceded by Gunnar af Klintberg	Royal Swedish Army Staff College; 1959–1961	Succeeded by None
Preceded by None	Swedish Armed Forces Staff College; 1961–1973	Succeeded by Gustaf Peyron
