= Claës Skoglund =

Swedish major general

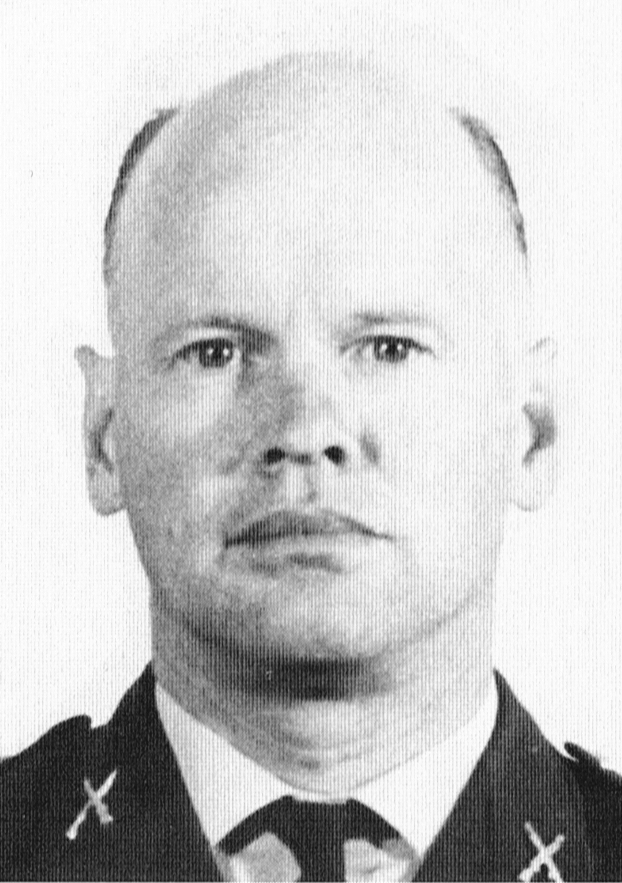
- Born: Claes (Claës) Gösta Skoglund; 28 February 1916; Borås, Sweden
- Died: 26 February 2008 (aged 91); Stockholm, Sweden
- Military career
- Allegiance: Sweden
- Branch: Swedish Army
- Service years: 1937–1978
- Rank: Major general
- Commands: Bohuslän Regiment; Chief of Staff, Milo V National Defence College; Western Military District

Major General Claes (Claës) Gösta Skoglund (28 February 1916 – 26 February 2008) was a Swedish Army officer. Skoglund's military journey began at the Military Academy Karlberg in Stockholm in 1937, leading to various command roles during World War II. His career saw him rise through the ranks, culminating in appointments such as Commanding General of the Western Military District. Skoglund's contributions extended beyond his military service; he played key roles in defense investigations and commissions, advised on operational integration, and engaged in international exchange programs. Notably, he was a member of Rotary International and contributed to military discourse through publications and committee memberships. Skoglund's legacy is characterized by his unwavering dedication to operational cooperation principles and his commitment to the development of the Swedish military, earning him accolades such as the Royal Swedish Academy of War Sciences' gold medal of merit in 2004.

== Early life ==
Skoglund was born on 28 February 1916 in Borås Parish in Älvsborg County, Sweden, the son of Captain Laur Skoglund and his wife Signe (née Odqvist).

== Career ==
=== Military career ===
Skoglund graduated from the Military Academy Karlberg in Stockholm in 1937 and was assigned as a second lieutenant to the Älvsborg Regiment in his hometown of Borås in 1937. During World War II, Skoglund served as army adjutant to the Commanding Admiral of the West Coast Naval District, Vice Admiral Harald Åkermark and to the Commendant of Älvsborg Fortress. He attended the Royal Swedish Army Staff College from 1944 to 1946, and was promoted to captain in 1945. Skoglund became captain in the General Staff Corps in 1948. He served as a teacher at the Royal Swedish Army Staff College from 1949 to 1951, and was posted to Älvsborg Regiment again in 1951, and returned to a teaching position at the Royal Swedish Army Staff College between 1953 and 1955. Skoglund became major in the General Staff Corps in 1954, lieutenant colonel in 1958, and was posted to Älvsborg Regiment in 1960. He attended the Swedish National Defence College from 1958 to 1960, and became colonel in the General Staff Corps in 1961.

Skoglund served as head of the Defence Staff's Operations Commander III from 1961 to 1963, and as commander of the Bohuslän Regiment in Uddevalla from 1963 to 1966. He then served as chief of staff in the Western Military District from 1966 to 1968. In the government council on 8 December 1967, Skoglund was appointed major general and head of Gotland Military Command from 1 October 1968. In the government council on 29 March 1968, Skoglund was instead appointed major general and head of the Swedish National Defence College in Stockholm from 1 October 1968. Skoglund was appointed Commanding General of the Western Military District in 1972, serving in this position until 1978. However, Skoglund was granted leave from 1 April 1974 to assist in the Ministry of Defence to prepare an investigation into the organization of the defence branch staffs. He served in the Ministry of Defence until 1977 and retired in 1978.

=== Other work ===
Skoglund was an expert in the 1945 Defence Investigation and subsequent activities in the Ministry of Defence and the Committee of Supply ahead of the Defence Act of 1948. Furthermore, he was an expert in the 1949 Defence Commission (1949 års försvarskommission), the 1955 Defence Preparation (1955 års försvarsberedning), and was secretary in the 1948 Command Investigation (1948 års befälsutredning). He underwent exchange service in the Swedish Air Force and completed operational courses at the Royal Air Force in the United Kingdom and the United States Army Air Defense School in the United States. Skoglund advised on the operational integration of the Swedish Armed Forces at the central level, conducted a feasibility study for the operational integration of the Armed Forces at a higher regional level, served as an expert in the Swedish Armed Forces Leadership Investigation 1974 (Försvarsmaktens ledningsutredning 1974, FLU 74) from 1974 to 1980, and investigated operational staff methodology and operational training for the Supreme Commander of the Swedish Armed Forces from 1980 to 1981.

Skoglund was a member of Rotary International. He was a contributor in Ny militär tidskrift from 1948 to 1960, in Svenska Dagbladet from 1949 to 1963, and was a member of the National Swedish Psychological Defence Planning Committee (Beredskapsnämnden för psykologiskt försvar) from 1972 to 1977.

== Legacy ==
In an obituary, Major General Erik Rossander described Claës Skoglund as a fervent supporter of the principles of operational cooperation, yet he remained a dedicated army officer with an unwavering commitment to the army's development. Rossander further wrote that "Skoglund debated, argued, and advocated for his beliefs, and numerous members of the Royal Swedish Academy of War Sciences have been called, written to, or approached at work to kindly but firmly clarify what should be said and done on various issues. He enthusiastically worked to make the army's brigades more effective and personally attended all brigade unit exercises to, as a sole judge, select the one to be awarded his personal prize for the best unit. Skoglund was very active in the Royal Swedish Academy of War Sciences for more than 50 years and he was a periodical chairman of Section I. In 2004, he was awarded the Academy's gold medal of merit as evidence of his tireless work for the Swedish military's best interests. Skoglund was an honest, talented, and stimulating officer. He could be perceived as assertive in debate, but he could also be thoughtful and he considered well-supported arguments. He probably thought things were better in the past, but he never ignored realities, and his proposals always aimed forward. He worked until the very end with his typewriter in his lap."

== Personal life ==
In 1954, Skoglund married Sigrid Östberg (1929–1980), the daughter of John Östberg and Elsa (née Nordén). They had three children: Maria (born 1957), Annsofi (born 1959), and Claes (born 1961).

== Death ==
Skoglund died on 26 February 2008 in Mary Magdalene Parish in Stockholm, Sweden. He is interred along with his wife at Djurö Cemetery in Värmdö Municipality.

== Dates of rank ==
- 1937 – Second lieutenant
- ? – Lieutenant
- 1945 – Captain
- 1954 – Major
- 1958 – Lieutenant colonel
- 1961 – Colonel
- 1 October 1968 – Major general

== Awards and decorations ==
=== Swedish ===
- (Sweden) Commander 1st Class of the Order of the Sword (6 June 1968)
- (Sweden) Knight of the Order of Vasa (1957)
- (Sweden) Royal Swedish Academy of War Sciences Medal of Reward in gold (Kungl. Krigsvetenskapsakademiens belöningsmedalj i guld)

=== Foreign ===
- Commander of the Order of the White Rose of Finland (December 1974)

== Honours ==
- Member of the Royal Swedish Academy of War Sciences (1955)

== Selected bibliography ==
- Skoglund, Claës (2009). Det bästa försvarsbeslut som aldrig kom till stånd: ett kontrafaktiskt uppslag (PDF). Publikation / Försvaret och det kalla kriget (FOKK), 1652–5388; 17 (in Swedish). Stockholm: Svenskt militärhistoriskt bibliotek. ISBN 9789185789573. SELIBR 11704940. Archived from the original (PDF) on 4 August 2018.
- Skoglund, Claës (1984). Tillkomsten år 1942 av ett ÖB-ämbete i fred (in Swedish). Stockholms universitet. Historiska institutionen. SELIBR 3401271.
- Skoglund, Claës (1983). Ett försök att skapa ett ÖB-ämbete 1930–1936 (in Swedish). Stockholms universitet. Historiska institutionen. SELIBR 3401264.

Military offices
Preceded by Gunnar Smedmark	Bohuslän Regiment; 1963–1966	Succeeded by Bertil Kamph
Preceded by Sture Fornwall	Chief of Staff, Western Military District; 1966–1968	Succeeded by Nils Sköld
Preceded by Malcolm Murray	Swedish National Defence College; 1968–1972	Succeeded by Bo Westin
Preceded by Henrik Lange	Commanding General, Western Military District; 1972–1978	Succeeded by Nils Personne
