= Sigmund Ahnfelt =

Swedish Army officer

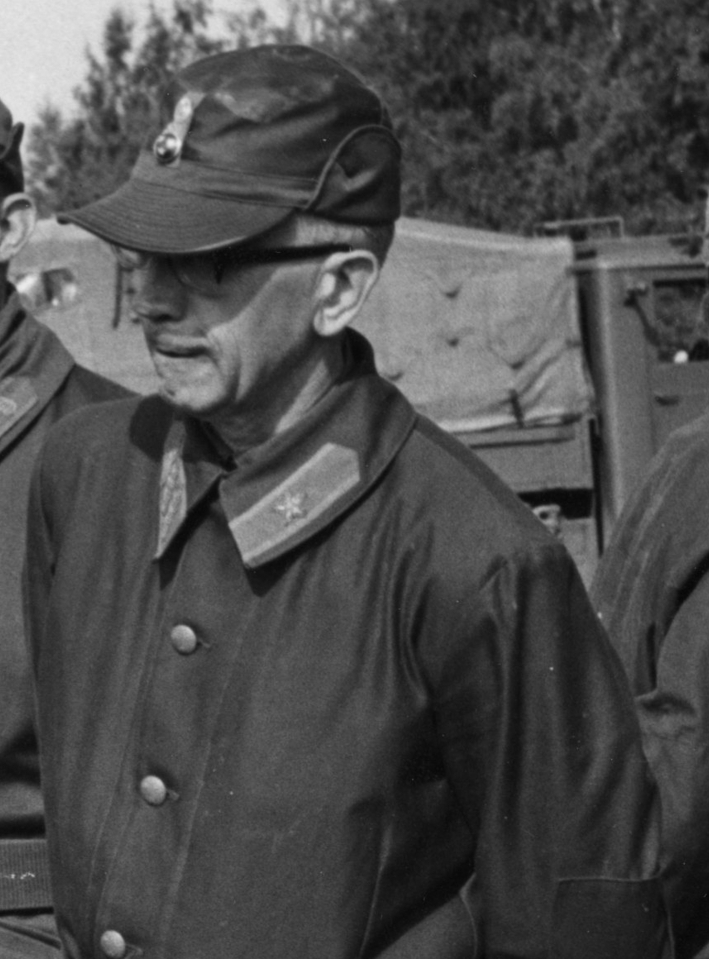
- Ahnfelt in 1968
- Born: 7 January 1912; Sollentuna, Sweden
- Died: 14 November 1993 (aged 77); Stockholm, Sweden
- Burial place: Solna Cemetery
- Military career
- Allegiance: Sweden
- Branch: Swedish Army
- Service years: 1938–1979
- Rank: Major general
- Commands: Älvsborg Regiment; CofS, Southern Military District; Bergslagen Military District
- Conflicts: Continuation War; Korean War

Major General Sigmund Ahnfelt (28 November 1915 – 14 November 1993) was a Swedish Army officer. Ahnfelt was commissioned as an officer in 1938 and served in the Finnish Army during World War II. He attended the United States Army Command and General Staff College from 1949 to 1950 and followed the operations of the UN troops in Korea during the Korean War in 1951. He eventually became commander of Älvsborg Regiment in Borås in the 1960s and then served as chief of staff and Deputy Commanding General of the Southern Military District. Ahnfelt served as Commanding General of the Bergslagen Military District until his retirement in 1979.

== Early life ==
Ahnfelt was born on 28 November 1915 in Sollentuna Parish, Sweden, the son of Edmund Ahnfelt, a factory manager, and his wife Signe (née Haase). Ahnfelt was the grandson of Arvid Ahnfelt and nephew of Astrid Ahnfelt.

After Ahnfelt passed studentexamen at Norra Latin in Stockholm in 1933, he completed university studies in history and political science before he began his military service in the Gotland Infantry Corps in Visby in 1934.

== Career ==
Ahnfelt was commissioned as an officer in 1938 and was assigned as a second lieutenant to the Jämtland Ranger Regiment in Östersund. He was appointed captain and company commander of the Finnish-Swedish regiment IR 13 in the Finnish Army in 1942 during the Continuation War in Finland. Ahnfelt was an adviser in the 1948 Conscription Committee and from 1949 to 1950, he studied at the United States Army Command and General Staff College at Fort Leavenworth, Kansas, United States, and then became the first Swedish national after World War II to have studied at a military college abroad.

Ahnfelt followed the operations of the UN troops in Korea during the Korean War in 1951 and served as a teacher in the Royal Swedish Army Staff College from 1952 to 1956 and attended the Swedish National Defence College in 1956. In 1956, the Chief of the Army, Lieutenant General Carl August Ehrensvärd appointed the then major Ahnfelt as commander of the Swedish UN battalion in the United Nations Emergency Force (UNEF). The Swedish government opposed the nomination because of Ahnfeldt's previous involvement in the Lindholm movement. Ahnfeldt had been Sven Olov Lindholm's closest man for six years and had at the age of 27 candidated for the National League of Sweden after Alf Meyerhöffer at the municipal elections in Östersund. Ehrensvärd threatened to resign unless he got his way, according to Prime Minister Tage Erlander. Ahnfeldt was persuaded, however, by defence minister Torsten Nilsson to resign from the post. He was replaced by Lieutenant Colonel Ingmar Stevenberg.

Ahnfelt then served as head of the Defence Staff's Army Department from 1957 to 1960, and became lieutenant colonel in the General Staff Corps in 1959. He was an adviser in the 1960 Defence Committee, head of Section I in the Defense Staff from 1960 to 1961, and served in Älvsborg Regiment in Borås in 1961. Ahnfelt was promoted to colonel in 1962 and was an adviser in the Supreme Commander of the Swedish Armed Forces's working group before the Defence Act of 1963. He then served as deputy commander of Älvsborg Regiment in 1962 and became its commander the year after. Ahnfelt was promoted to major general in 1966 and served as chief of staff and Deputy Commanding General of the Southern Military District in Kristianstad from 1966 to 1973. In 1973, he was appointed Commanding General of the Bergslagen Military District in Karlstad. He served in this position until 1979 when he retired from active service.

Ahnfelt was chairman of Älvsborg Voluntary Military Training Association (Älvsborgs befäls(utbildnings)förbund) and in the Älvsborg Rifle Association (Älvsborgs skytteförbund) from 1962. He authored (together with others) Både-Och (1957), Befälsföring, disciplin och förbandsanda (1957), and Officer 1938 (1983). He was a military contributor in Dagens Nyheter 1952–1954, Ny militär tidskrift ("New Military Journal") 1953–1961, Borås Tidning 1962–1966, SDS from 1968, and in Krigsvetenskapsakademiens Handlingar och Tidskrift from 1949. Ahnfelt also authored numerous articles in various military journals.

== Personal life ==
In 1958, Ahnfelt married Caroline Kempff (1929–2000), the daughter of lieutenant colonel Ragnar Kempff and Maria von Hedenberg.

== Death ==
Ahnfelt died on 14 November 1993 in Engelbrekt Parish, Stockholm. He was interred in the family grave at Solna Cemetery in Solna Municipality, near Stockholm.

== Dates of rank ==
=== Swedish Army ===
- 1938 – Second lieutenant
- 1940 – Lieutenant
- 1946 – Captain
- 1955 – Major
- 1959 – Lieutenant colonel
- 1962 – Colonel
- 1966 – Major general

=== Finnish Army ===
- 1942 – Captain

== Awards and decorations ==
=== Swedish ===
- (Sweden) Commander Grand Class of the Order of the Sword (6 June 1973)
- (Sweden) Commander 1st Class of the Order of the Sword (6 June 1969)
- (Sweden) Commander of the Order of the Sword (6 June 1966)
- (Sweden) Knight of the Order of the Sword (1956)
- (Sweden) Home Guard Medal of Merit in gold
- (Sweden) Swedish Civil Protection Association Merit Badge
- (Sweden) Swedish Reserve Officers Association's Honor Badge (Svenska reservofficersföreningens hederstecken, SvRoffHt)
- (Sweden) Army Shooting Medal in gold (Arméns skytteguldmedalj, SkytteGM)
- (Sweden) Swedish Army and Air Force Reserve Officers Association's "highest awards" (Svenska Arméns och Flygvapnets reservofficersförbund, SAFR) (November 1974)

=== Foreign ===
- (Finland) 4th Class of the Order of the Cross of Liberty with swords and oak leafs
- Finnish Commemorative Cross on the occasion of Finland's war 1939-45 (Finskt minneskors med anledning av Finlands krig 1939-45, FMk)
- (Finland) Finnish War Commemorative Medal (Finsk krigsminnesmedalj, FMM)

== Honours ==
- Member of the Royal Swedish Academy of War Sciences (1953)

Military offices
Preceded by Bengt Uller	Älvsborg Regiment; 1962–1966	Succeeded by Karl Gunnar Lundquist
Preceded by Kjell Nordström	Chief of Staff/Deputy Commanding General, Southern Military District; 1966–1973	Succeeded by Rolf Rheborg
Preceded by Stig Löfgren	Commanding General, Bergslagen Military District; 1973–1979	Succeeded by Gösta Hökmark
