= Bohuslän Regiment =

Coordinates: 58°20′52″N 11°57′26″E

- Bohusläns regemente
- Active: 1720–1992
- Country: Sweden
- Allegiance: Swedish Armed Forces
- Branch: Swedish Army
- Type: Infantry
- Size: Regiment
- Part of: 3rd Military District (1833–1893); 3rd Army Division (1893–1901); III Army Division (1902–1927); Western Army Division (1928–1936); III Army Division (1937–1943); III Military District (1943–1966); Western Military District (1966-1992)
- Garrison/HQ: Uddevalla
- Nickname: Green Dragoons (Gröna dragonerna)
- Mottos: Gärningar – Inte ord (Note: Later used by the 14th Home Guard Battalion.) ("Deeds - Not words"); Mod, tapperhet och uthållighet - en krigsmans förnämsta dygder ("Courage, bravery and perseverance - the greatest virtues of a warrior")
- Colors: Green
- March: "Bohusläns regementes marsch" (Bagge/Speich) "Deutschland auf der Wacht" (Franke) (Note: The march replaced "Bohusläns regementes marsch" (Bagge/Speich) in 1889 and was established by Army Order 33/1953.)
- Battle honours: Lund (1676); Landskrona (1677); Hälsingborg (1710); Gadebusch (1712); Svensksund (1790)

Insignia
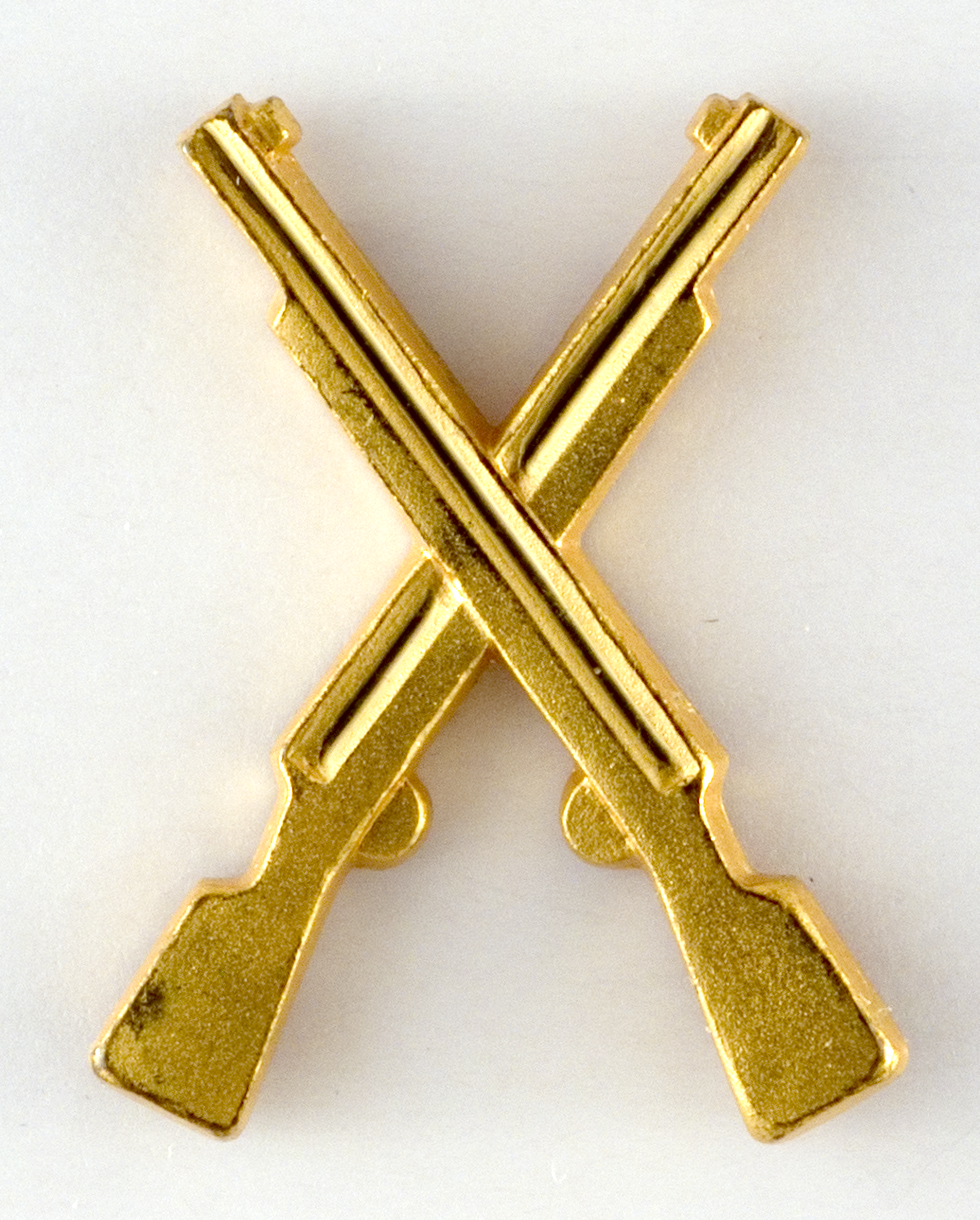
- Branch insignia m/60

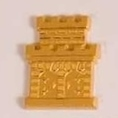
- Unit insignia m/60

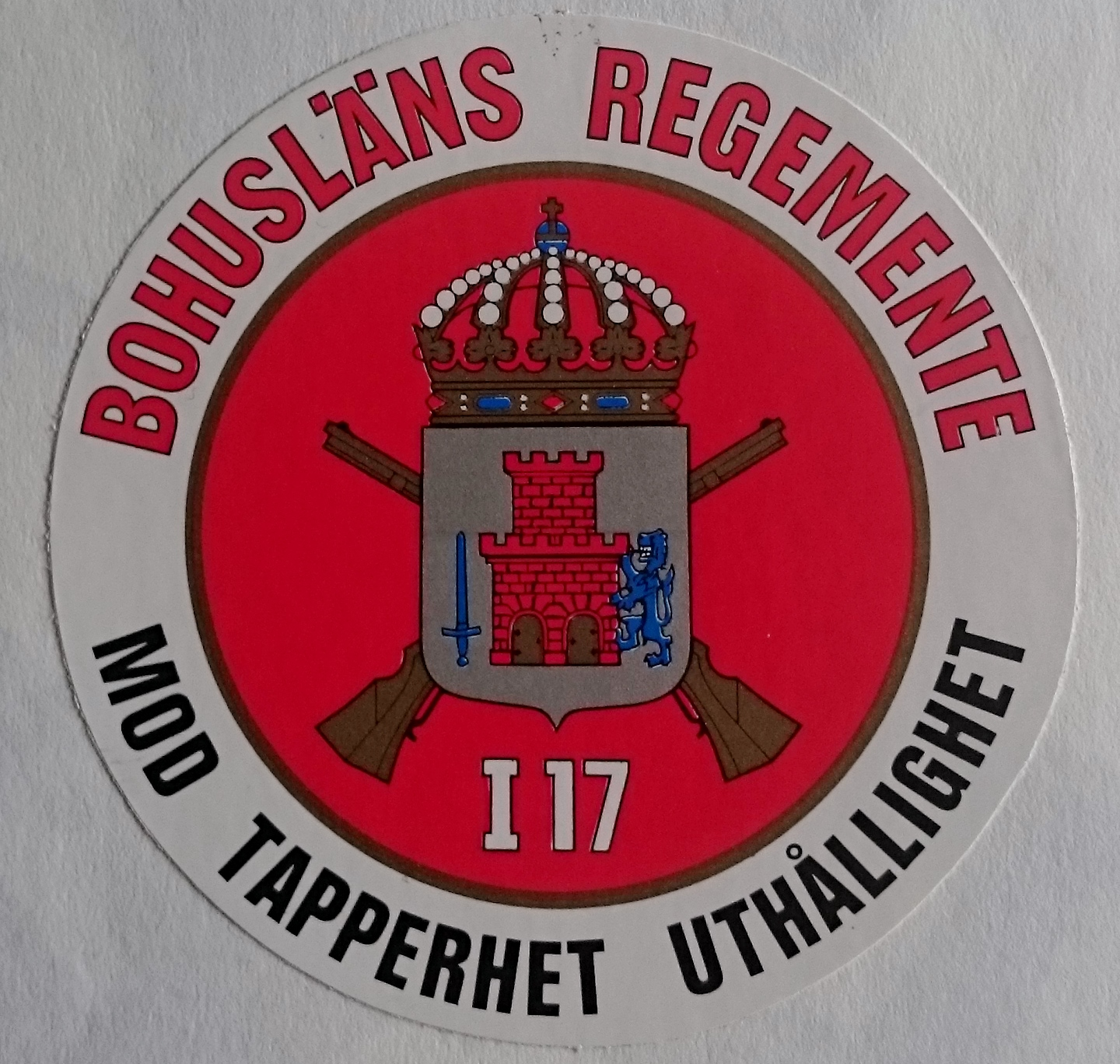
- Shoulder sleeve insignia

The Bohuslän Regiment (Swedish: Bohusläns regemente), designation I 17, was a Swedish Army infantry regiment that traces its origins back 1661. It was disbanded in 1992. The regiment's soldiers were originally recruited from the provinces of Bohuslän, and it was later garrisoned there in the town Uddevalla.

== Heraldry and traditions ==
=== Colours, standards and guidons ===
The colour was presented to the former Royal Bohuslän Regiment (I 17) in Uddevalla by King Gustaf VI Adolf on 27 August 1961. The colour was drawn by Brita Grep and embroidered by hand in insertion technique by the company Libraria. It was used as regimental colour by I 17 until 1 July 1992 and as a National Home Guard colour (Uddevalla Northern Home Guard District) 1992–1997. Blazon: "On white cloth the provincial badge of Bohuslän; a red tower em-battled with two yellow portcullis with black hinges and locks, between dexter an erect blue sword and sinister a yellow lion rampant. On a red border at the upper side of the colour, battle honours in white." Battle honours: Lund (1676), Landskrona (1677), Hälsingborg (1710), Gadebusch (1712) and Svensksund (1790).

=== Coat of arms ===
The coat of the arms of the Bohuslän Regiment (I 17) 1977–1992 and the Bohus-Dal Group (Bohus-Dalsgruppen) since 1997. Blazon: "Argent, the provincial badge of Bohuslän, a castle with a tower both embattled gules; masoned sable, two portcullis or charged with hinges and locks sable between a sword erect azure and a lion rampant of the last, armed and langued or. The shield surmounted two muskets in saltire or".

=== Memorial stones ===
In 1901, the regiment raised a memorial stone of the Battle of Svensksund at its former military camp, Backamo, in connection with a visit by the German regiment Graf Roon. This German regiment is derives from the former Psilanderhielmska Regiment based in Pomerania, which in 1796 became named after the newly arrived commander von Engelbrechten. When the regiment moved in to Uddevalla, the monument was moved to the adjacent regiment park at the present Bohuslän Defense Museum.

=== Heritage ===
In connection with the decommissioning of Bohuslän Regiment, its traditions came from 1 July 1992 onwards to be kept by the Bohus Group (Bohusgruppen).

== Commanding officers ==
Regimental commanders:

=== Commanders ===
- 1720–1728: Ture Gabriel Bielke
- 1720–1721: Jean Louis Bousquet (acting)
- 1722–1724: Johan Fredrik Didron (acting)
- 1728–1740: Axel Erik Roos
- 1740–1746: Anders Tungelfeldt
- 1746–1758: Georg Reinhold von Köhler
- 1759–1763: Lars Åkerhielm
- 1763–1769: Georg Gustaf Wrangel
- 1769–1775: Mauritz Casimir Lewenhaupt
- 1775–1781: Axel Didrik Meijendorff von Yxkull
- 1781–1790: Jan Verner Tranefelt
- 1789–1792: Hans Henric von Essen (acting)
- 1790–1792: Gustav Wachtmeister
- 1792–1793: Fredrik Adolf von Numers
- 1793–1796: Adolf Fredrik Påhlman
- 1796–1810: Johan Leonard Belfrage
- 1810–1821: Erik Wilhelm Haij
- 1818–1821: Philip von Mecklenburg (acting)
- 1821–1838: Philip von Mecklenburg
- 1838–1856: Georg Gillis von Heideman
- 1856–1868: Henrik Nauckhoff
- 1868–1881: Georg Fleetwood
- 1881–1882: Otto Taube
- 1881–1882: Axel Rappe (acting)
- 1882–1885: Axel Rappe
- 1885–1890: Axel Rudenschöld
- 1890–1892: Christer Oxehufvud
- 1890–1892: Mathias Fjellman (acting)
- 1892–1898: Mathias Fjellman
- 1898–1907: Olof Malm
- 1907–1915: Charles Tottie
- 1914–1915: Olof Melin (acting)
- 1915–1921: Olof Melin
- 1921–1923: Bengt Ribbing
- 1923–1930: Victor Landegren
- 1930–1936: Harald Malmberg
- 1936–1937: Thorsten Rudenschiöld (acting)
- 1937–1942: Thorsten Rudenschiöld
- 1942–1948: Sven Öberg
- 1948–1957: Erik Sellin
- 1957–1963: Gunnar Smedmark
- 1963–1966: Claës Skoglund
- 1966–1971: Bertil Kamph
- 1971–1977: Gunnar Åberg
- 1977–1980: Åke von Schéele
- 1980–1982: Lars Löfberg
- 1982–1983: Arne Rolff (acting)
- 1983–1985: Arne Rolff
- 1985–1987: Jan-Olof Borgén
- 1987–1990: Kaj Sjösten
- 1990–1990: Lennart Bergqvist
- 1991–1992: Lars Andréasson

=== Deputy commanders ===
- 1969–19??: Lieutenant colonel Arne Rolff
- 1982–1983: Colonel Arne Rolff

== Names, designations and locations ==
Name	Translation	From		To
Kungl Bohusläns kavalleri- och dragonregemente	Royal Bohuslän Cavalry and Dragoon Regiment	1720-12-21	–	1727-??-??
Kungl Bohusläns dragonregemente	Royal Bohuslän Dragoon Regiment	1727-??-??	–	1776-??-??
Kungl Bohusläns lätta dragonregemente	Royal Bohuslän Light Dragoon Regiment	1776-??-??	–	1791-??-??
Kungl Bohusläns regemente	Royal Bohuslän Regiment	1791-??-??	–	1974-12-31
Bohusläns regemente	Bohuslän Regiment	1975-01-01	–	1992-06-30
Designation		From		To
No. 17		1816-10-01	–	1914-09-30
I 17		1914-10-01	–	1992-06-30
Location		From		To
Backamo		1770-??-??	–	1913-09-27
Uddevalla		1913-10-14	–	1992-06-30

== See also ==
- List of Swedish infantry regiments
