= Carl Björeman =

Swedish Army officer (1924–2020)

- Born: Karl Erik Björeman; 8 June 1924; Östra Ryd, Sweden
- Died: 10 September 2020 (aged 96); Djursholm, Sweden
- Burial place: Galärvarvskyrkogården
- Military career
- Allegiance: Sweden
- Branch: Swedish Army
- Service years: 1949–1988
- Rank: Lieutenant General
- Commands: Östersund Defence District; Jämtland Brigade; Operations Command 1, Fst; Chief of Staff, Milo S; Southern Military District

Lieutenant General Karl (Carl) Erik Björeman (8 June 1924 – 10 September 2020) was a senior Swedish Army officer. Björeman served as Chief of Staff of the Southern Military District (1980–1984), and as Commanding General of the Southern Military District (1984–1988).

== Early life ==
Björeman was born on 8 June 1924 on the farm Kinäs in Östra Ryd Parish, Östergötland County, Sweden, the son of Wiktor Johansson, a farmer, and his wife Anna (née Nilsson). He had two brothers and was the oldest in a group of 22 cousins who all came from Höstbäck farm in Åtvidaberg. One of his cousins was Carl G. Nilsson, a member of parliament for Östergötland County. Björeman worked at home on the farm at a young age, but already at the age of 17 applied to become a volunteer at the Life Grenadier Regiment in Linköping in the autumn of 1941. He passed studentexamen in 1948.

== Career ==
Björeman attended the Swedish Infantry Officer Candidate School from 1944 to 1945 and the Swedish Armed Forces School for Secondary Education in Uppsala from 1945 to 1948. From 1948 to 1949, he served as an officer candidate in Jämtland Ranger Regiment. In 1949, Björeman graduated from the Military Academy Karlberg and was commissioned as an officer with the rank of second lieutenant and assigned to Uppland Regiment, where in 1951 he was promoted to lieutenant. In 1957 he left Uppland Regiment to serve as an observer in Korea for a few months. He studied from 1957 to 1959 at the Royal Swedish Army Staff College, was promoted to captain in 1959 and served as deputy company commander in Jämtland Ranger Regiment from 1959 to 1960. He then served as an aspirant in the General Staff Corps between 1960 and 1962 and between 1961 and 1964 in Operation Management III in the Defence Staff. Björeman served as a teacher in the Army Program at the Swedish Armed Forces Staff College from 1964 to 1966 and was company commander in Norrbotten Regiment in 1966.

After being promoted to major in 1966, he was head of department in the staff of Eastern Military District from 1966 to 1968. In 1968 he was promoted to lieutenant colonel and he served from 1968 to 1971 at the Operations Command 2 in the Defence Staff, after which he was posted as battalion commander in Hälsinge Regiment from 1971 to 1973. In 1973, Björeman studied at Swedish National Defence College. On 1 April 1974, he was colonel and appointed commander of Östersund Defence District (Östersunds försvarsområde). Björeman then served as brigade commander of Jämtland Brigade (Jämtlandsbrigaden) in Jämtland Ranger Regiment from 1974 to 1976. He was promoted to senior colonel in 1976 and was from 1976 to 1980 head of Operations Command 1 and 2 in the Defence Staff. On 14–27 October 1977, he accompanied General Stig Synnergren on a visit to China to study China's defence in Beijing and in several provinces. At the beginning of December 1977, senior colonel Björeman was both the oldest and the fastest when commanders and conscripts from units, staffs and schools in Stockholm completed a military test of a 30 kilometer loaded march with 18 kilos Stäket-Rosersberg round trip. In groups, the 73 participants went on forest roads and carried out a live fire exercise with the Carl Gustaf m/45 submachine gun and Automatkarbin 4 battle rifle. Björeman got full score and reached the finish line in less than seven hours.

In 1980, Björeman was promoted to major general and then served as Chief of Staff in the Southern Military District from 1980 to 1984, after which he was promoted to lieutenant general on 1 October 1984 and was appointed Commanding General, Southern Military District. He retired from active service in 1988 and transferred to the reserve.

Björeman was for a long time a diligent debater on defence issues. He was active as a writer in Vårt försvar from 1964 to 1980, in Dagens Nyheter from 1979 to 1988 and in Kristianstadsbladet from 1991 to 2003. He wrote eight books, including his memoirs Soldat och general under kalla kriget ("Soldier and general during the Cold War") (2005).

== Personal life ==
In 1949, Björeman married Gunvor Carlsson (1920–2007), the daughter of Per Carlsson and Emy (née Nordberg). He had three daughters.

He was chairman of Fältjägarnas kamratförening in Stockholm, chairman of the orienteering club Pan-Önos and a member of Björsäters hembygdsförening.

== Death ==
Björeman died on 10 September 2020 in Djursholm. He was interred at Galärvarvskyrkogården in Stockholm on 21 October 2020.

== Dates of rank ==
- 1949 – Second lieutenant
- 1951 – Lieutenant
- 1959 – Captain
- 1966 – Major
- 1968 – Lieutenant colonel
- 1 April 1974 – Colonel
- 1976 – Senior colonel
- 1980 – Major general
- 1 October 1984 – Lieutenant general

== Awards and decorations ==
- (Sweden) Knight of the Order of the Sword (6 June 1967)
- (Sweden) Royal Swedish Academy of War Sciences' Medal of Reward in gold, 15th size (12 November 2012)

== Honours ==
- Member of the Royal Swedish Academy of War Sciences (1969)

== Bibliography ==
- Björeman, Carl (1983). Säkerhetspolitisk vardag och militärt försvar. Försvar i nutid, 0046-4643; 1983:6 (in Swedish). Stockholm: Centralförb. Folk och försvar. SELIBR 409165.
- Björeman, Carl (1989). Landet under missilbanorna (in Swedish). Stockholm: Timbro. ISBN 9175661772. SELIBR 7648233.
- Beijer, Carl-Fredrik; Björeman, Carl (1991). Det försvarspolitiska vägvalet: handlingsfrihet och nytänkande inför FB 92 (in Swedish). Stockholm: Militärhistoriska förl. ISBN 9185266515. SELIBR 7747358.
- Björeman, Carl (2005). Soldat och general under kalla kriget: vi hade en gång en försvarsmakt (in Swedish). Hallstavik: Svenskt militärhistoriskt bibliotek. ISBN 9197531553. SELIBR 10034902.
- Björeman, Carl (2009). År av uppgång, år av nedgång: försvarets ödesväg under beredskapsåren och det kalla kriget. Publikation / Försvaret och det kalla kriget (FOKK), 1652-5388; 20 (in Swedish). Stockholm: Svenskt militärhistoriskt bibliotek. ISBN 9789185789580. SELIBR 11647610.
- Björeman, Carl (2011). Försvarets förfall: konsten att lägga ned försvaret utan att någon bryr sig. Försvaret och det kalla kriget (FOKK), 1652-5388; 29 (in Swedish). Stockholm: Santérus. ISBN 9789173590488. SELIBR 12300190.
- Björeman, Carl (2013). Var vi redo?: svenska armén under kalla kriget. Publikation / Försvaret och det kalla kriget (FOKK), 1652-5388; 43 (in Swedish). Stockholm: Svenskt militärhistoriskt bibliotek. ISBN 9789186837549. SELIBR 14935484.
- Björeman, Carl (2017). Sex överbefälhavare söker en roll: tvekampen mellan det territoriella och det teknologiska försvaret under det kalla kriget. Publikation / Försvaret och det kalla kriget (FOKK), 1652-5388; 53 (in Swedish). Stockholm: Forskningsprojektet Försvaret och det kalla kriget (FoKK). ISBN 9789198049831. SELIBR 22451794.

Military offices
Preceded by Bror Stefenson	Chief of Staff, Southern Military District; 1980–1984	Succeeded by Göran Wallén
Preceded by Bengt Schuback	Commanding General, Southern Military District; 1984–1988	Succeeded by Gustaf Welin
