= Älvsborg Regiment =

Coordinates: 57°42′46″N 12°55′00″E

- Älvsborgs regemente
- Active: 1624–1713; 1714–1998
- Country: Sweden
- Allegiance: Swedish Armed Forces
- Branch: Swedish Army
- Type: Infantry
- Size: Regiment
- Part of: 3rd Military District (1833–1893); 3rd Army Division (1893–1901); III Army Division (1902–1927); Western Army Division (1928–1936); III Army Division (1937–1943); III Military District (1943–1966); Western Military District (1966-1992); Southern Military District (1993-1998)
- Garrison/HQ: Borås
- Motto(s): Vilja - Förmåga - Uthållighet (Note: The motto was established on 20 March 1981. Later used by the Elfsborg Group (Elfsborgsgruppen) and the garrison units at the Swedish Armed Forces Centre for Defence Medicine as well as the 44th Home Guard Battalion.) ("Will - Ability - Endurance")
- Colors: Yellow and black
- March: "Lübner Jäger" (Müller) (Note: The march was adopted circa 1875 and established in 1953 by Army Order 33/1953. The march was used by the Älvsborg Brigade (Älvsborgsbrigaden) from 1994 to 1997 and by the Älvsborgs Group (Älvsborgsgruppen) from 1998 to 2005.)
- Battle honours: Varberg (1565); Lützen (1632); Leipzig (1642); Helsingborg (1710); Gadebusch (1712); Nya Älvsborg (1719)

Insignia
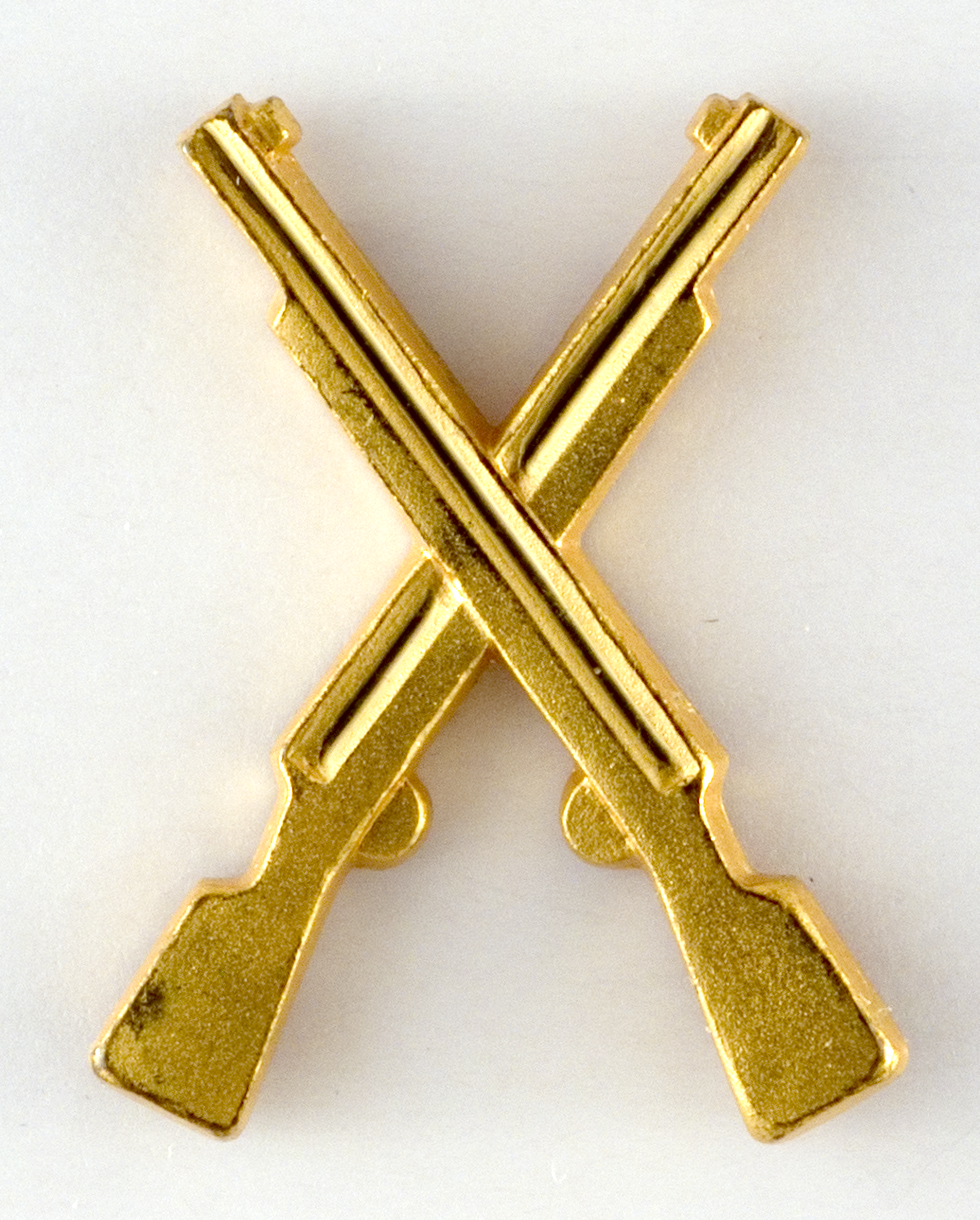
- Branch insignia m/60

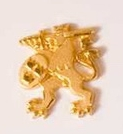
- Unit insignia m/60

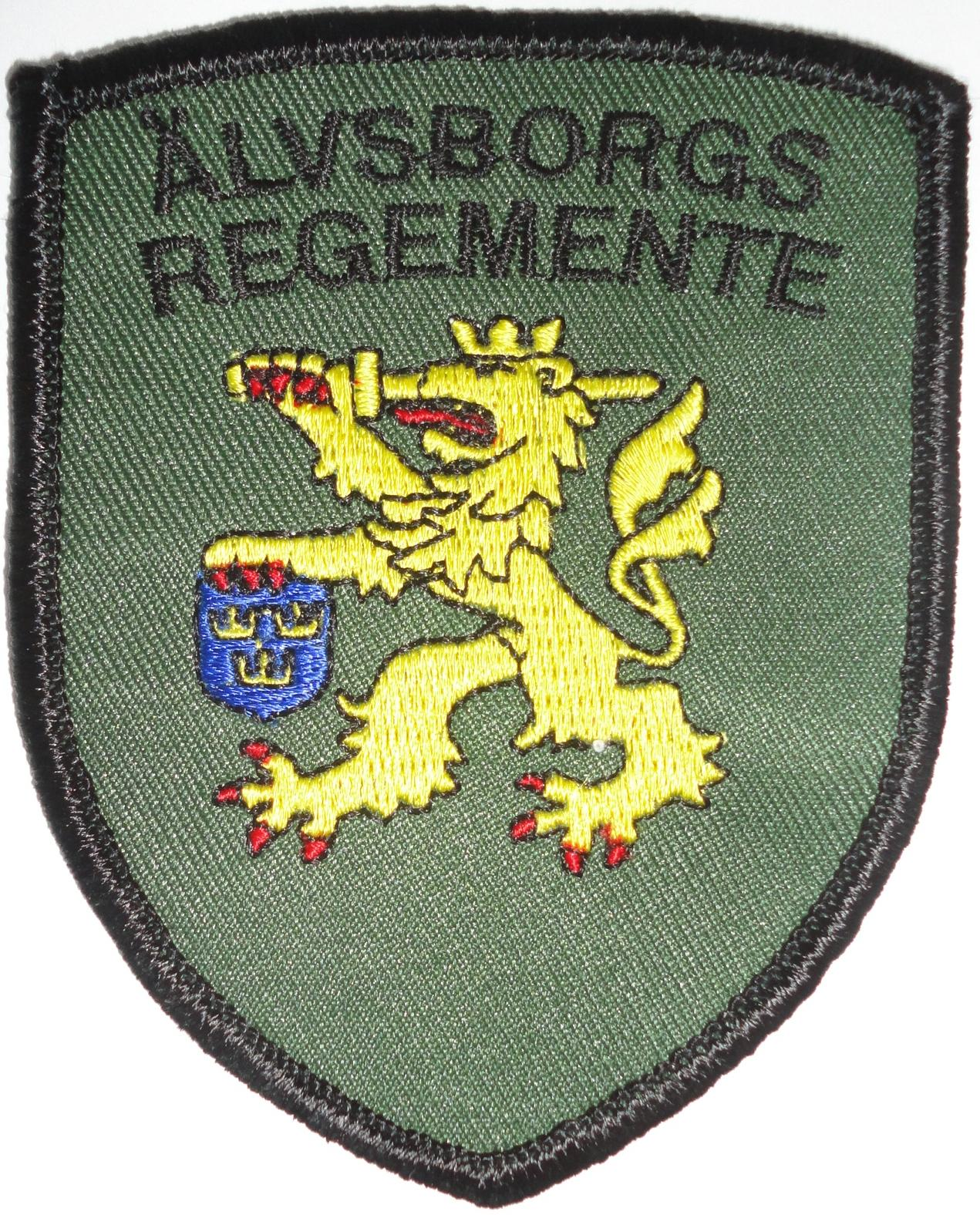
- Shoulder sleeve insignia

The Älvsborg Regiment (Swedish: Älvsborgs regemente), designation I 15 and I 15/Fo 34, was a Swedish Army infantry regiment that traces its origins back 1624. It was disbanded in 1998. The regiment's soldiers were originally recruited from the provinces of Västergötland, and it was later garrisoned there in the town Borås.

== Heraldry and traditions ==
=== Colours, standards and guidons ===
The regiment has carried a number of colours over the years. On 24 June 1854, the then crown prince, later King Charles XV presented the last battalion colours to the regiment. They were so called Oscar I type, and were presented at a summit on Axevalla heath. In 1904 the regiment adopted the 1st battalion's colour as regimental colour (which has been hanging in Älvsborgsmässen ("Älvsborg Mess") at Gothenburg Garrison since 1998).

Its last colour was presented to the former Älvsborg Regiment (I 15/Fo 34) at the Artillery Yard in Stockholm by the Supreme Commander, general Owe Wiktorin in 1996. It was used as regimental colour by I 15/Fo 34 until 1 July 1998. The colour was drawn by Ingrid Lamby and embroidered by machine in insertion technique by Maj Britt Salander/company Blå Kusten. Blazon: "The cloth divided six times in yellow and black, in the centre a circular shield with the badge of the regiment; azure, three wavy white bends sinister, charged with a yellow lion rampant with a royal crown proper, armed and langued gules, in the right forepaw a yellow sword and in the left a blue shield with three yellow crowns placed two and one. On the uppermost yellow length, battle honours (Lützen 1632, Leipzig 1642, Helsingborg 1710, Gadebusch 1712, Nya Älvsborg 1719) in black".

After the regiment was disbanded, the colour was passed on to the Älvsborg Group (Älvsborgsgruppen). Since 1 July 2005, the colour is carried by Elfsborg Group (Elfsborgsgruppen). The Elfsborg Group is also the unit that keeps the regimental traditions. The pattern of the colour has basically been unchanged since the 1600s.

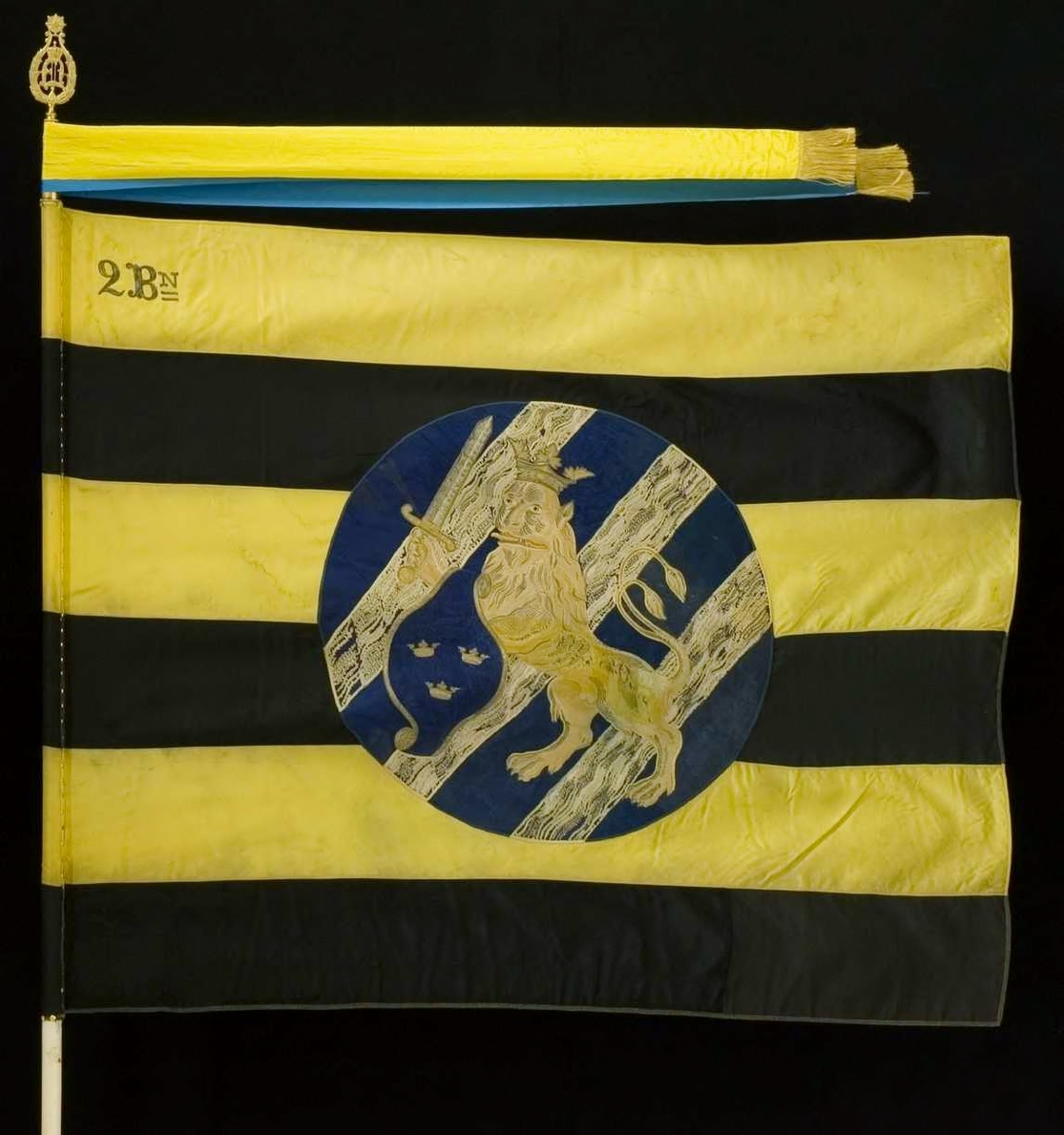
Battalion colour m/1849, for Älvsborg Regiment's 2nd battalion.

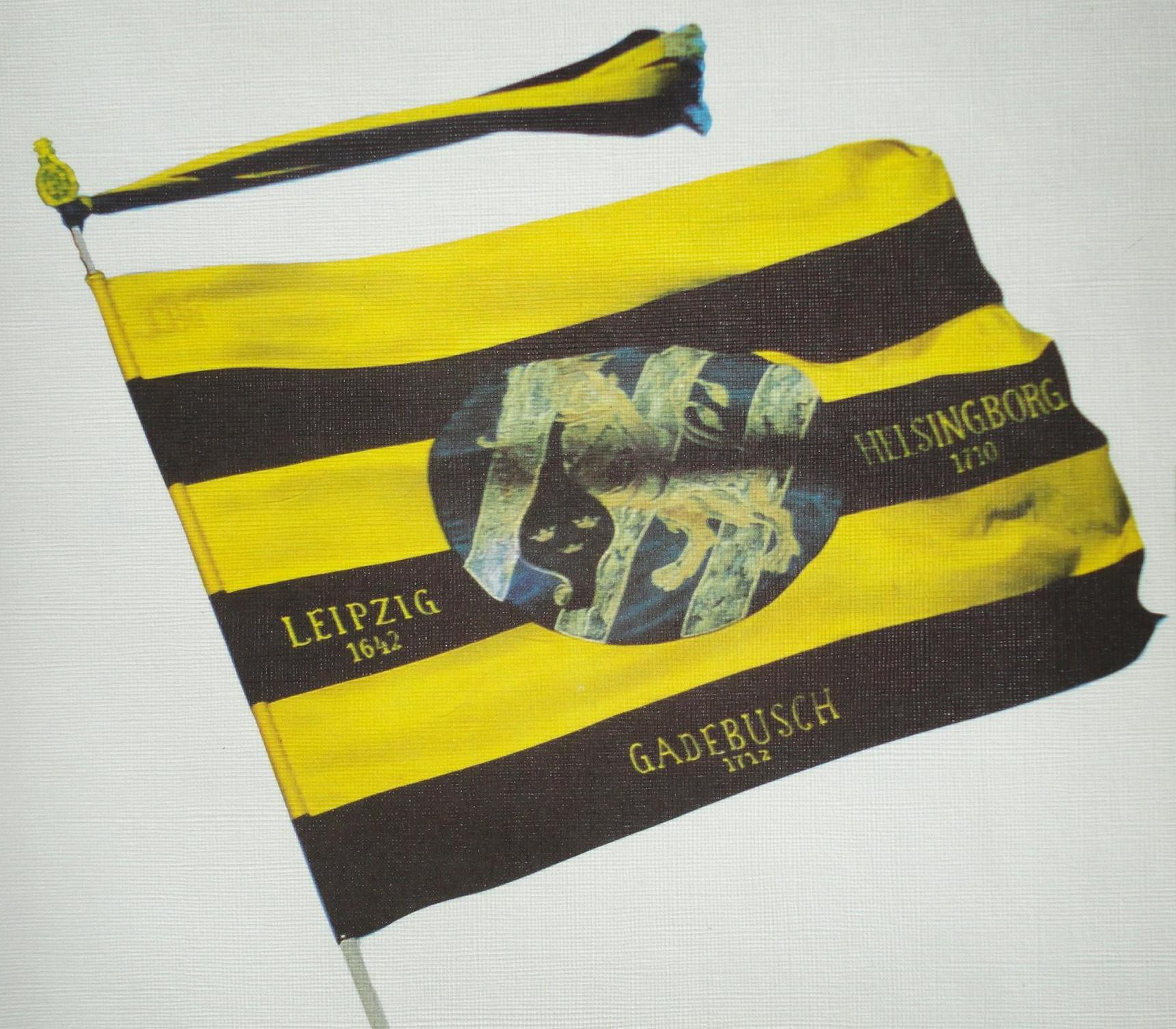
Älvsborg Regiment's 1st battalion colour from 1858.

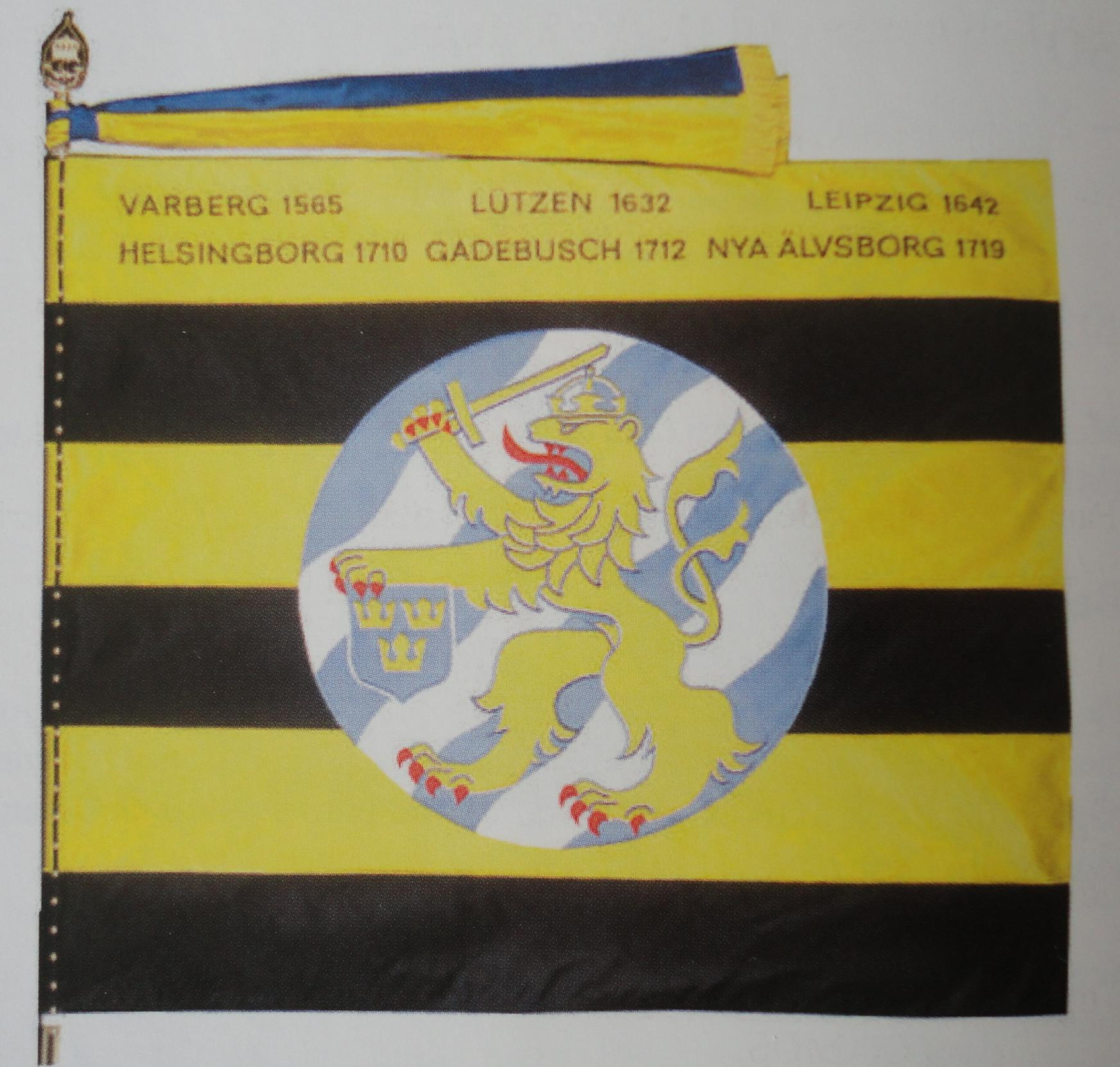
1996 regimental colour

=== Coat of arms ===
The coat of the arms of the Älvsborg Regiment (I 15/Fo 34) 1977–1994 and the Älvsborg Brigade (Älvsborgsbrigaden, IB 15) 1994–1997. Blazon: "The regimental badge, with waves six times divided bendy-sinister azure and argent, a double-tailed crowned lion rampant or, armed and langued gules, in dexter forepaw a sword or and in sinister a shield azure charged with three open crowns or placed two and one. The shield surmounted two muskets in saltire, or". The coat of arms of the Älvsborg Regiment (I 15/Fo 34) 1994–1997 and the Älvsborg Group (Älvsborgsgruppen) 1997–2004. Blazon: "Azur, the regimental badge, three waves bendy-sinister argent, a double-tailed crowned lion rampant or, armed and langued gules, in dexter forepaw a sword or and in sinister a shield azure charged with three open crowns or, placed two and one. The shield sur-mounted two swords in saltire, or."

Coat of arms of the Älvsborg Regiment (I 15/Fo 34) 1977–1994 and the Älvsborg Brigade (Älvsborgsbrigaden, IB 15) 1994–1997.

Coat of the arms of the Älvsborg Regiment (I 15/Fo 34) 1994–1997 and the Älvsborg Group (Älvsborgsgruppen) 1997–2004.

=== Medals ===
In 1999, when the regiment was disbanded, the Älvsborgs regementes (I 15) minnesmedalj ("Älvsborg Regiment (I 15) Commemorative Medal") in silver (ÄlvsbregMM) was established. It consist of a Maltese cross in blue enamel. The medal ribbon is of red moiré with two blue stripes on the middle.

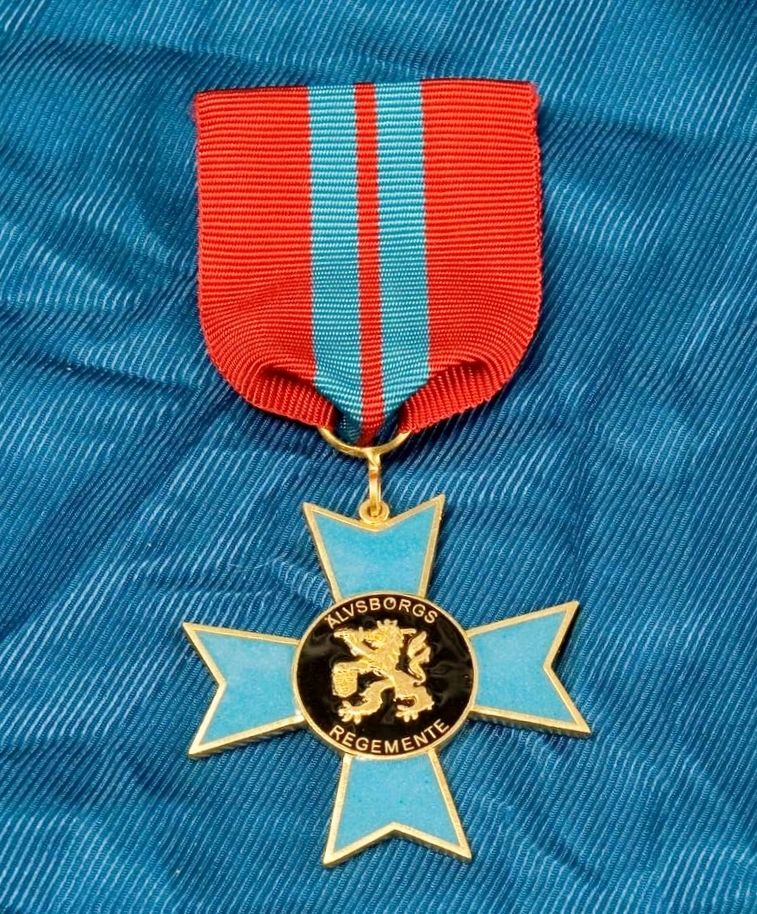
Älvsborg Regiment (I 15) Commemorative Medal

== Commanding officers ==
Regimental commanders active at the regiment the years 1624–1998.

=== Commanders ===
- 1624–16??: N Ribbing
- 1698–1710: A Sparrfelt
- 1710–1728: J von Mentzer
- 1728–1739: J A Lillie
- 1739–1747: Carl Otto Lagercrantz
- 1747–1751: J L von Saltza
- 1751–1763: R J von Lingen
- 1763–1766: Fredrik Ribbing
- 1766–1769: Johan Cronhielm
- 1769–1781: B P von Wufrath
- 1781–1800: H W Hamilton
- 1800–1805: E Edenhielm
- 1805–1810: Eberhard von Vegesack
- 1810–1817: C Reuterskiöld
- 1817–1869: J von Utfall
- 1869–1886: P H Melin
- 1886–1892: A A Thorén
- 1892–1894: Christer Gustaf Oxehufvud
- 1894–1898: L J P Liljencrantz
- 1898–1903: Carl Axel Leonard Nordenadler
- 1903–1906: Oscar Silverstolpe
- 1906–1913: Gustaf Henrik Sjöqvist
- 1913–1916: Adolf Erik Ludvig Lagercrantz
- 1916–1920: Ernst Lars Isaac Silfverswärd
- 1920–1927: Karl Alfred Rignell
- 1927–1936: Axel Gustaf von Arbin
- 1936–1938: Arvid Moberg
- 1938–1942: Anders Teodor Bergquist
- 1942–1951: Gunnar Fredrik Brinck
- 1951–1956: Colonel Gustav Åkerman
- 1956–1959: Colonel Erik Rosengren
- 1959–1962: Bengt Uller
- 1962–1966: Sigmund Ahnfelt
- 1966–1975: Karl Gunnar Lundquist
- 1975–1981: Senior colonel Åke Ingmar Lundberg
- 1981–1986: Sven Henry Magnusson
- 1986–1989: Per Blomqvist
- 1989–1992: Svante Bergh
- 1992–1998: Matts Uno Liljegren
- 1998–1998: Nils Erling Krister Edvardsson

=== Deputy commanders ===
- 1979–1981: Colonel Ingmar Arnhall

== Names, designations and locations ==
Name	Translation	From		To
Kungl. Älvsborgs regemente	Royal Älvsborg Regiment	1624–03–10	–	1713-05-06
Kungl. Älvsborgs regemente	Royal Älvsborg Regiment	1714-??-??	–	1974-12-31
Älvsborgs regemente	Älvsborg Regiment	1975-01-01	–	1998-06-30
Designation		From		To
No. 15		1816-10-01	–	1914-09-30
I 15		1914-10-01	–	1975-06-30
I 15/Fo 34		1975-01-01	–	1998-06-30
Location		From		To
Timmele Heath		1685-??-??	–	1770-??-??
Kila Heath		1770-??-??	–	1783-??-??
Örby Heath		1783-??-??	–	1796-??-??
Fristad hed		1797-??-??	–	1914-??-??
Borås Garrison		1914-??-??	–	1998-06-30

== See also ==
- List of Swedish infantry regiments
