= Bengt Schuback =

Swedish Navy officer

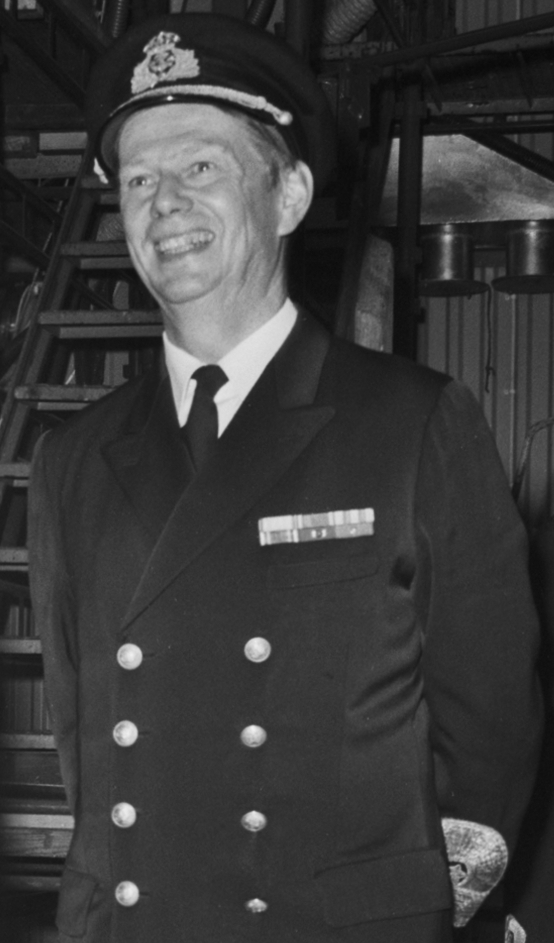
- Schuback in 1985
- Born: Bengt Jacob Schuback; 15 May 1928; Stockholm, Sweden
- Died: 4 December 2015 (aged 87); Uppsala, Sweden
- Military career
- Allegiance: Sweden
- Branch: Swedish Navy
- Service years: 1950–1990
- Rank: Vice Admiral
- Commands: Vice Chief of the Defence Staff; Chief of the Defence Staff; Southern Military District; Chief of the Navy
- Conflicts: Soviet submarine U 137

Vice Admiral Bengt Jacob Schuback (15 May 1928 – 4 December 2015) was a Swedish Navy officer. He was Chief of the Defence Staff from 1978 to 1982 during which time the Soviet submarine U 137 ran aground in Swedish waters. Schuback was later the commanding officer of the Southern Military District from 1982 to 1984 and the Chief of the Navy from 1984 to 1990.

== Early life ==
Schuback was born on 15 May 1928 in Stockholm, Sweden, the son of head of department Erik Schuback and his wife Elsa (née Lundén). He passed studentexamen in Uppsala in 1947 and became an aspirant at the Royal Swedish Naval Academy the same year. He finished first in his class and was commissioned as a naval officer in 1950 with the rank of acting sub-lieutenant.

== Career ==
Schuback attended the Royal Swedish Army Staff College from 1958 to 1960 and the Royal Swedish Naval Staff College from 1960 to 1961. He attended the Royal College of Defence Studies in London in 1975 and completed Swedish National Defence College's management course in 1976. Schuback was promoted to captain and seagoing unit commander in 1974 and to rear admiral and chief of staff of the Upper Norrland Military District (Milo ÖN) in 1976. He was Vice Chief of the Defence Staff in 1977 and was promoted to vice admiral and Chief of the Defence Staff in 1978. During the many Swedish submarine incidents in the 1960s and 1970s, the media had started talking about "budget submarines". When Schuback, as Chief of the Defence Staff, was reached by the news that the Soviet submarine U137 ran aground in Blekinge archipelago in 1981, he spontaneously exclaimed "Finally!". The discussion about "budget submarines" has fallen silent.

Schuback in his role as chief of the Defence Staff, had to recreate the Swedish anti-submarine warfare capabilities. New equipment and tactical instructions for the new units were developed under severe time pressure, a strong media pressure and with limited financial resources. Schuback was appointed military commander of the Southern Military District (Milo S) in 1982 and Chief of the Navy in 1984. He retired and left his post in 1990. After retirement, he devoted much of his time to the Foundation Ymer 80, which supports the Swedish polar research. Schuback was also chairman of the association Friends of the Vasa Museum (Föreningen Vasamuseets vänner) and was involved in the creation of the Stockholm Water Prize.

== Personal life ==
In 1952 he married Ann-Mari Hagström (born 1928), the daughter of Folke Hagström and Ingeborg (née Boström). He had three children; Anders, Peter and Katarina.

== Death ==
Schuback died on 4 December 2015 in Uppsala. The funeral service was held on 30 December 2015 in Holy Trinity Church in Uppsala.

== Dates of rank ==
Schuback's ranks

- 1950 – Acting sub-lieutenant
- 1952 – Sub-lieutenant
- 1962 – Lieutenant
- 1966 – Lieutenant commander
- 1968 – Commander
- 1973 – Captain
- 1976 – Rear admiral
- 1978 – Vice admiral

== Awards and decorations ==
- (Sweden) Knight 1st Class of the Order of the Sword (6 June 1968)
- (Norway) Commander with Star of the Royal Norwegian Order of Merit (5 August 1988)

== Honours ==
- Member of the Royal Swedish Academy of War Sciences (1973)
- Member of the Royal Swedish Society of Naval Sciences (1967; number 903)
- Honorary member of the Royal Swedish Society of Naval Sciences
- Inspector emeriti of the naval academic association SjöLund

== Bibliography ==
- Dingertz, Stig; Schuback, Bengt; Thörnsten, Sture, eds. (1998). H M Kryssare Fylgias sista långresa 1947-48 (in Swedish). Stockholm: Fören. aspirantdivisionen Fylgia 1947-48. ISBN 91-630-6470-7. SELIBR 7744523.
- Schuback, Bengt (1989). Framtidens sjöförsvar mellan hot och ekonomi (in Swedish). Stockholm: Kungl. Orlogsmannasällskapet. SELIBR 825748.

Military offices
Preceded by Karl-Gösta Lundmark	Chief of Staff of the Upper Norrland Military District; 1976–1977	Succeeded by Erik Nygren
Preceded by Sven-Olof Olson	Vice Chief of the Defence Staff; 1977–1978	Succeeded by Bengt Lehander
Preceded by Lennart Ljung	Chief of the Defence Staff; 1978–1982	Succeeded by Bror Stefenson
Preceded by Sven-Olof Olson	Southern Military District; 1982–1984	Succeeded by Carl Björeman
Preceded by Per Rudberg	Chief of the Navy; 1984–1990	Succeeded by Dick Börjesson
