= Stig Löfgren =

Swedish Army officer

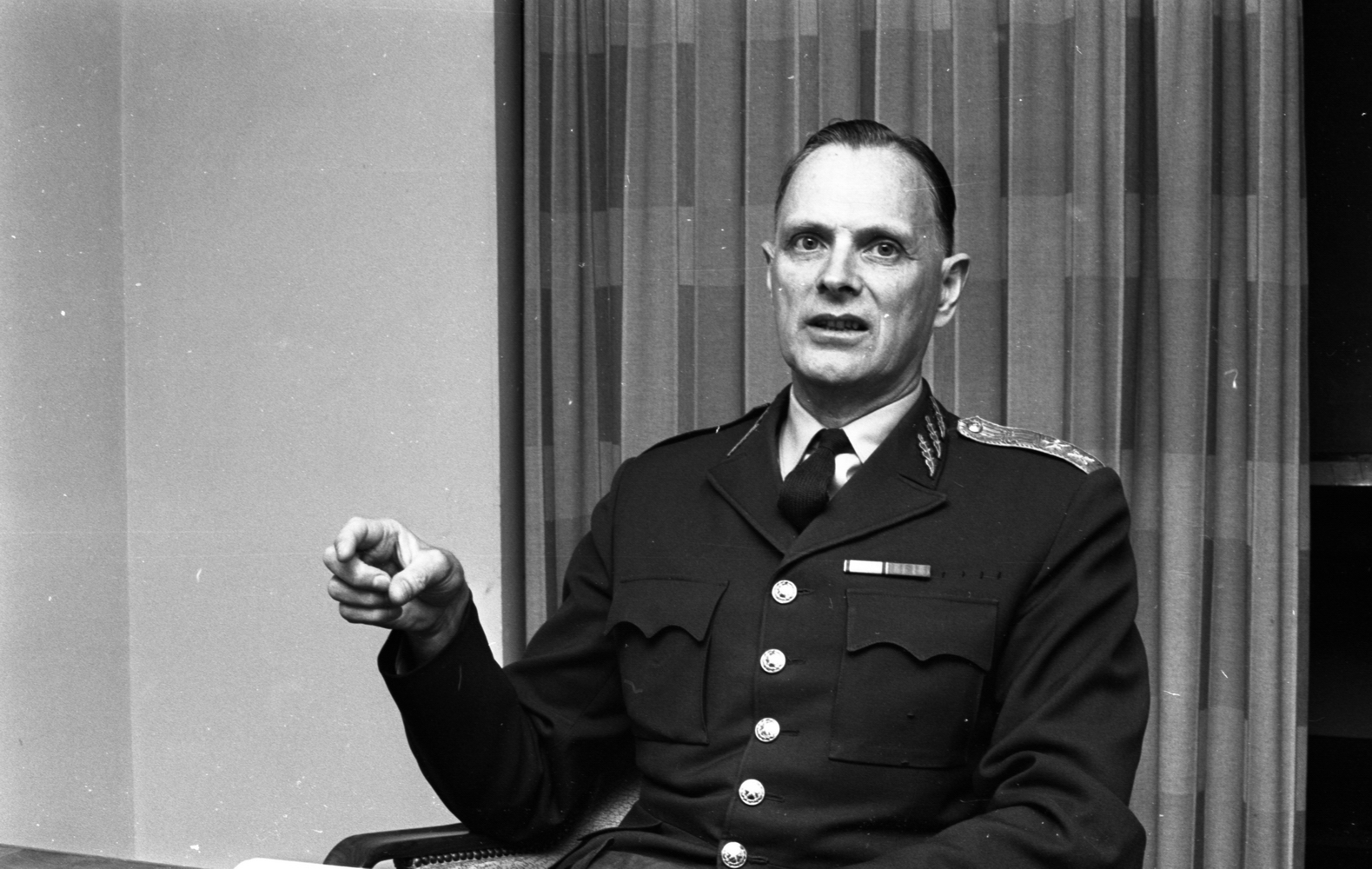
- Löfgren in 1967.
- Born: Stig Albert Lorentz Löfgren; 7 January 1912; Ljusnarsberg, Sweden
- Died: 28 April 1998 (aged 86); Täby, Sweden
- Military career
- Allegiance: Sweden
- Branch: Swedish Army
- Service years: 1933–1973
- Rank: Lieutenant General
- Commands: Wendes Artillery Regiment; Bergslagen Military District

Lieutenant General Stig Albert Lorentz Löfgren (7 January 1912 – 28 April 1998) was a Swedish Army officer. He served as Deputy Commanding General of the I Military District (1963–1966) and as Commanding General of Bergslagen Military District (1967–1973).

== Early life ==
Löfgren was born on 7 January 1912 in Ljusnarsberg, Örebro County, Sweden, the son of Alf Löfgren and his wife Asta (née Källgren).

== Career ==
Löfgren was commissioned as an officer in 1933 with the rank of second lieutenant. He was promoted to lieutenant in 1933 and to captain in 1941. Löfgren attended the Royal Swedish Army Staff College in 1942 and served in the Defence Staff in 1944. In the Army Department, he then came to work close to the Chief of the Defence Staff, major general Carl August Ehrensvärd. During this time Löfgren also served as an expert in the 1945 Defence Committee, where he made an effort which made Ehrensvärd in his memoirs to call Löfgren as one of the "best of the young General Staff Corps officers".

He was also a member in the Scandinavian defense negotiations from 1948 to 1949. In 1949 he was transferred to Boden Artillery Regiment, where he was appointed major, and in 1953 he returned to the Defence Staff. There Löfgren headed the Foreign Department from 1953 to 1956, and was promoted to lieutenant colonel in 1955. Löfgren served as military attaché in Washington, D.C. and Ottawa from 1956 to 1961 and was promoted to colonel in 1959. He was then commander of Wendes Artillery Regiment from 1961 to 1963. In 1963, he was a member of the Swedish delegation to the Eighteen Nation Committee on Disarmament in Geneva with Alva Myrdal. Returning home from Geneva he took over as deputy commander of the I Military District in Kristianstad. In 1966, Löfgren was promoted to major general and from 1967 to 1973 he served as Commanding General of Bergslagen Military District. He was promoted to lieutenant general on the retired list in 1973.

Löfgren co-wrote För Nordens frihet ("For the freedom of the Nordic countries") together with Malcolm Murray in 1949. Löfgren made an early entry into the Brunkeberg Club (Klubben Brunkeberg) and enriched the meetings with a number of lectures in an international security policy perspective. He made his biggest publicist contribution as a long-term employee of Svenska Dagbladet. He was involved in the newspaper as early as 1945, when his boss Ehrensvärd was one of the heavyweights. He was a military expert in the editorial department and was a member of the newspaper's board between 1968 and 1982.

== Personal life ==
In 1936, Löfgren married Gunvor Laurén (born 1910), the daughter of Torsten Laurén and Gerda (née Nilsson). They had three daughters: Christina, Agneta and Birgitta.

== Death ==
Löfgren died on 28 April 1998. He was interred on 5 June 1998 at the northern cemetery in Täby.

== Dates of rank ==
- 1933 – Second lieutenant
- 1937 – Lieutenant
- 1941 – Captain
- 1951 – Major
- 1955 – Lieutenant colonel
- 1959 – Colonel
- 1966 – Major general
- 1973 – Lieutenant general

== Awards and decorations ==
- (Sweden) Commander 1st Class of the Order of the Sword (6 June 1966)
- (Sweden) Commander of the Order of the Sword
- (Sweden) Knight of the Order of the Sword (1953)
- (Sweden) Knight of the Order of Vasa (1948)

== Honours ==
- Member of the Royal Swedish Academy of War Sciences (1951)

== Bibliography ==
- Murray, Malcolm; Löfgren, Stig (1949). För Nordens frihet: synpunkter på ett tidsenligt försvar (in Swedish). Stockholm. SELIBR 247129.
- Murray, Malcolm; Löfgren, Stig (1949). För Nordens frihet: Synpunkter på ett tidsenligt försvar. Skrifter / Militärlitteraturföreningens förlag, 99-0578882-4; 197 (in Swedish). Stockholm: Fören. [Norstedt]. SELIBR 1419927.

Military offices
Preceded by Nils Söderberg	Wendes Artillery Regiment; 1961–1963	Succeeded by Stig Magneberg
Preceded by Miles Flach	Deputy Commanding General, I Military District; 1963–1966	Succeeded by Sigmund Ahnfelt
Preceded by Stig Synnergren	Commanding General, Bergslagen Military District; 1967–1973	Succeeded by Sigmund Ahnfelt
