= Sven Colliander =

Swedish officer and equestrian

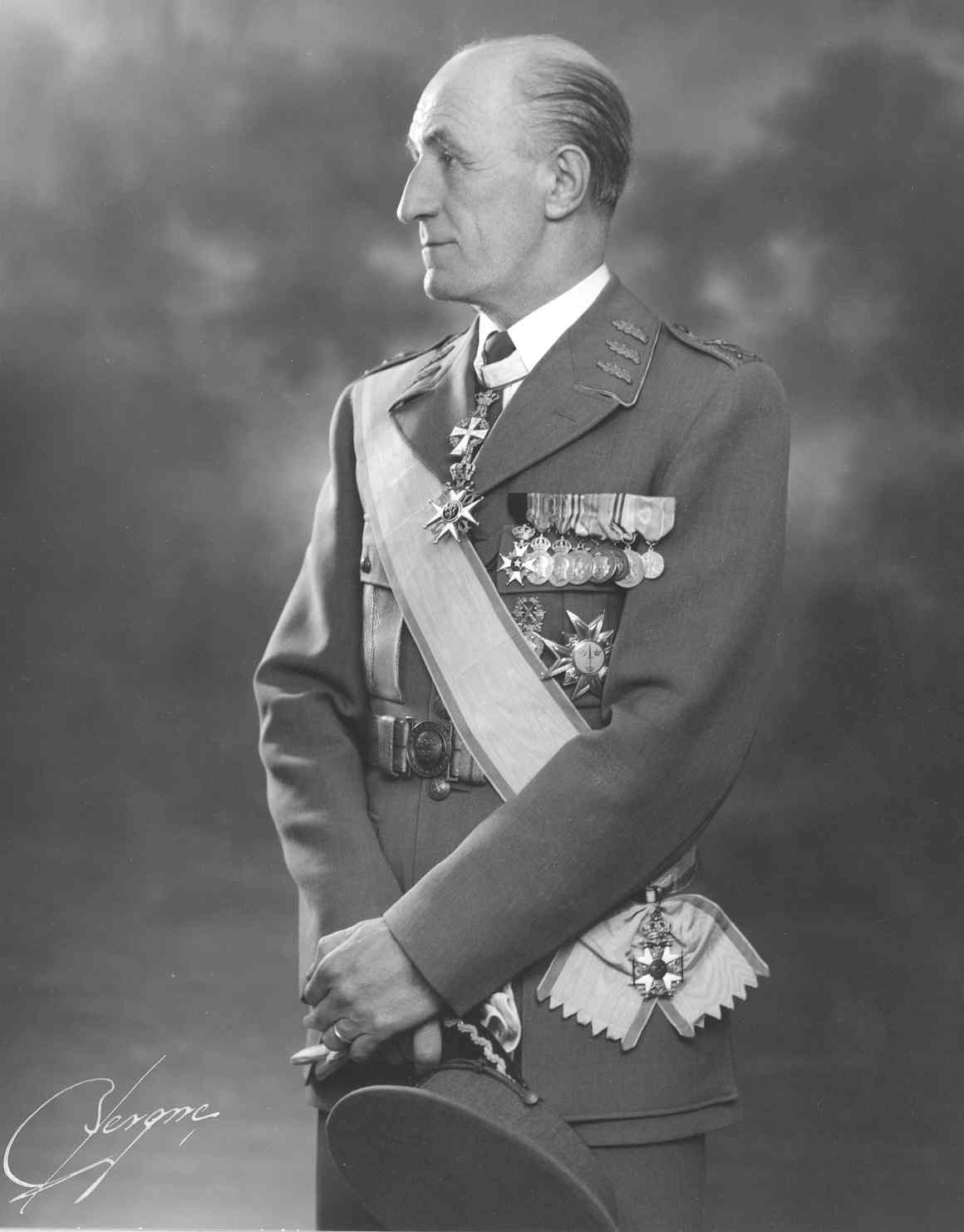
- Born: Sven August Wilhelm Colliander; 23 May 1890; Halmstad, Sweden
- Died: 16 September 1961 (aged 71); Täby, Sweden
- Military career
- Branch: Swedish Army
- Service years: 1910–1955
- Rank: Lieutenant General
- Commands: Riding School; Norrland Dragoon Regiment; VI Military District; III Military District
- Sports career
Medal record
Representing Sweden
Olympic Games
Bronze medal – third place	1936 Berlin	Team dressage

Lieutenant General Sven August Wilhelm Colliander (23 May 1890 – 16 September 1961) was a Swedish Army officer and horse rider who competed in the 1928 and 1936 Summer Olympics.

== Early life ==
Colliander was born on 23 May 1890 in Halmstad, Sweden, the son of C Alb Colliander and his wife Nathalia Noreen.

== Career ==
=== Military career ===
Colliander was commissioned as an officer in the Scanian Hussar Regiment (K 5) with the rank of underlöjtnant in 1910. He was promoted to captain in 1925 and served as a general staff officer from 1925 to 1928, and was promoted to major in 1933. Colliander served as commanding officer of the Swedish Army Riding School from 1934 to 1940 and he was promoted to lieutenant colonel in 1937. He was then promoted to colonel and appointed commanding officer of the Norrland Dragoon Regiment (K 4) in 1940. Three years later Colliander was appointed acting military commander of the I Military District, and in 1946 he was promoted to major general and appointed military commander of the VI Military District. Colliander served in this position for five years and in 1951 he was appointed military commander of the III Military District. In 1955 he was promoted to lieutenant general and retired from active service.

=== Sports career ===
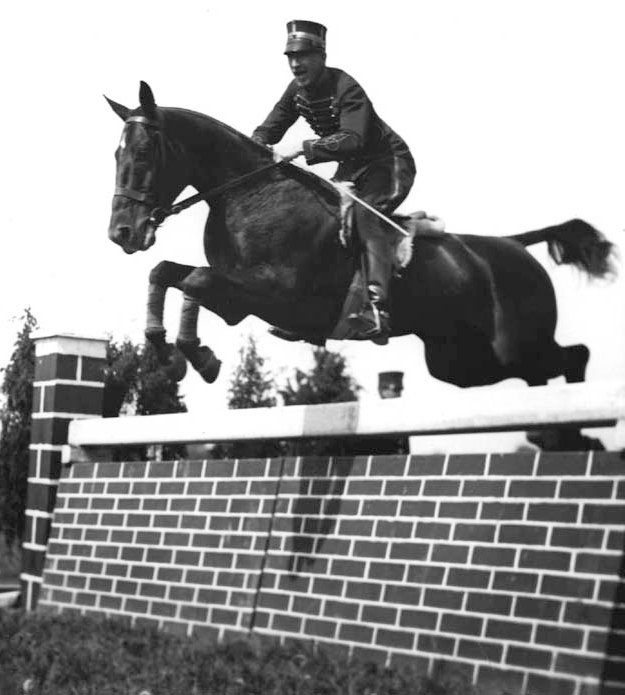
Sven Colliander in 1930

In 1928 he finished 13th in the individual eventing on the horse King, and his eventing team was unplaced. Eight years later he and his horse Kål XX were part of the Swedish dressage team that won the bronze medal, after finishing eleventh in the individual competition.

== Personal life ==
In 1914, he married Carin Wernersson (born 1893), the daughter of Wilhelm Wernersson and Anna Törnquist.

== Dates of rank ==
- 1910 – Underlöjtnant
- 19?? – Lieutenant
- 1925 – Captain
- 1933 – Major
- 1937 – Lieutenant colonel
- 1940 – Colonel
- 1946 – Major general
- 1955 – Lieutenant general
