= Western Military District (Sweden) =

Former military unit

- Västra militärområdet
- Active: 1942–1993
- Country: Sweden
- Allegiance: Swedish Armed Forces
- Branch: Multi (Sea, Air and Land)
- Type: Military district
- Role: Operational, territorial and tactical operations
- Garrison/HQ: Skövde garrison

Insignia
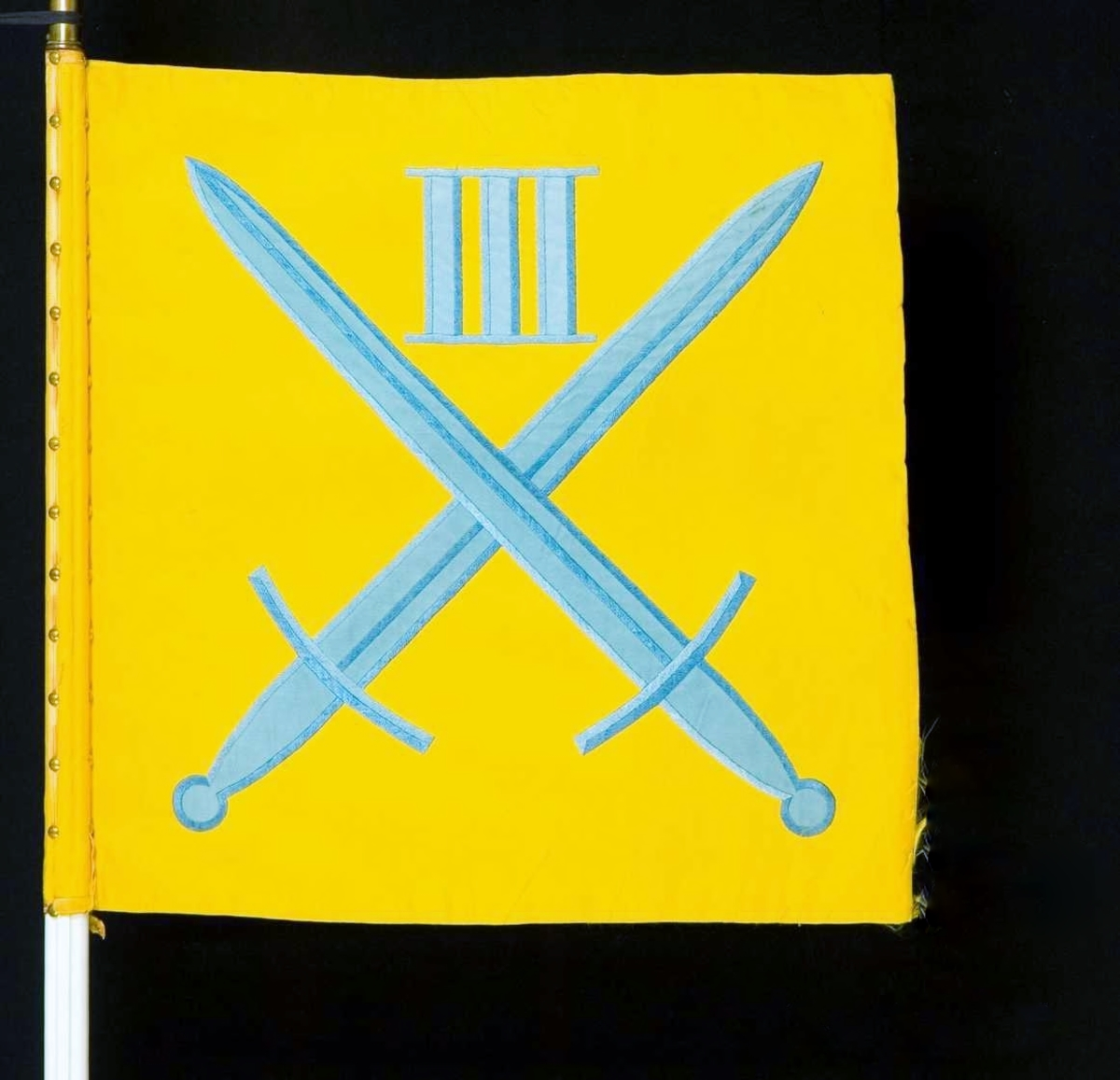
- Command flag

Western Military District (Swedish: Västra militärområdet, Milo V), originally III Military District (Swedish: III. militärområdet) was a Swedish military district, a command of the Swedish Armed Forces that had operational control over Western Sweden, for most time of its existence corresponding to the area covered by the counties of Gothenburg and Bohus, Älvsborg, Skaraborg (all three now joined as Västra Götaland County) and Halland. The headquarters of Milo V were located in Skövde.

== History ==
Milo V was created in 1966 along with five other military districts as part of a reorganisation of the administrative divisions of the Swedish Armed Forces. It can be seen as the successor of III Military District (III. militärområdet) created in 1942, but that did not have the same tasks as Milo V. The military district consisted of the land covered by the above-mentioned counties. In 1993, the number of military districts of Sweden was decreased to three, and as a consequence of that, Milo V was merged into the Southern Military District (Milo S).

== Units 1989 ==
In peacetime the Western Military District consisted of the following units, which were training recruits for wartime units:

- Western Military District (Milo V), in Skövde
  - Army units:
    - K 3 - Life Regiment Hussars, in Karlsborg
      - Göta Signal Battalion
      - Parachute Jäger Training Battalion
      - Swedish Army Paratroop School
      - Army Intelligence School
      - Armed Forces Survival School
    - P 4/Fo 35 - Skaraborg Regiment / Skaraborg Defense District, in Skövde
    - I 15/Fo 34 - Älvsborg Regiment / Älvsborg Defense District, in Borås
    - I 16/Fo 31 - Halland Regiment / Halland Defense District, in Halmstad
    - I 17 - Bohuslän Regiment, in Uddevalla
    - Lv 6 - Göta Air Defence Regiment, in Gothenburg
    - T 2 - Göta Logistic Regiment, in Skövde
  - Air Force units:
    - E 1 - Attack Command, in Gothenburg, also controls F 15 - Hälsinge Wing of Milo NN
      - F 6 - Västgöta Wing, in Karlsborg
        - 61st Attack Squadron, with AJ 37 Viggen attack aircraft
        - 62nd Attack Squadron, with AJ 37 Viggen attack aircraft
      - F 7 - Skaraborg Wing, in Lidköping
        - 71st Attack Squadron, with AJ 37 Viggen attack aircraft
        - 72nd Attack Squadron, with AJ 37 Viggen attack aircraft
        - 71st Transport Squadron, with 8x C-130H Hercules and 4x Super King Air 200
    - F 14 - Halmstad Air Force Schools, in Halmstad
      - Air Force Officer College
      - Air Force Command and Control School
      - Air Force Technical School
      - Air Force Ground Signal Engineering School
      - Air Force Liaison and Staff Service School
  - Navy units:
    - MKV/Fo 32 - West Coast Naval Command / Gothenburg & Bohus Defense District, in Gothenburg
      - 12th Helicopter Group, at Säve Airfield with CH-46B Sea Knight anti-submarine and Bell 206B utility helicopters
      - KA 4 - Älvsborg Coastal Artillery Regiment, in Gothenburg
        - Three 75mm Tornpjäs m/57 batteries on Galterö, Marstrand and Stora Kornö islands, with the latter covering the entrance to the Gullmarn Naval Base
        - HSwMS Kalvsund (11) minelayer
        - HSwMS Grundsund (15) minelayer
      - 48th Patrol Boat Division in Gothenburg (part of 4th Surface Attack Flotilla of Milo S), with 4x Hugin-class patrol boats
        - HSwMS Hugin (P151)
        - HSwMS Munin (P152)
        - HSwMS Magne (P153)
        - HSwMS Mode (P1514

In wartime the Western Military District would have activated the following major land units, as well as a host of smaller units:

- 3rd Division, in Skövde
  - PB 9 - Skaraborg Brigade, in Skövde, a Type 63M armoured brigade based on the P 4 - Skaraborg Regiment
  - IB 15 - Västgöta Brigade, in Borås, a Type 66M infantry brigade based on the I 15 - Älvsborg Regiment
  - IB 17 - Bohus Brigade, in Uddevalla, a Type 66M infantry brigade based on the I 17 - Bohuslän Regiment
  - IB 45 - Älvsborg Brigade, in Borås, a Type 77 infantry brigade based on the I 15 - Älvsborg Regiment
  - IB 46 - Halland Brigade, in Halmstad, a Type 77 infantry brigade based on the I 16 - Halland Regiment
  - IB 47 - Gothenburg Brigade, in Uddevalla, a Type 77 infantry brigade based on the I 17 - Bohuslän Regiment

== Heraldry and traditions ==
=== Coat of arms ===
The coat of arms of the Western Military District Staff 1983–1993. Blazon: "Azur, an erect sword with the area letter (V - West) surrounded by an open chaplet of oak leaves, all or."

== Commanding officers ==
=== Military commanders ===
- 1942–1949: Folke Högberg
- 1949–1950: Sven Ryman
- 1950–1951: Carl Årmann
- 1951–1955: Sven Colliander
- 1955–1957: Thord Bonde
- 1957–1963: Richard Åkerman
- 1963–1966: Fale Burman
- 1966–1968: Oscar Krokstedt
- 1968–1972: Henrik Lange
- 1972–1978: Claës Skoglund (leave of absence 1974–1977)
- 1974–1976: Lennart Ljung (acting)
- 1976–1980: Nils Personne
- 1980–1983: Kjell Nordström
- 1983–1985: Bengt Rasin
- 1985–1989: Jan Enquist
- 1989–1993: Bertel Österdahl

=== Deputy military commanders ===
- 1942–1946: Helmer Bratt
- 1946–1950: Carl Årmann (acting)
- 1951–1955: Gustaf Källner
- 1955–1959: Carl Fredrik Lemmel
- 1959–1966: Carol Bennedich

=== Chiefs of Staff ===
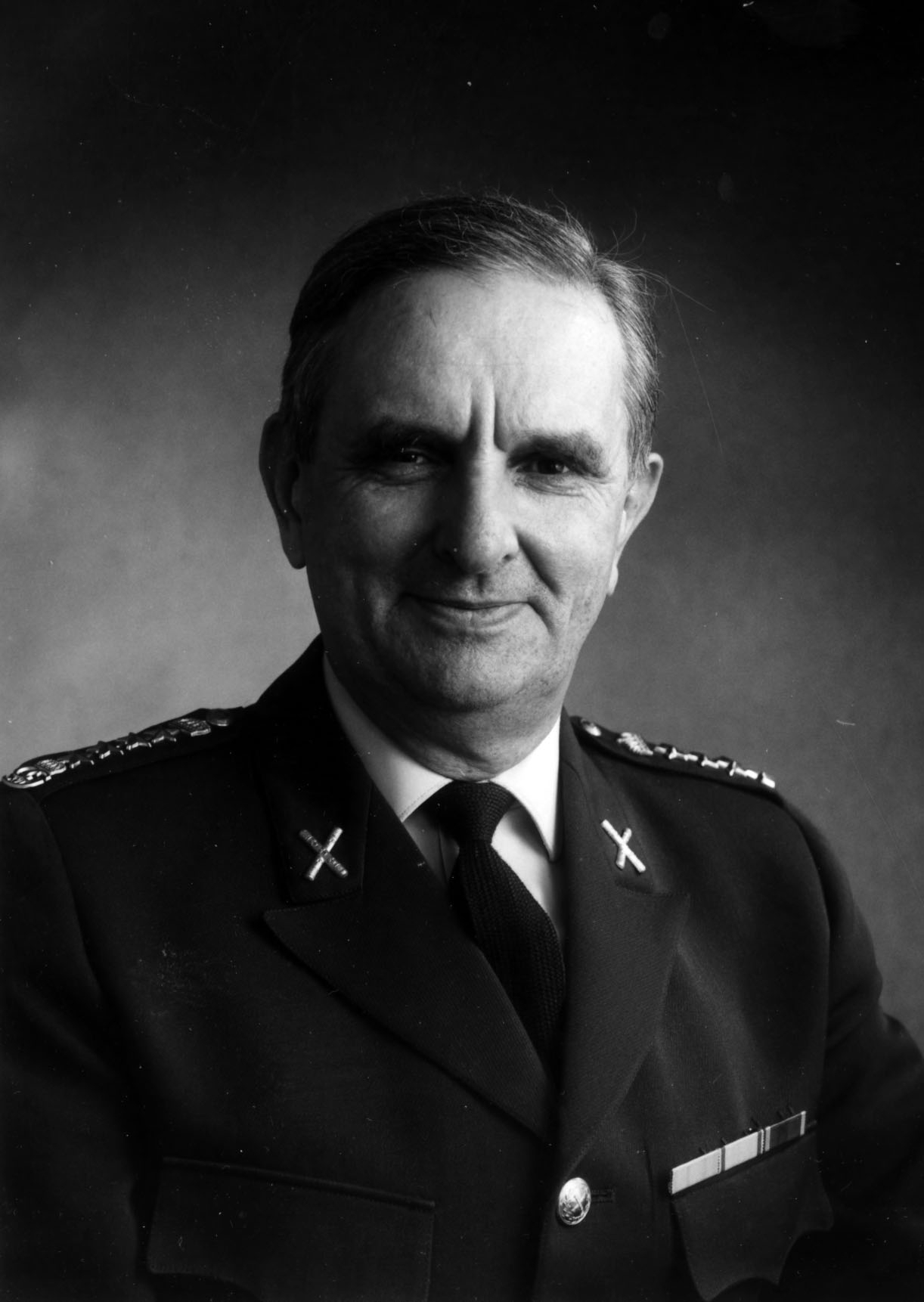
Senior colonel Magnus Olson as chief of staff (1984–1988)

- 1941–1943: Per Gösta Fridolf Jörlin
- 1943–1946: Fritz-Ivar Virgin
- 1946–1949: Bo Klint
- 1949–1951: Sven Holmberg
- 1951–1955: Gustav Frisén
- 1955–1961: Liss Johan Tage Broms
- 1961–1965: Sture Fornwall
- 1966–1968: Claës Skoglund
- 1968–1969: Nils Sköld
- 1969–1973: Bengt Liljestrand
- 1973–1977: Bengt Rasin
- 1977–1979: Robert Lugn
- 1979–1980: Gustaf Welin
- 1980–1982: Jan Enquist
- 1982–1984: Torsten Engberg
- 1984–1988: Magnus Olson
- 1988–1990: Nils Rosenqvist
- 1990–1992: Svante Kristenson
- 1993–1993: Vacant

== Names, designations and locations ==
Name	Translation	From		To
III. militärområdet	III Military District	1942-10-01	–	1966-09-30
Västra militärområdet	Western Military District	1966-10-01	–	1993-06-30
Designation		From		To
III. Milo		1942-10-01	–	1966-09-30
Milo V		1966-10-01	–	1993-06-30
Location		From		To
Skövde garrison		1942-10-01	–	1993-06-30

== See also ==
- Military district (Sweden)
