= Rolf Rheborg =

Swedish Navy officer (1922–1983)

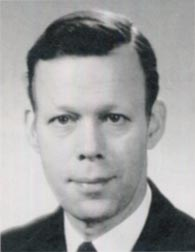
- Born: Rolf Sigurdsson Rheborg; 7 March 1922; Gothenburg, Sweden
- Died: 8 August 1983 (aged 61); London, United Kingdom
- Burial place: Norra begravningsplatsen, Stockholm
- Military career
- Branch: Swedish Navy
- Service years: 1943–1983
- Rank: Rear Admiral
- Commands: HSwMS Svärdfisken; HSwMS Sjöborren; 1st Submarine Flotilla; Royal Swedish Naval Academy; Section 3, Naval Staff; Chief of Staff, Milo S

Rear Admiral Rolf Sigurdsson Rheborg (7 March 1922 – 8 August 1983) was a Swedish Navy officer. Rheborg served as head of the Royal Swedish Naval Academy (1969–1971), as head of Section 3 in the Naval Staff (1971–1973) and as Chief of Staff of the Southern Military District (1973–1978) in Kristianstad.

== Early life ==
Rheborg was born on 7 March 1922 in Nya Varvet Parish in Gothenburg and Bohus County, Sweden, the son of Sigurd Rheborg, a commander in the Swedish Naval Quartermaster Corps, and his wife Stina Weijdling. Rheborg passed studentexamen at Karlskrona högre allmänna läroverk in Karlskrona in 1940.

== Career ==
Rheborg graduated from the Royal Swedish Naval Academy in 1943 and was commissioned as a naval officer in the Swedish Navy the same year with the rank of acting sub-lieutenant. Rheborg was a submariner and later commanded the submarines HSwMS Svärdfisken and HSwMS Sjöborren. He was promoted to sub-lieutenant in 1945 and served as a cadet officer at the Royal Swedish Naval Academy from 1945 to 1946. Rheborg served in the Naval Staff from 1947 to 1948 and 1950 he attended the Staff Course at the Royal Swedish Naval Staff College from 1951 to 1952. He was promoted to lieutenant in 1952 and served in the Planning Department of the Naval Staff from 1953 to 1955, after which he was a teacher in tactics at the Royal Swedish Naval Staff College from 1955 to 1956. Rheborg served as flag adjutant staff of the Commander-in-Chief of the Coastal Fleet and also did rehearsal training at the Royal Swedish Naval Staff College from 1956 to 1958 and served in the Submarine Service Department in the Naval Staff from 1958 to 1960.

He was promoted to lieutenant commander in 1960, after which he was a teacher of naval tactics at the Royal Swedish Naval Staff College from 1960 to 1961. Rheborg then served as a teacher in tactics and staff service at the Swedish Armed Forces Staff College from 1961 to 1964, and was promoted to commander in 1961, and then served as commander of the 1st Submarine Flotilla from 1964 to 1965. He was head of the Weapons Department in Section 3 of the Naval Staff from 1965 to 1966 and was head of the Planning Department in the Naval Staff from 1966 to 1969. Rheborg was promoted to captain in 1969, whereupon he was head of the Royal Swedish Naval Academy from 1969 to 1971 and head of Section 3 in the Naval Staff from 1971 to 1973. Rheborg was promoted to rear admiral in 1973 and was chief of staff at the staff in the Southern Military District from 1973 to 1978 and from 1979 until his death in 1983, he served as naval attaché at the Swedish embassy in London also non-resident army, naval and air attaché at the Swedish embassy in The Hauge.

Rheborg was the 3rd Inspector Emeriti of the SjöLund naval academy association.

== Personal life ==
In 1943, Rheborg married Ingegerd Klinga (born 1920), the daughter of engineer Ivar Klinga and Greta (née Steinbeck). They had three children: Hans, Agneta och Anne.

== Death ==
Rheborg died on 8 August 1983 in London, United Kingdom while serving as naval attaché at the Swedish embassy. He was interred on 11 October 1983 at Norra begravningsplatsen in Stockholm.

== Dates of rank ==
- 1943 – Acting sub-lieutenant
- 1945 – Sub-lieutenant
- 1952 – Lieutenant
- 1960 – Lieutenant commander
- 1963 – Commander
- 1969 – Captain
- 1973 – Rear admiral

== Awards and decorations ==
- (Sweden) Commander of the Order of the Sword (1972)
- (Sweden) Knight 1st Class of the Order of the Sword (1961)

== Honours ==
- Member of the Royal Swedish Society of Naval Sciences (1961)
- Honorary member of the Royal Swedish Society of Naval Sciences (1973)
- Member of the Royal Swedish Academy of War Sciences (1969)

Military offices
| Preceded by ? | 1st Submarine Flotilla; 1964–1965 | Succeeded by Hans Petrelius |
| Preceded by Willy Edenberg | Royal Swedish Naval Academy; 1969–1971 | Succeeded by Rolf Skedelius |
| Preceded by Lars Lundberg | Section 3, Naval Staff; 1971–1973 | Succeeded by Alf Berggren |
| Preceded by Sigmund Ahnfelt | Chief of Staff, Southern Military District; 1973–1978 | Succeeded by Bror Stefenson |
