= Southern Military District (Milo S) =

Former military unit in Sweden

- Södra militärområdet
- Active: 1942–2000
- Country: Sweden
- Allegiance: Swedish Armed Forces
- Branch: Multi (Sea, Air and Land)
- Type: Military district
- Role: Operational, territorial and tactical operations
- Garrison/HQ: Kristianstad
- March: "På marsch" (Rydberg) (Note: The march was adopted in 1994 and was established on 13 June 1996. It was used by the Southern Military District from 2000 to 2005.)

Insignia
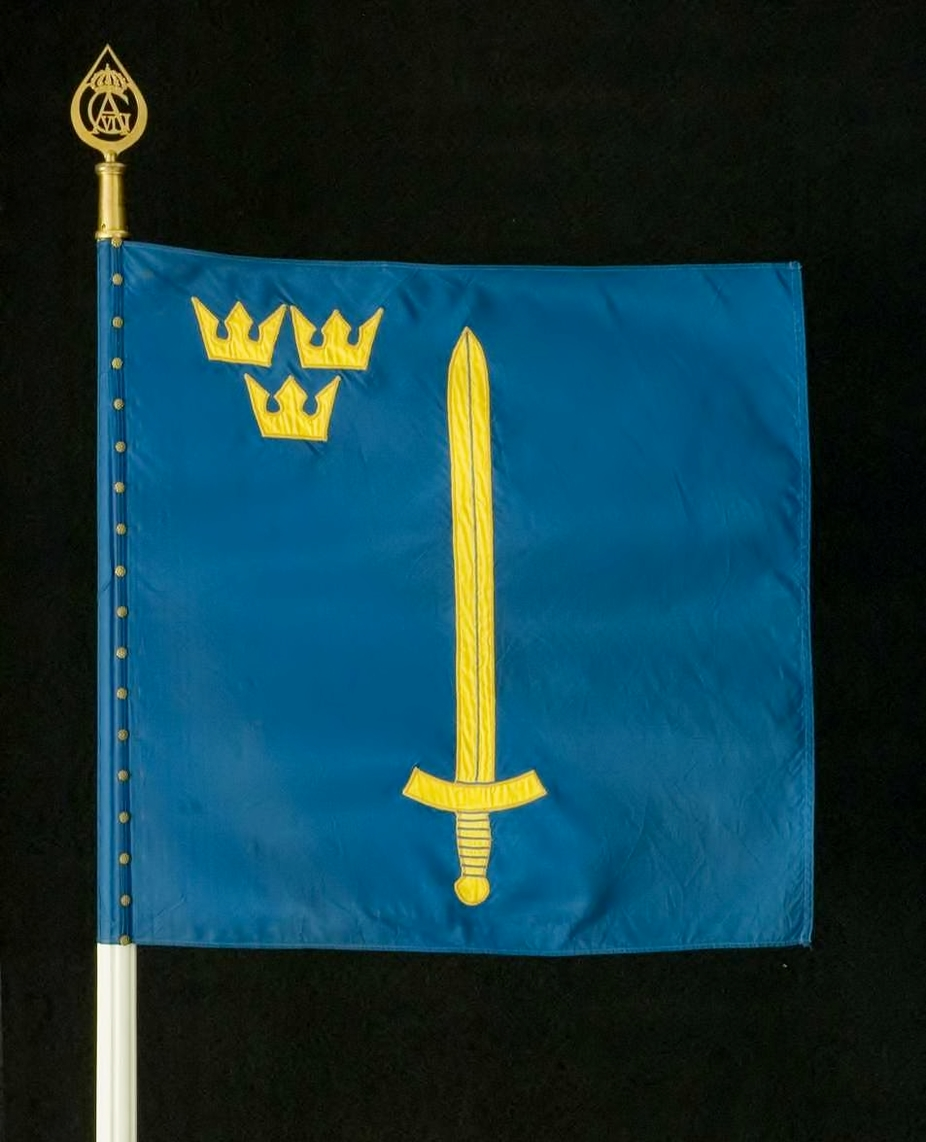
- Command flag

Southern Military District (Swedish: Södra militärområdet, Milo S), originally I Military District (Swedish: I. militärområdet) was a Swedish military district, a command of the Swedish Armed Forces that had operational control over Southern Sweden, for most time of its existence corresponding to the area covered by the counties of Malmöhus, Kristianstad (now joined as Skåne County), Blekinge, Kronoberg, Jönköping and Kalmar. The headquarters of Milo S were located in Kristianstad.

== History ==
Milo S was created in 1966 along with five other military districts as part of a reorganisation of the administrative divisions of the Swedish Armed Forces. It can be seen as the successor of the I Military District (I. militärområdet) created in 1942, but that did not have the same tasks as Milo S. The military district consisted of the land covered by the above-mentioned counties, with the exception of a small part of northern Kalmar County which instead was part of the Eastern Military District (Milo Ö) until 1983 when the whole county's area was incorporated into Milo S. In 1993, the number of military districts of Sweden was decreased to three, and as a consequence of that, Western Military District (Milo V) was merged with Milo S to form a new southern military district. In 2000, these last three military districts were disbanded and the command for the whole of Sweden was placed at the Swedish Armed Forces Headquarters, in accordance with the Defence Act of 2000.

== Units 1989 ==
In peacetime the Southern Military District consisted of the following units, which were training recruits for wartime units:

- Southern Military District (Milo S), in Kristianstad
  - Army units:
    - P 2 - Scanian Dragoon Regiment, in Hässleholm
    - P 6/Fo 14 - North Scanian Regiment / Kristianstad Defense District, in Kristianstad
      - Army Mechanic School
    - P 7/Fo 11 - South Scanian Regiment / Malmö Defense District, in Ystad
    - I 11/Fo 16/18 - Kronoberg Regiment / Kronoberg and Kalmar Defense Districts, in Växjö
    - I 12/Fo 17 - Northern Småland Regiment / Jönköping Defense District, in Eksjö
    - A 3 - Wendes Artillery Regiment, in Kristianstad
    - Lv 4 - Scanian Anti-Aircraft Regiment, in Ystad
    - Ing 2 - Göta Engineer Regiment, in Eksjö
    - T 4 - Scanian Logistic Regiment, in Hässleholm
  - Air Force units:
    - F 5 - Swedish Air Force Flying School, in Ljungbyhed
      - 1st Training Squadron with Saab 105A advanced jet trainers
      - 2nd Training Squadron with Saab 105A advanced jet trainers
      - 3rd Training Squadron with Saab 105A advanced jet trainers
      - 4th Training Squadron (Reserve Officers Training)
      - 5th Training Squadron (Basic Flight Training) with SK 61A and SK 61B planes
      - Basic Flight School
      - Combat Flight School
      - Civil Aviation School
      - Aerial Navigation School
      - Air Force Meteorology School
    - F 10/Se S - Scania Wing / Air Defense Sector South (covering Milo S and Milo V), in Ängelholm
      - 101st Fighter Squadron, with J 35J Draken fighter aircraft
      - 102nd Fighter Squadron, with J 35J Draken fighter aircraft
      - 103rd Fighter Squadron, with J 35J Draken fighter aircraft
    - F 17 - Blekinge Wing, in Kallinge
      - 171st Fighter Squadron, with JA 37 Viggen fighter aircraft
      - 172nd Recce Squadron, with SF 37 Viggen photo reconnaissance aircraft and SH 37 Viggen maritime reconnaissance/strike aircraft
  - Navy units:
    - BoMö - Malmö Naval Surveillance, in Malmö
    - ÖrlB S/Fo 15 - South Coast Naval Base / Karlskrona Defense District, in Karlskrona
      - 13th Helicopter Group, at Ronneby Airfield with CH-46B Sea Knight anti-submarine and Bell 206B utility helicopters, and one CASA C-212 Aviocar in anti-submarine configuration
      - KA 2 - Karlskrona Coastal Artillery Regiment, in Karlskrona
        - Fortress Battalion, with seven 75mm Tornpjäs m/57 batteries in Malmö, Trelleborg, Ystad, Simrishamn, Karlshamn, Järnavik and Aspö, and two 120mm Tornautomatpjäs m/70 batteries in Trelleborg and Ystad
        - 1st Coastal Artillery Battalion with three batteries with 4x mobile 120mm M/80 cannons each for Scania
        - 3rd Coastal Artillery Battalion with three batteries with 4x mobile 120mm M/80 cannons each for Blekinge
        - 1st Mobile Blocking Battalion with one battery with 3x mobile 75mm m/65 guns, one battery with light Robot 52 anti-ship missiles, and a mining troop in Västervik to defend the Orrfjärd Navy Base
        - 6th Mobile Blocking Battalion with one battery with 3x mobile 75mm m/65 guns, one battery with light Robot 52 anti-ship missiles, and a mining troop for the Eastern coast of Scania
        - Heavy Coastal Missile Battery with Robot 08 anti-ship missiles
        - Unknown number of Mobile Blocking Companies consisting of a light Robot 52 anti-ship missile troop, and a mining troop
        - HSwMS Kalmarsund (13) minelayer
        - HSwMS Öresund (18) minelayer
      - 4th Surface Attack Flotilla, in Karlskrona
        - 44th Missile Boat Division, with 6x Norrköping-class missile boats
          - HSwMS Norrköping (R131)
          - HSwMS Nynäshamn (R132)
          - HSwMS Norrtälje (R133)
          - HSwMS Varberg (R134)
          - HSwMS Västerås (R135)
          - HSwMS Västervik (R136)
        - 46th Patrol Boat Division, with 4x Hugin-class patrol boats
          - HSwMS Styrbjörn (P163)
          - HSwMS Starkodder (P164)
          - HSwMS Tordön (P165)
          - HSwMS Tirfing (P166)

In wartime the Southern Military District would have activated the following major land units, as well as a host of smaller units:

- 1st Division, in Kristianstad
- 13th (Armoured) Division, in Kristianstad
  - PB 7 - Malmö Brigade, in Revingehed, a Type 63M armoured brigade based on the P 7 - South Scanian Regiment
  - PB 8 - Göinge Brigade, in Hässleholm, a Type 63M armoured brigade based on the P 2 - Scania Dragoon Regiment
  - IB 11 - Kronoberg Brigade, in Växjö, a Type 77 infantry brigade based on the I 11 - Kronoberg Regiment
  - IB 12 - Jönköping Brigade, in Eksjö, a Type 66M infantry brigade based on the I 12 - North Småland Regiment
  - PB 26 - Kristianstad Brigade, in Kristianstad, a Type 63M armoured brigade based on the P 6 - North Scania Regiment
  - IB 41 - Blekinge Brigade, in Växjö, a Type 66M infantry brigade based on the I 11 - Kronoberg Regiment
  - IB 42 - Kalmar Brigade, in Eksjö, a Type 77 infantry brigade based on the I 12 - North Småland Regiment

== Heraldry and traditions ==
=== Coat of arms ===
The coat of arms of the Southern Military District Staff 1983–1994. Blazon: "Azur, an erect sword with the area letter (S - South) surrounded by an open chaplet of oak leaves, all or."

The coat of arms of the Southern Military District Staff 1994–2000. It was also used by the Southern Military District 2000–2005 and the Western Military Region 2018–present. Blazon: "Azure, with waves argent six times divided bendy-sinister argent, charged with a doubletailed crowned lion rampant or, armed and langued gules. The shield surmounted an erect sword or."

Coat of arms of the Southern Military District Staff 1983–1994.

Coat of the arms of the Southern Military District Staff 1994–2000, the Southern Military District 2000–2005 and the Western Military Region 2018–present.

=== Medals ===
In 2000, the Södra militärområdesstabens (MilostabS) minnesmedalj ("Southern Military District Staff (MilostabS) Commemorative Medal") in silver (MiloSSMM) of the 8th size was established. The medal is oval in shape and the medal ribbon is of yellow moiré with blue edges and a blue stripe on each side.

== Commanding officers ==
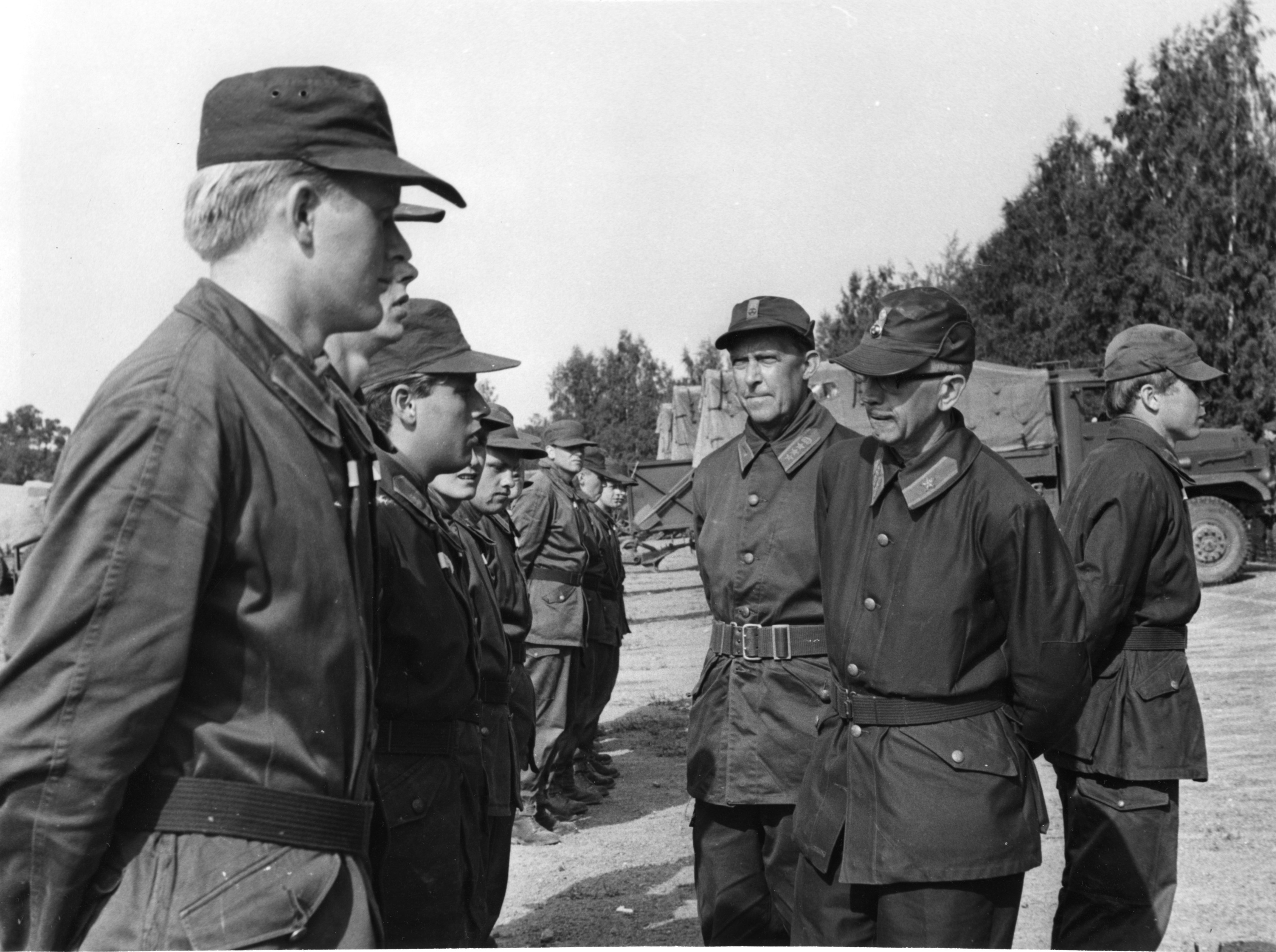
Chief of Staff, Major General Sigmund Ahnfelt (2nd from right) inspects Småland Artillery Regiment (A 6) in 1968.

=== Military commanders ===
- 1942–1947: Major General Ernst af Klercker
- 1947–1947: Major General Carl August Ehrensvärd
- 1948–1953: Major General Samuel Åkerhielm
- 1953–1961: Major General Viking Tamm
- 1961–1963: Major General Curt Göransson
- 1963–1966: Major General Tage Olihn
- 1966–1968: Lieutenant General Stig Norén
- 1968–1972: Vice Admiral Oscar Krokstedt
- 1972–1980: Lieutenant General Karl Eric Holm
- 1980–1982: Lieutenant General Sven-Olof Olson
- 1982–1984: Vice Admiral Bengt Schuback
- 1984–1988: Lieutenant General Carl Björeman
- 1988–1992: Lieutenant General Gustaf Welin
- 1992–1994: Lieutenant General Owe Wiktorin
- 1994–1998: Lieutenant General Sven-Åke Jansson
- 1998–2000: Lieutenant General Kent Harrskog

=== Deputy military commanders ===
- 1942–1943: Major general Hugo Gadd
- 1943–1946: Colonel Sven Colliander
- 1946–1948: Colonel Viking Tamm
- 1948–1953: Colonel Sven Erhard Öberg
- 1953–1954: Colonel Karl Ångström
- 1955–1962: Lieutenant colonel Miles Flach
- 1963–1966: Colonel Stig Löfgren
- 1966–1973: Major general Sigmund Ahnfelt

=== Chiefs of Staff ===
- 1942–1945: Lieutenant colonel Miles Flach
- 1945–1949: Lieutenant colonel James Axel John Maulé
- 1949–1951: Lieutenant colonel Wilhelm Reuterswärd
- 1951–1954: Lieutenant colonel Fred Ljunggren
- 1954–1957: Lieutenant colonel Carl Gustav Henrik Gideon Linnell
- 1957–1959: Major Ove Ljung
- 1959–1966: Lieutenant colonel Valter Thomé
- 1966–1966: Lieutenant colonel Kjell Nordström
- 1966–1973: Major general Sigmund Ahnfelt
- 1973–1978: Rear admiral Rolf Rheborg
- 1978–1979: Rear admiral Bror Stefenson
- 1980–1984: Major general Carl Björeman
- 1984–1988: Rear admiral Göran Wallén
- 1988–1991: Rear admiral Peter Nordbeck
- 1991–1993: Senior colonel Hans Arne Hansson
- 1993–1994: Major general Bertel Österdahl
- 1994–1999: Major general Ulf Rubarth
- 1999–2000: Senior colonel Mats Welff

== Names, designations and locations ==
Name	Translation	From		To
I. militärområdet	I Military District	1942-10-01	–	1966-09-30
Södra militärområdet	Southern Military District	1966-10-01	–	2000-06-30
Avvecklingsorganisation	Decommissioning Organisation	2000-07-01	–	2001-03-31
Designation		From		To
I. Milo		1942-10-01	–	1966-09-30
Milo S		1966-10-01	–	2000-06-30
Location		From		To
Kristianstad Garrison		1942-07-06	–	2001-03-31

== See also ==
- Military district (Sweden)
