= Astrid Ahnfelt =

Swedish writer, translator and journalist

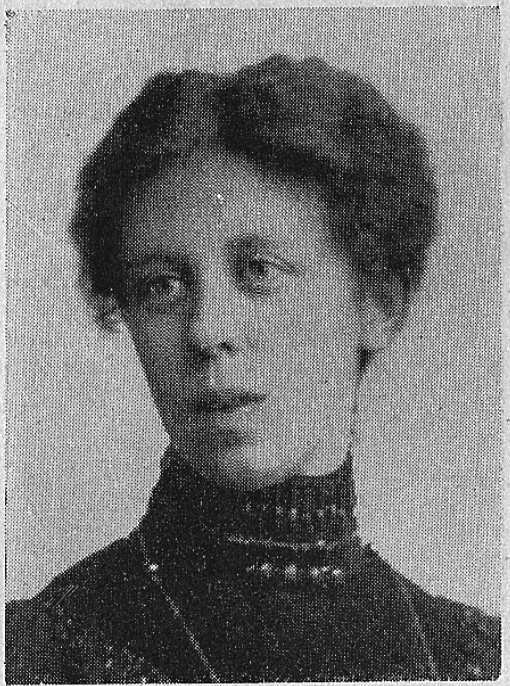
Astrid Ahnfelt

Astrid Ahnfelt (1876–1962) was a Swedish author, translator, foreign correspondent, and journal editor who wrote short stories and novels in both Swedish and Italian. She is remembered principally for fostering cultural exchanges between Sweden and Italy. Her novel I blindo (1908) about Swedes living in Italy is partly autobiographical.

== Biography ==
Born on 31 March 1876 in Stockholm, Astrid Ahnfelt was the daughter of the journal editor Arvid Ahnfelt (1846–1890) and Hilda Runnerström (1844–1927), a businesswoman. Her grandfather, the cleric Paul Gabriel Ahnfelt (1803–1863), had also been active as a writer. Raised in literary circles, Ahnfelt associated with the writer Ellen Key who arranged for her to become a nanny for a Swedish family in Tuscany in 1897. A year later, she moved to Rome where she earned a living working as a cultural correspondent for Swedish newspapers and magazines, commenting on Italian authors including the Nobel prize-winning poet Giosue Carducci.

Fluent in both Swedish and Italian, Ahnfelt began publishing books in 1902 with two short stories in Italian in La lacrima nel mare del dolore e La sposa della morte followed by Sagor och legender, a collection of short stories in Swedish in 1905. Her first novel, Nutidsungdom providing insights into Italy's young people, was published in Sweden the same year. Her novel I blindo (1908), also published in Sweden, received a mixed reception. Based on the lives of Swedes living in Italy, it is partly autobiographical. Contributing to the Swedish journal Idun, Ahnfelt provided accounts of the 1908 earthquake in Messina where she served as a nurse and helped the victims. In 1910, they were published in Italian as the book Foglie al vento.

Around 1910, Ahnfelt gave birth to a son, Silvano Attico, but never revealed the name of his father. After a period in Florence during World War I, she moved to Naples where she worked in a library and at the Swedish consulate while publishing translations into Swedish. From the early 1930s, as a supporter of Mussolini, Ahnfelt experienced difficulty in having her works published in Sweden. She made a living as a proofreader for Il Giornale d'Italia.

Ahnfelt died in Italy, probably in Rome, in 1962. Her son had previously died in a motorcycle accident.
