= Engelbrekt Parish =

Engelbrekt Parish Engelbrekts församling
- Parish
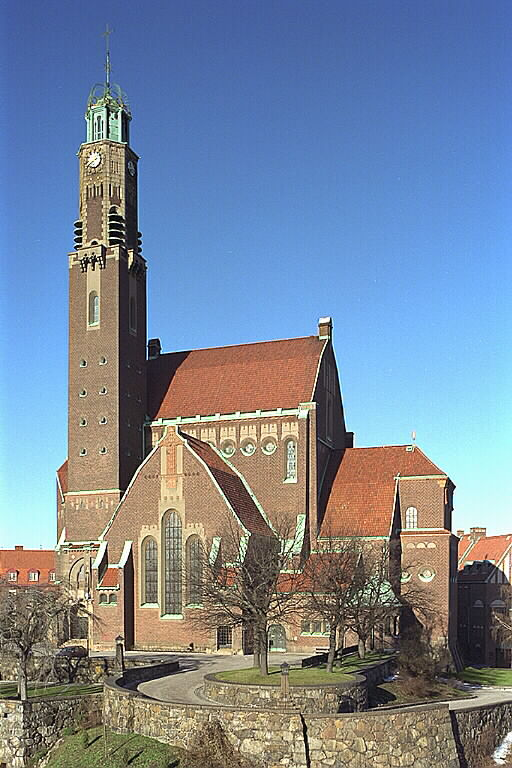
- Engelbrekt Church

- Location within Stockholm Location within Sweden
- Coordinates: 59°20′38″N 18°04′03″E
- Country: Sweden
- Municipality: Stockholm Municipality
- Religious congregation: Church of Sweden
- Diocese: Diocese of Stockholm
- Founded: 1 May 1906

Government
  - Vicar: ?

Population (2016)
  - Total: 25,000
- Parish code: 018010 (1952-01-01–1966-12-31) and 018009 (1967-01-01–)
- Pastorship code: 131103
- Website: www.svenskakyrkan.se/engelbrekt

Engelbrekt Parish (Swedish: Engelbrekts församling) is a parish in Östermalm's church district (kontrakt) in the Diocese of Stockholm, Sweden. The parish is located in Stockholm Municipality in Stockholm County. The parish forms its own pastorship.

== History ==
Engelbrekt Parish was formed on 1 May 1906 (by decision of 15 April 1904) through an outbreak of Hedvig Eleonora Parish. The parish has composed its own pastorship since 1 May 1906.

== Location ==
Engelbrekt Parish includes covers an area from the northern tip of Ålkistan, the eastern tip of Värtahamnen and the southern tip of Stureplan. The border with Stockholm City Centre follows Tegeluddsvägen, Lidingövägen, Brahegatan and Birger Jarlsgatan.
