= List of admirals of Sweden =

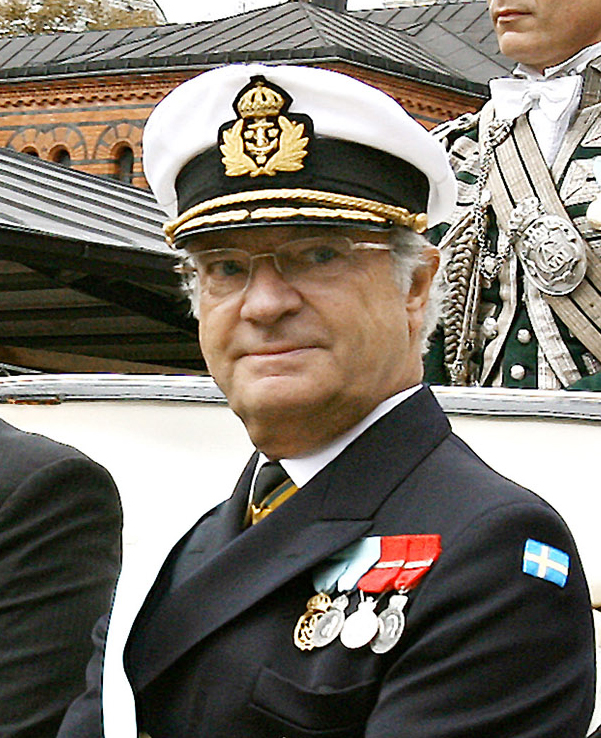
King Carl XVI Gustaf of Sweden in admiral's uniform

Admirals of Sweden have existed since 1522.

== History ==
In Sweden, the admiral's rank first appeared during the reign of Gustav I, who in 1522 gave it to Erik Fleming, a Council of the Realm. During Gustav's reign as king and throughout the latter part of the 16th century, the highest command of a fleet was led by a översteamiral ("colonel admiral"), to whose assistant a underamiral was appointed. It was not until 1569 that a permanent översteamiral was appointed; In 1602 the title was exchanged for riksamiral ("Admiral of the Realm"). The first permanent underamiral was appointed in 1575; his office ceased in 1619. Vice admiral is first mentioned in 1577. The admirals of the Swedish Navy have, incidentally, been as follows: generalamiral ("general admiral"), amiralgeneral ("admiral general"), storamiral ("grand admiral"), överamiral, riksviceamiral ("Vice Admiral of the Realm"), amiralgenerallöjtnant ("admiral lieutenant general"), amirallöjtnant ("lieutenant admiral"), schoutbynacht and konteramiral ("rear admiral").

== Riksamiraler (Admirals of the Realm) ==
1. Clas Eriksson Fleming 1571–1595
2. Joachim Scheel 1596–1602
3. Axel Nilsson Ryning 1602–1611
4. Göran Nilsson Gyllenstierna 1611–1618
5. Carl Gyllenhielm 1620–1650
6. Gabriel Bengtsson Oxenstierna 1652–1656
7. Carl Gustaf Wrangel 1657–1664
8. Gustav Otto Stenbock 1664–1675

== Amiralgeneraler (Admiral Generals) ==
1. Hans Wachtmeister 1681
2. Lorentz Creutz Sr. 1675

== Generalamiraler (General Admirals) ==
1. Henrik Horn 1677
2. Henrik af Trolle 1780
3. Anton Johan Wrangel the elder 1784
4. Carl August Ehrensvärd 1792
5. Johan af Puke 1812
6. Victor von Stedingk 1818
7. Rudolf Cederström 1823

== Överamiraler ==
1. Claes Sparre 1715
2. Edvard Didrik Taube 1734
3. Carl Georg Siöblad 1747
4. Johan Gustaf Lagerbjelke 1809

== Amirallöjtnanter (Lieutenant Admirals) ==
1. Herman Fleming 1645

== Amiraler (Admirals) ==
1. Ivar Fleming 1534
2. Jakob Bagge 1555
3. Nils Jespersson Kruse 1563
4. Klas Kristersson Horn af Åminne 1564
5. Bengt Halstensson Bagge 1569
6. Herman Fleming 1574
7. Hans Claësson Bjelkenstjerna 1611
8. Clas Fleming 1620
9. Nils Göransson Stiernsköld 1627
10. Åke Ulfsparre 1640
11. Mårten Anckarhielm 1653
12. Göran Göransson Gyllenstierna the elder 1640
13. Klas Hansson Bjelkenstjerna 1654
14. Sten Nilsson Bielke 1657
15. Nils Brahe the younger 1660
16. Claes Nilsson Stiernsköld 1661
17. Claes Uggla 1670
18. Erik Carlsson Sjöblad 1676
19. Hans Clerck 1676
20. Johan Bär 1676
21. Johan Olofsson Bergenstierna 1676
22. Gustaf Adolph Sparre 1690
23. Cornelius Anckarstjerna 1692
24. Evert Fredrik Taube 1700
25. Jacob De Prou 1709
26. Axel Johan Lewenhaupt 1712
27. Gustaf Wattrang 1712
28. Erik Johan Lillie 1715
29. Gustaf von Psilander 1715
30. Mikael Henck 1715
31. Carl Henrik von Löwe 1719
32. Jonas Fredrik Örnfelt 1719
33. Olof Strömstierna 1719
34. Nils Ehrenschiöld 1721
35. Olof von Unge 1734
36. Gustaf Grubbe 1736
37. Jean von Utfall 1742
38. Theodor Ankarcrona 1742
39. Abraham Falkengréen 1749
40. Carl Hans Sparre 1754
41. Erik Arvid Sparre 1755
42. Didrik Henrik Taube 1768
43. Nils Lillienanckar 1771
44. Carl Vilhelm Modée 1793
45. Salomon von Rajalin 1809
46. Henrik Johan Nauckhoff 1817
47. Magnus Palmqvist 1818
48. Per Gustaf Lagerstråle 1818
49. Carl Fredrik Coyet 1827
50. Johan Lagerbielke 1827
51. Otto Gustaf Nordensköld 1845
52. Johan Henrik Kreüger 1857
53. Carl August Gyllengranat 1858
54. Christian Anders Sundin 1884
55. Fredrik von Otter 1900
56. Hjalmar af Klintberg 1903
57. King Gustav V 1907
58. Louis Palander af Vega 1910
59. Carl Hjulhammar 1911
60. Wilhelm Dyrssen 1923
61. Carl August Ehrensvärd 1924
62. Henning von Krusenstierna 1927
63. Otto Lybeck 1936
64. Fabian Tamm 1947
65. King Gustaf VI Adolf 1950
66. Stig H:son Ericson 1961
67. The Duke of Halland 1969
68. Åke Lindemalm 1970
69. King Carl XVI Gustaf 1973
70. Bengt Lundvall 1978
71. Bror Stefenson 1991

=== Insignias ===
Admiral

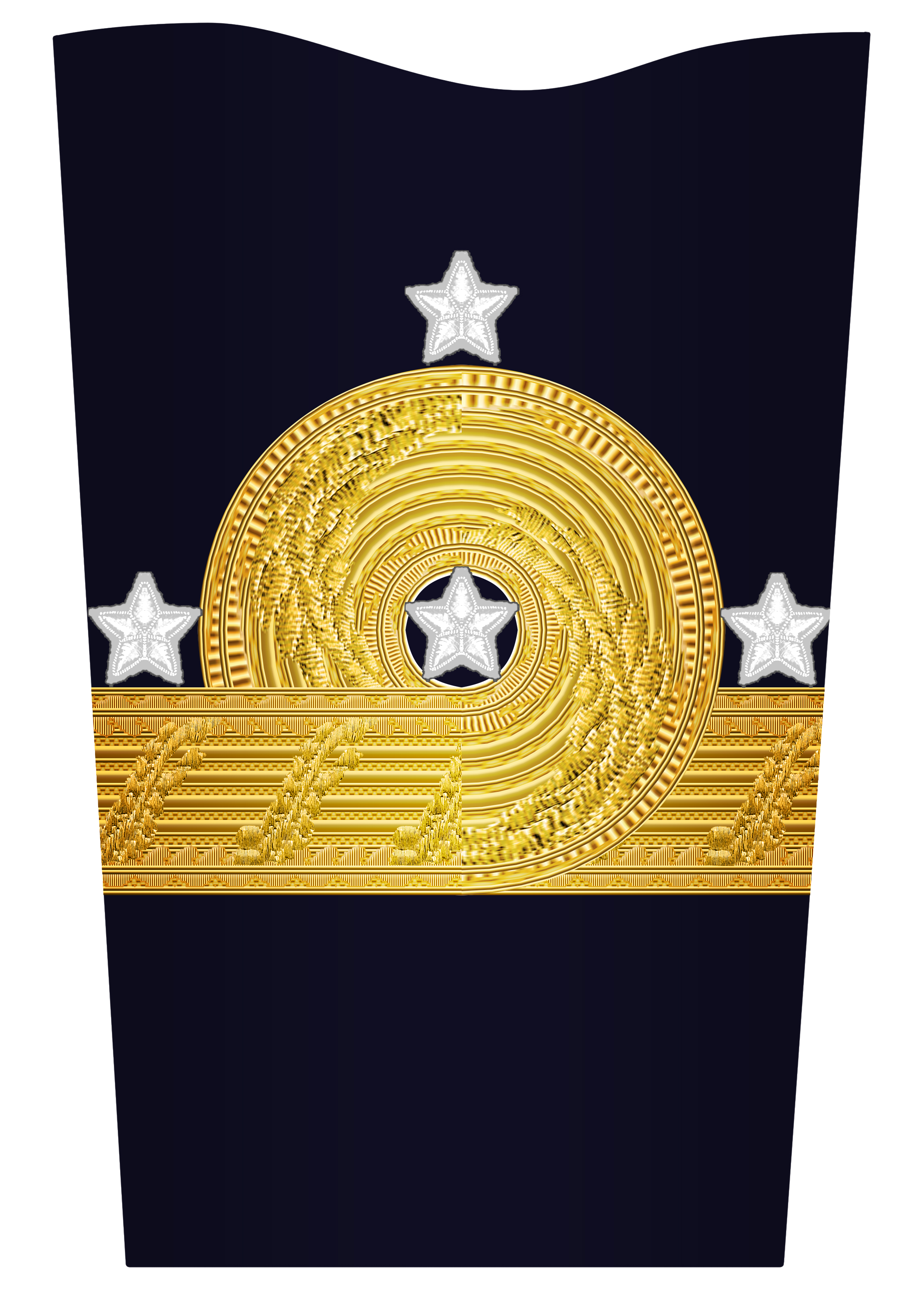
Pre-2003 sleeve insignia for a four star admiral

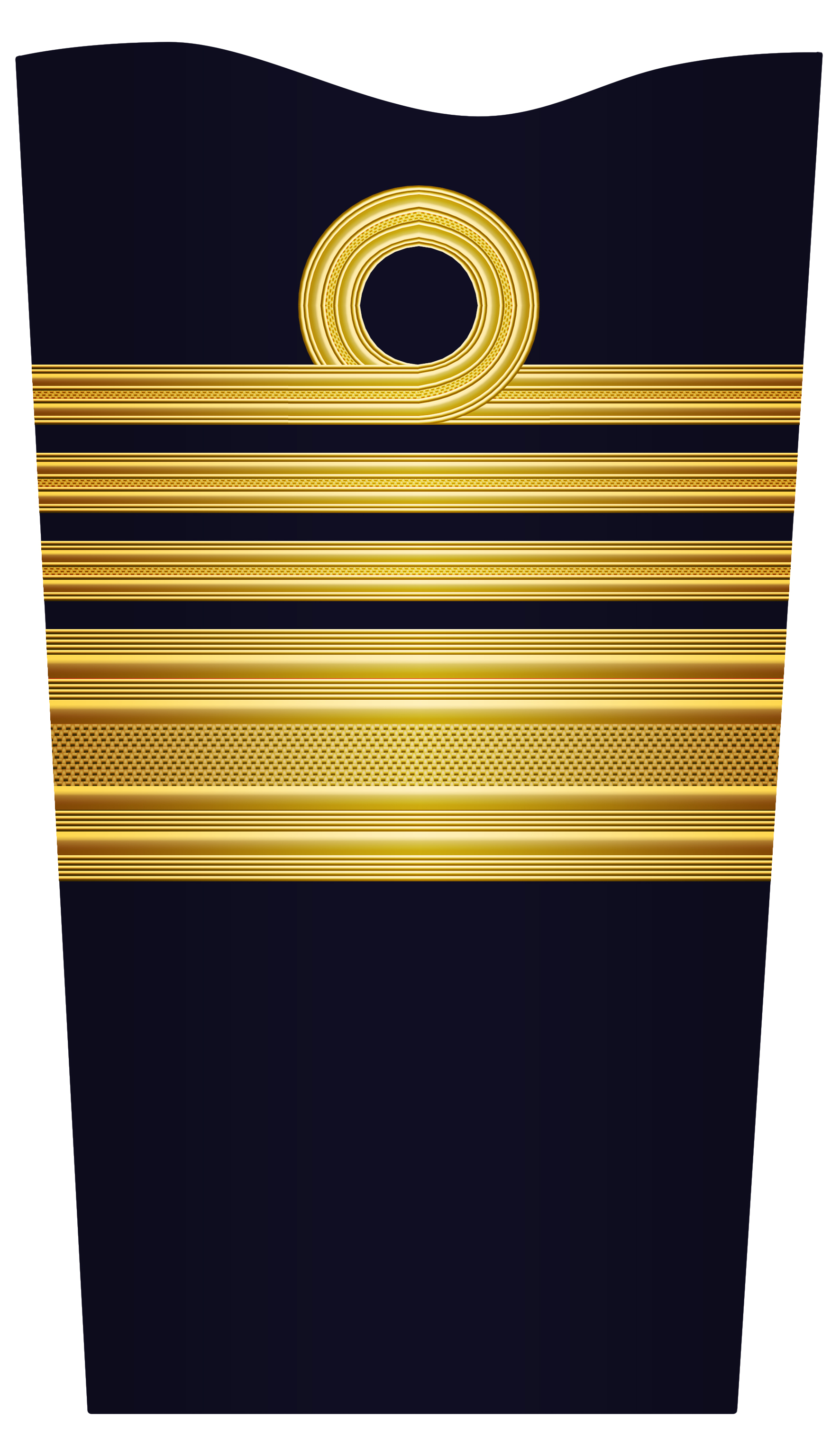
Insignia for Admiral (OF-9) in the Swedish Navy.

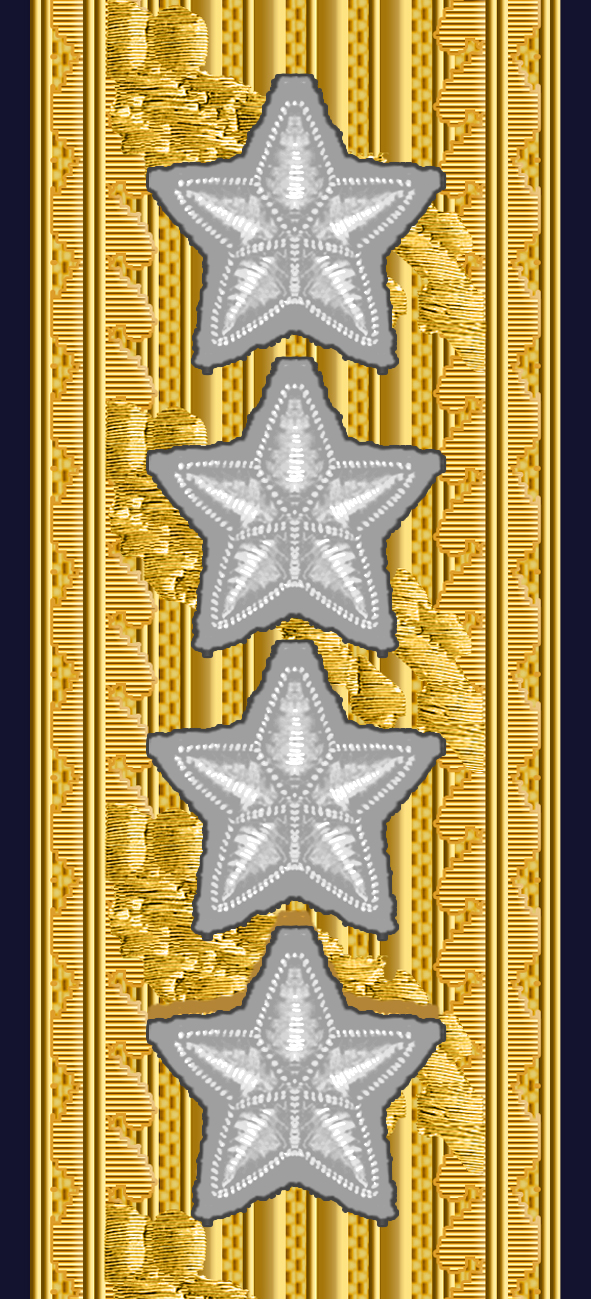
Shoulder mark of a Swedish four star admiral

Admiral flag

Admiral command flag 1875–1905

Admiral command flag 1815–1844

== Viceamiraler (Vice Admirals) ==
1. Henrik Fleming 1628
2. Peter Blume 1644
3. Richard Clerck 1657
4. Nils Ehrenschiöld 1716
5. Olof von Unge 1734
6. Anton Johan Wrangel the elder 1740
7. Thomas von Rajalin 1741
8. Hans Anckarcrantz 1754
9. Axel Lagerbielke 1758
10. Nils Brahe the younger 1760
11. Johan von Rajalin 1765
12. Sebald Hertman von Graman 1765
13. Christopher Falkengréen 1769
14. Carl Tersmeden 1774
15. Johan Nordenankar 1776
16. Otto Henrik Nordenskjöld 1790
17. Fredrik Henrik af Chapman 1791
18. Carl Olof Cronstedt 1801
19. Baltzar von Platen 1814
20. Carl Johan af Wirsén 1825
21. Gustaf af Klint 1825
22. Carl Reinhold Nordenskiöld 1858
23. Carl Gustaf von Otter 1889
24. Philip Virgin 1889
25. Knut Peyron 1897
26. Jarl Christerson 1898
27. The Count of Wisborg 1903
28. Carl Olsen 1908
29. Ludvig Sidner 1911
30. Gustaf Dyrssen 1917
31. Gustaf Lagercrantz 1919
32. Carl Alarik Wachtmeister 1925
33. Henry Lindberg 1925
34. Fredrik Riben 1930
35. John Schneidler 1932
36. Charles de Champs 1934
37. Harald Åkermark 1934
38. Claës Lindsström 1942
39. Hans Simonsson 1945
40. Helge Strömbäck 1945
41. Gunnar Bjurner 1947
42. Gösta Ehrensvärd 1950
43. Erik Anderberg 1957
44. Erik Samuelson 1958
45. Gunnar Jedeur-Palmgren 1962
46. Erik af Klint 1966
47. Bertil Berthelsson 1967
48. Oscar Krokstedt 1968
49. Sigurd Lagerman 1968
50. Holger Henning 1970
51. Einar Blidberg 1971
52. Karl Segrell 1971
53. Per Rudberg 1978
54. Bengt Schuback 1978
55. Dick Börjesson 1990
56. Peter Nordbeck 1994
57. Frank Rosenius 1998
58. Jan Thörnqvist 2016
59. Jonas Haggren 2018
60. Ewa Skoog Haslum 2024

=== Insignias ===
Vice admiral

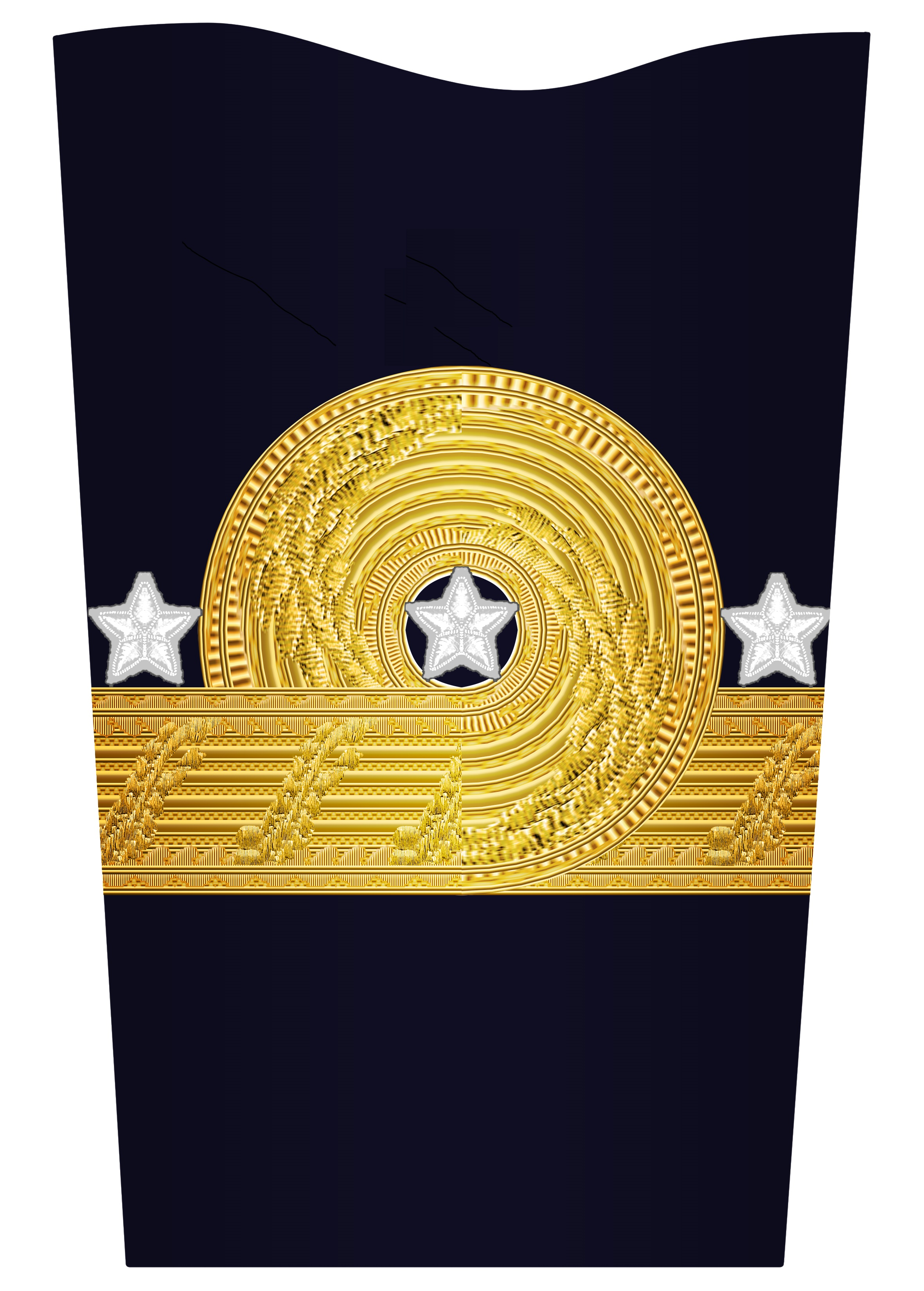
Pre-2003 sleeve insignia for a three star admiral

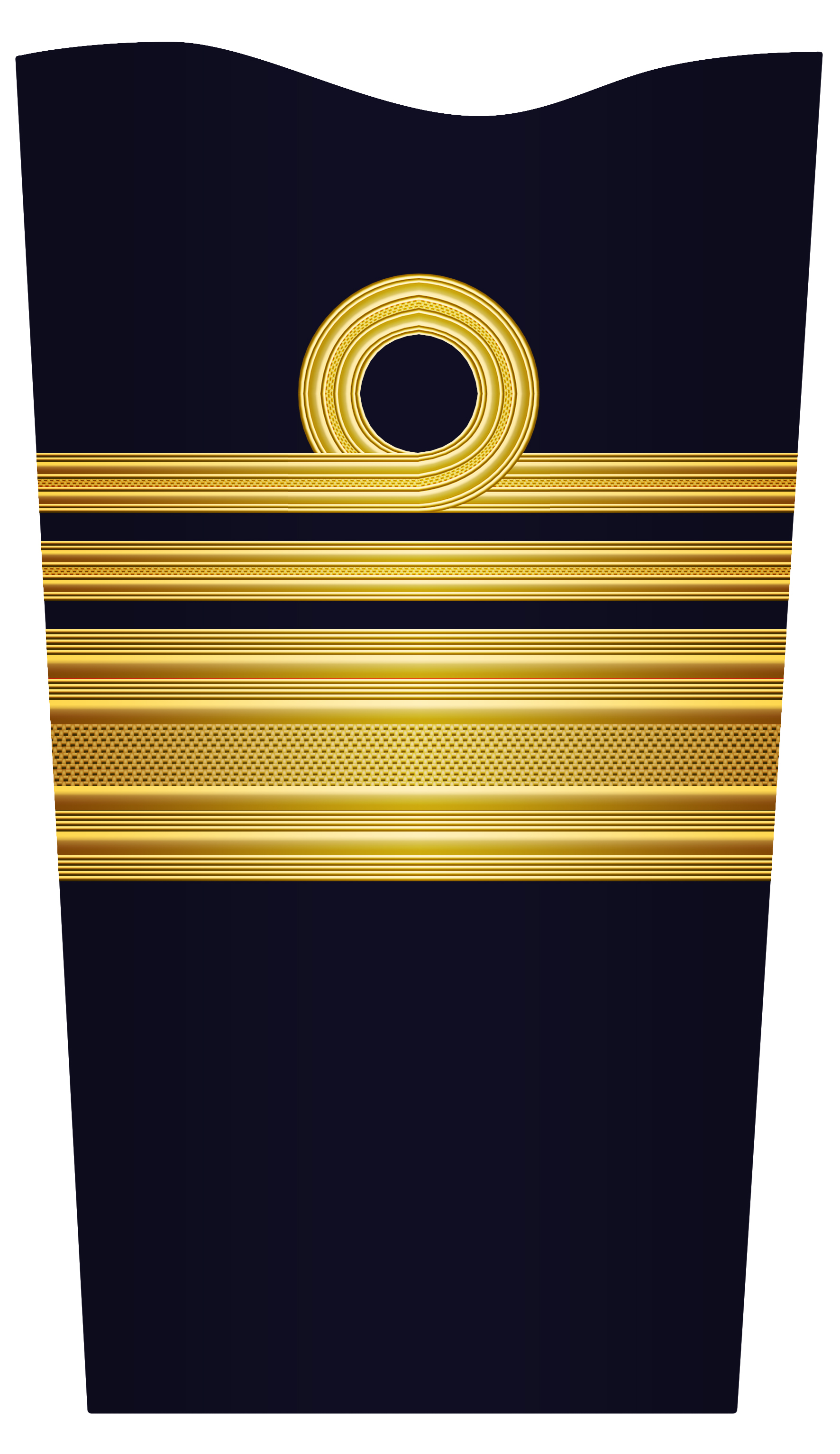
Insignia for Vice Admiral (OF-8) in the Swedish Navy.

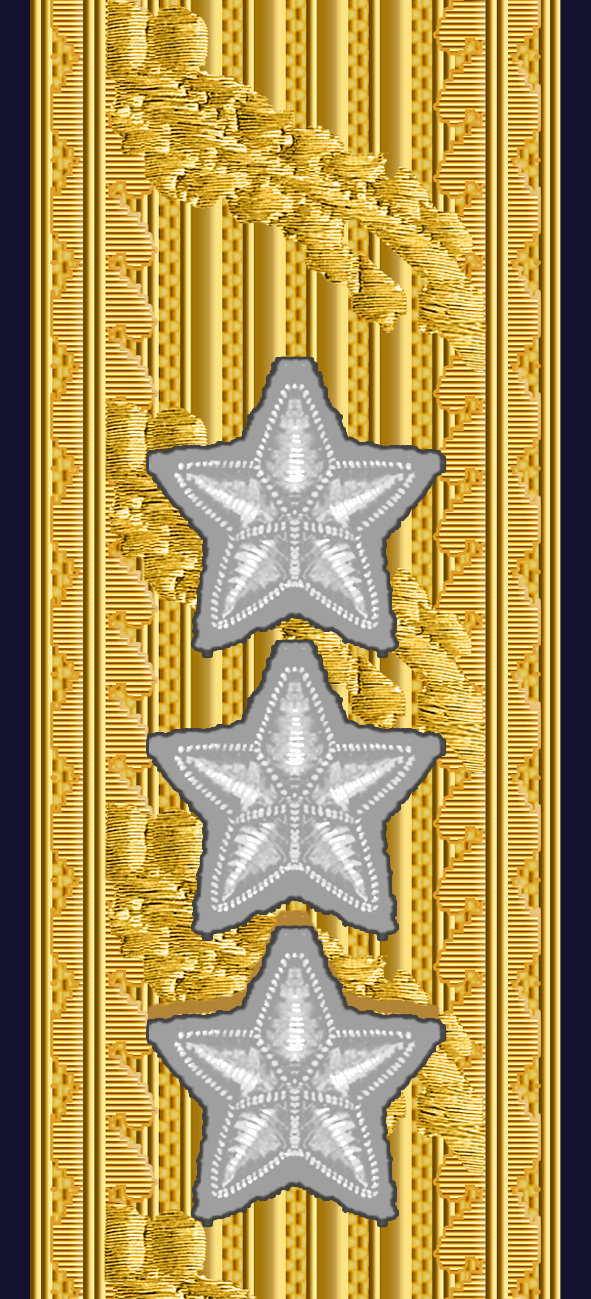
Shoulder mark of a Swedish three star admiral

Vice admiral flag

Vice admiral command flag 1875–1905

Vice admiral command flag 1815–1844

== Konteramiraler (Rear admirals) ==
1. Per Lilliehorn 1789
2. Carl Fredrik Eneskjöld 1793
3. Harald af Cristiernin 1795
4. Georg Christian de Frese 1797
5. Måns von Rosenstein 1797
6. Carl Adolph Danckwardt 1800
7. Claes Hjelmstjerna 1800
8. Carl Fredric Aschling 1808
9. Maurits Peter von Krusenstierna 1809
10. Hans Henrik Anckarheim 1812
11. Carl Edvard Carlheim-Gyllensköld 1814
12. Johan Herman Schützercrantz 1814
13. Carl af Klint 1823
14. Claes August Cronstedt 1823
15. Johan Gustaf von Sydow 1844
16. Carl Ulner 1852
17. Christian Adolf Virgin 1853
18. Salomon Mauritz von Krusenstierna 1861
19. Carl Henrik Kreüger 1881
20. Carl Magnus Ehnemark 1862
21. Baltzar von Platen 1862
22. Oscar Stackelberg 1886
23. Georg af Klercker 1892
24. Adolf Meister 1897
25. Fredrik Lennman 1899
26. Jacob Hägg 1899
27. Magnus Ingelman 1901
28. Otto Lindbom 1903
29. Theodor Sandström 1905
30. Arvid Lindman 1907
31. Sten Ankarcrona 1916
32. Gustaf af Klint 1918
33. Bernhard Juel 1919
34. Albert Fallenius 1923
35. Carl Sparre 1923
36. Hans Ericson 1928
37. Gunnar Unger 1931
38. Karl Wester 1931
39. Prince Wilhelm, Duke of Södermanland 1938
40. Helge Friis 1938
41. Nils Wijkmark 1938
42. Yngve Schoerner 1939
43. Marc Giron 1942
44. Yngve Ekstrand 1942
45. Erik Wetter 1943
46. Göran Wahlström 1943
47. Harald Qvistgaard 1945
48. Carl Ekman 1948
49. Gösta Odqvist 1948
50. Elis Biörklund 1949
51. Eskil Gester 1952
52. Ragnar Wetterblad 1953
53. Moje Östberg 1955
54. Einar Blidberg 1957
55. Gunnar Fogelberg 1959
56. Stig Bergelin 1963
57. Hans C:son Uggla 1964
58. Dag Arvas 1966
59. Nils-Erik Ödman 1968
60. Christer Kierkegaard 1970
61. Gunnar Grandin 1970
62. Rolf Rheborg 1973
63. Bengt Rasin 1977
64. Carl-Fredrik Algernon 1978
65. Jan Enquist 1982
66. Ola Backman 1982
67. Göran Wallén 1984
68. Claes Tornberg 1985
69. Torbjörn Hultman 1989
70. Cay Holmberg 1990
71. Sten Swedlund 1990
72. Torsten Lindh 1994
73. Bertil Björkman 1997
74. Göran Larsbrink 2001
75. Jörgen Ericsson 2001
76. Anders Grenstad 2005
77. Leif Nylander c. 2005
78. Stefan Engdahl 2006
79. Odd Werin 2010
80. Thomas Engevall 2014
81. Jens Nykvist 2016
82. Jonas Wikström 2021
83. Johan Norlén 2024
84. Bo Berg 2026

=== Insignias ===
Rear admiral

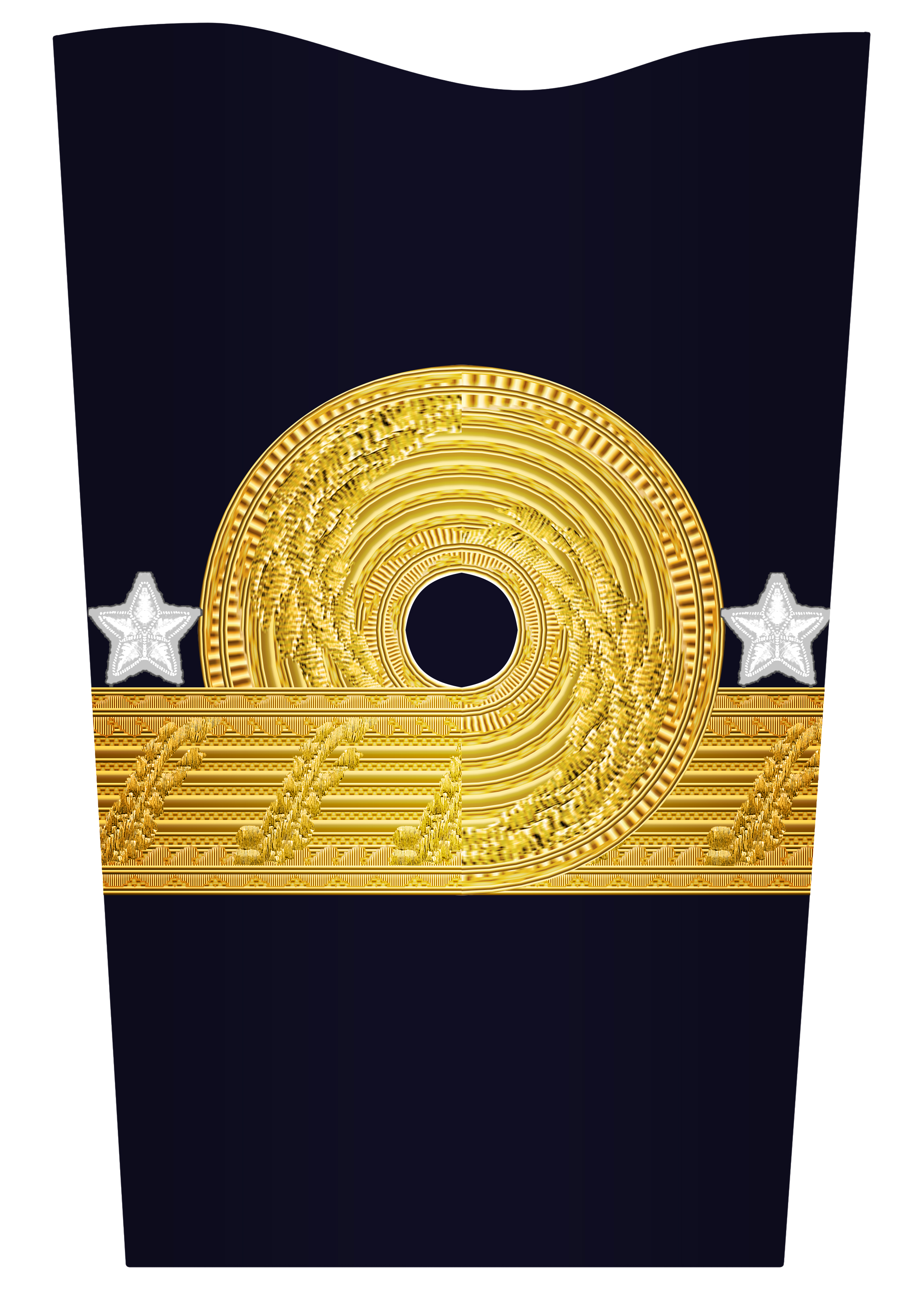
Pre-2003 sleeve insignia for a two star admiral

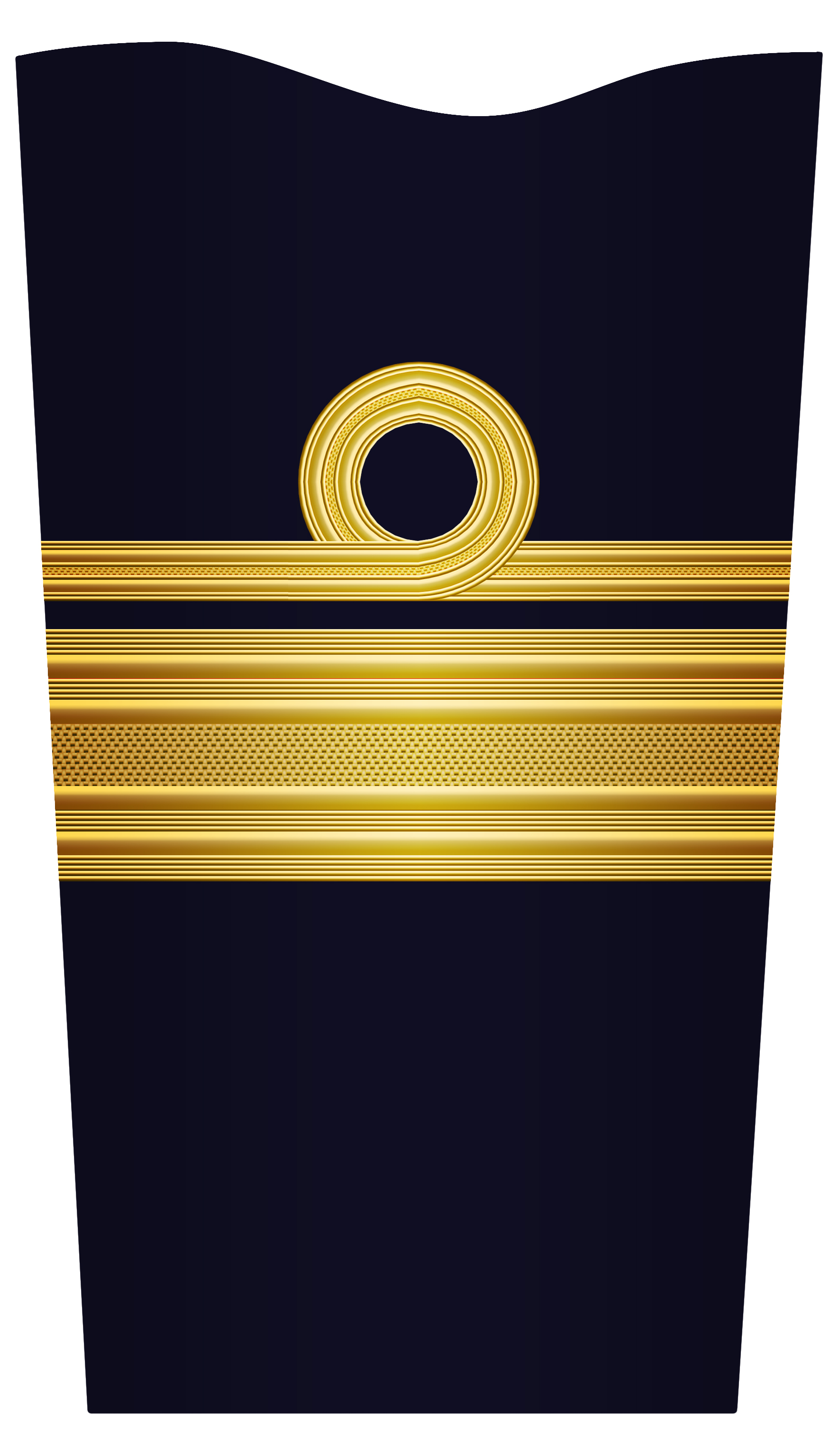
Insignia for Rear Admiral (OF-7) in the Swedish Navy.

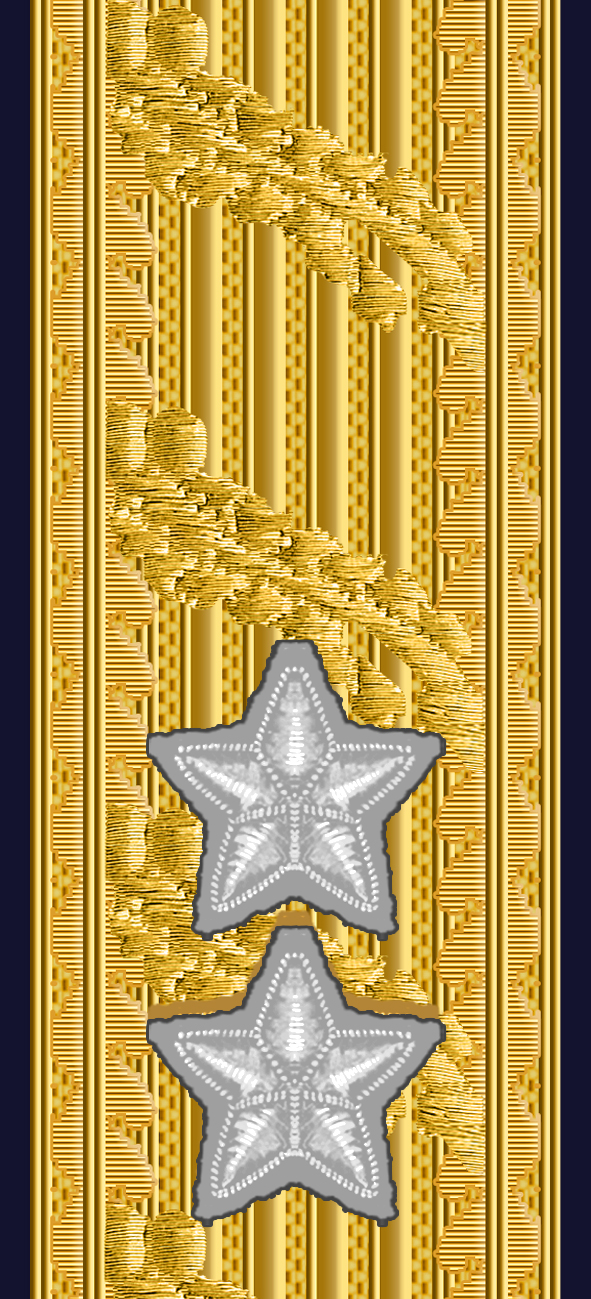
Shoulder mark of a Swedish two star admiral

Rear admiral flag

Rear admiral command flag 1875–1905

Rear admiral command flag 1815–1844

== Flottiljamiraler (Rear admiral (lower half)/Flotilla admiral) ==
1. Mats Fogelmark ?
2. Peter Bager ?
3. Andreas Olsson ?
4. Stefan Engdahl 2000
5. Bengt Johansson 2002
6. Lars Salomonsson 2003
7. Bengt Jarvid 2008
8. Anders Olovsson 2016
9. Bo Berg 2022
10. Fredrik Lindén 2023
11. Fredrik Peedu 2025
12. Jon Wikingsson 2026
13. Jonas Hård af Segerstad 2026

=== Insignias ===
Rear admiral (lower half)

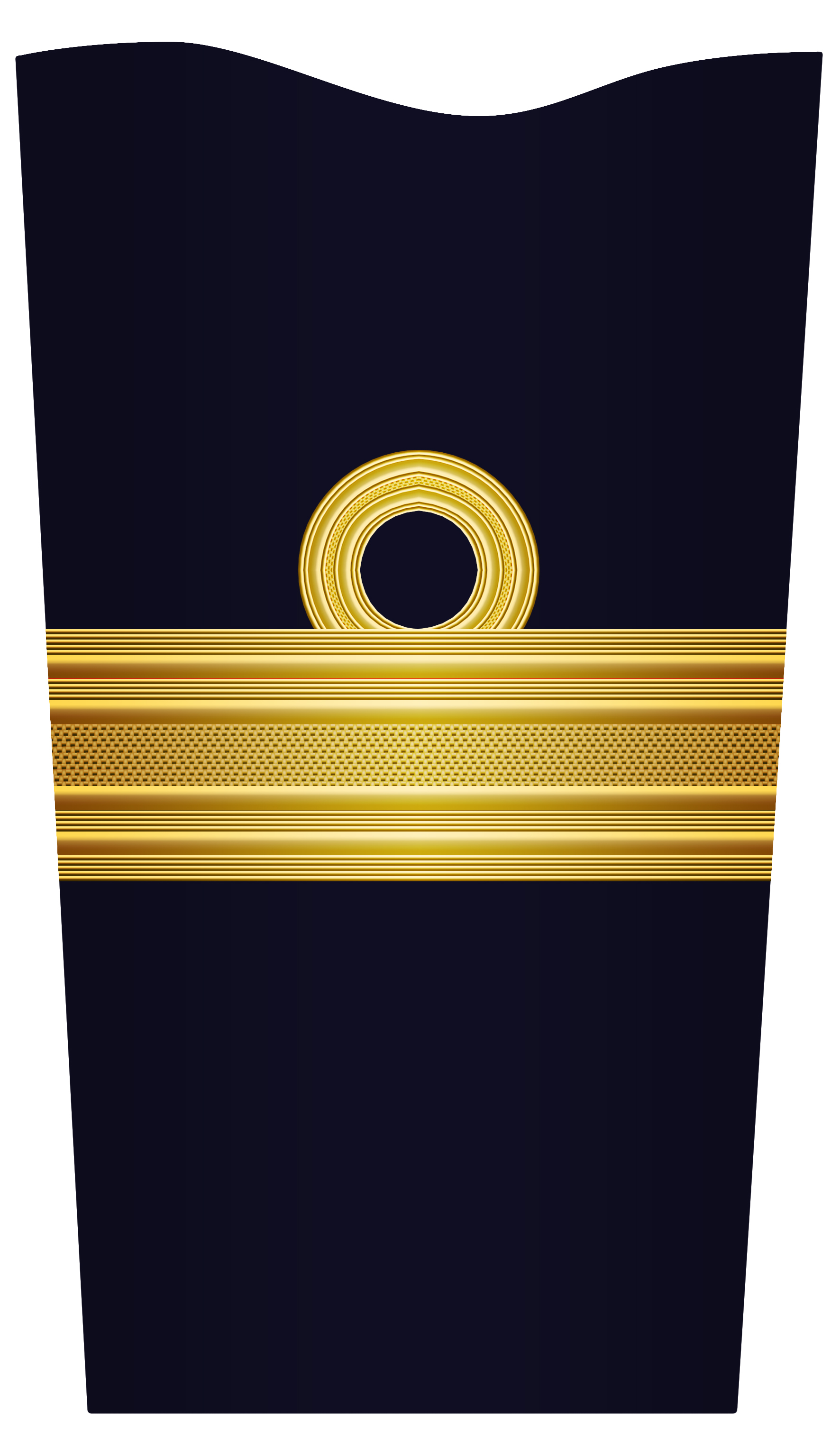
Insignia for Rear Admiral (OF-6) in the Swedish Navy.

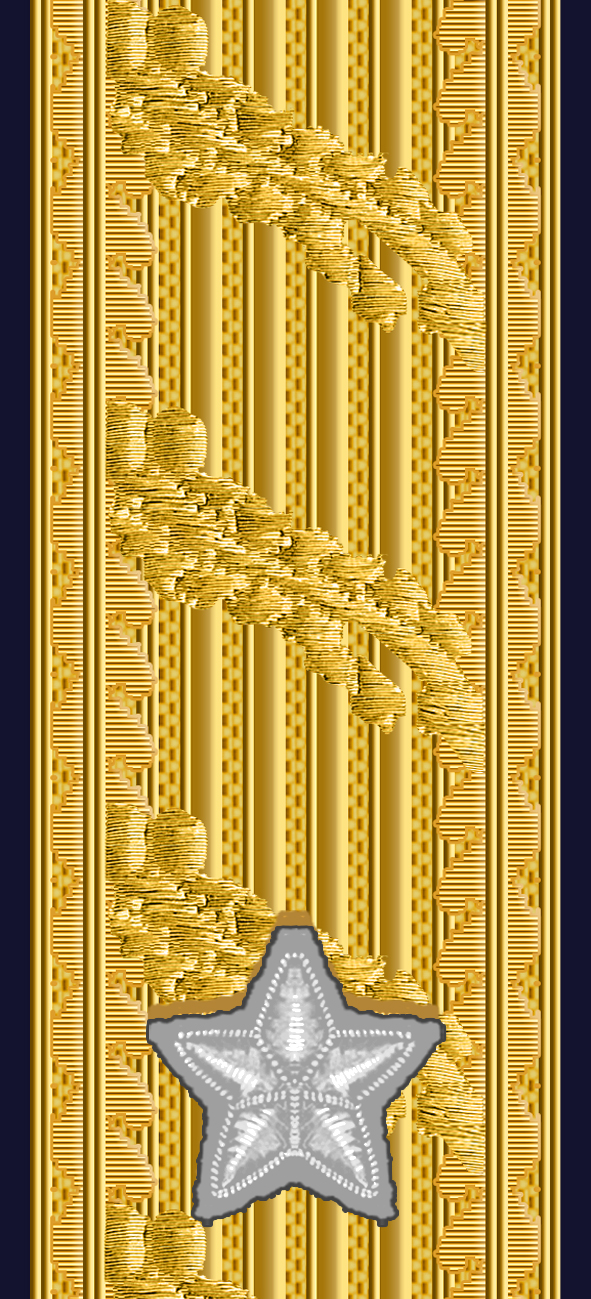
Shoulder mark of a Swedish one star admiral

Rear admiral (lower half) flag

== See also ==
- Lord High Admiral of Sweden
