= Bror Stefenson =

Swedish Navy officer

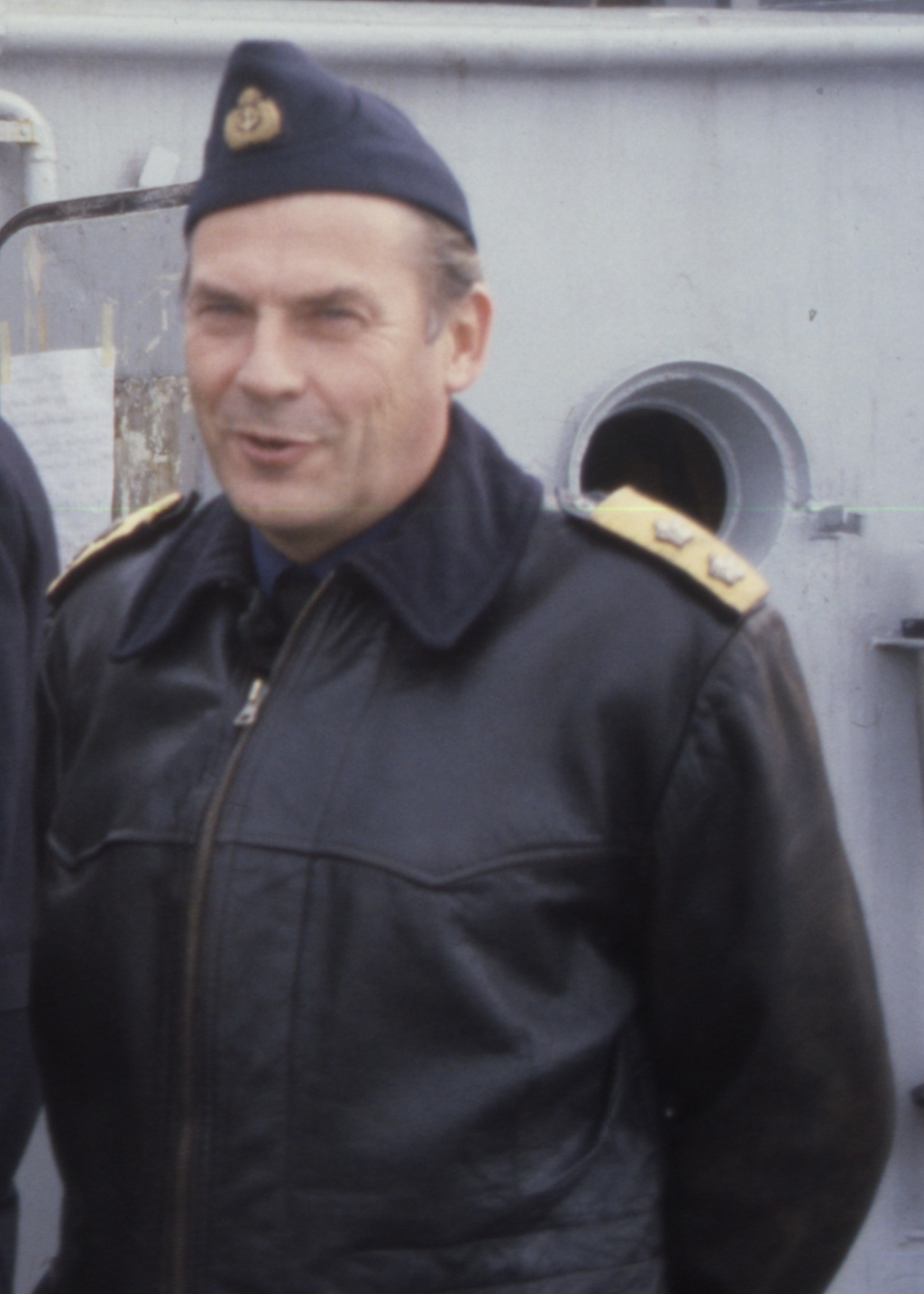
- Stefenson in 1982.
- Born: Bror Per Harald Stefenson; 4 September 1929; Stockholm, Sweden
- Died: 3 October 2018 (aged 89); Stockholm, Sweden
- Burial place: Galärvarvskyrkogården
- Relatives: Jens Stefenson (father)
- Military career
- Allegiance: Sweden
- Branch: Swedish Navy
- Service years: 1951–1991
- Rank: Admiral
- Commands: HSwMS Draken; 1st Submarine Flotilla; Coastal Fleet; Chief of the Defence Staff; Swedish National Defence College; Eastern Military District; Commandant General in Stockholm
- Conflicts: Hårsfjärden incident
- Other work: Chief of His Majesty's Military Staff

Admiral Bror Per Harald Stefenson (4 September 1929 – 3 October 2018) was a Swedish Navy officer. His senior commands include chief of the Defence Staff and military commander of the Eastern Military District (Milo Ö) as well as commandant general in Stockholm. He also served as chief of His Majesty's Military Staff. As of 2023, Stefenson remains the last appointed Swedish admiral (having been appointed in 1991).

== Early life ==
Stefenson was born on 4 September 1929 in Stockholm, the son of naval captain Jens Stefenson and his wife Astrid (née Grönberg). He passed studentexamen at Norra Real in Vasastan, Stockholm in 1948.

== Career ==
=== Military career ===
In 1951, Stefenson was commissioned as an officer with the rank of acting sub-lieutenant (fänrik). He was promoted two years later to sub-lieutenant (löjtnant) before attending the Royal Swedish Naval Academy from 1954 to 1959. Stefenson was the captain of the submarine HSwMS Draken in 1962 and in 1963, and was also promoted to lieutenant in 1963. He attended the Swedish Armed Forces Staff College in 1964. He was promoted to lieutenant commander in 1967 and to commander in 1970. He was promoted to captain in 1976 and was commanding officer of the 1st Submarine Flotilla from 1976 to 1978.

He was promoted to rear admiral in 1978, and was chief of staff of the Southern Military District (Milo S) from 1978 to 1979. Stefenson assumed the position of Commander-in-Chief of the Coastal Fleet on 1 October 1980. In 1982, he was promoted to vice admiral and appointed chief of the Defence Staff. He was at the same time the head of the Joint Operations (Operationsledningen, OPL) in the Defence Staff. Also in 1982, Stefenson was elected board member, by the Swedish government, of the East Economic Bureau, an agency which occupied a special position among the agencies engaged in the Swedish military intelligence.

Stefenson took office as chief of the Defence Staff on 1 October 1982, the same day the so-called Hårsfjärden incident occurred when a foreign submarine was trapped by the Swedish Navy and a reported 44 depth charges and four naval mines were detonated, trying to sink the submarine. It was later determined that it avoided the trap or fled at an early stage.

Stefenson later wrote Från periskop och brygga ("From periscope and bridge") with diary notes and memories from the submarine hunt on 1–10 October 1982. He has been criticized for hiding the truth behind the incident.

He left the posts in the Defense Staff in 1987 and became head of the Swedish National Defence College. A year later he was appointed military commander of the Eastern Military District (Milo Ö) and at the same time to the post of commandant general in Stockholm.

Stefenson retired in November 1991 and was promoted to full admiral. He was the last naval officer in Sweden to be promoted to admiral in connection with retirement. Only the Supreme Commander of the Swedish Armed Forces, if he came from the Navy, as well as the king, can today hold the rank of admiral.

=== Later career ===
Stefenson was chief of His Majesty's Military Staff from 1990 to 1997. From 1991 to 1994, he was also a project leader of Projekt Krishantering ("Project Crisis Management"). He was a special investigator regarding civilian use of defense resources from 1994 to 1995.

Stefenson was elected into the Royal Swedish Society of Naval Sciences in 1968 with number 908, and was its president from 1987 to 1992. He was a member of the Royal Swedish Academy of War Sciences since 1979. He has been inspector emeritus of the naval academy association SjöLund.

Stefenson was a politician in the Christian Democrats and a member of the Stockholm City Council (Stockholms stadsfullmäktige). He was chairman of the Christian Democratic Senior League from 2002 to 2007. He was also an honorary member of the Christian Democratic Senior League. Stefenson was chairman of the Hovförsamlingen ("Parish of the Royal Court") for 15 years. He was also on the board of the Fire Service and Rescue Board (Brand- och räddningsnämnden) and the Port of Stockholm Authority (Stockholms hamnstyrelse).

== Personal life ==
In 1953, Stefenson married the parish assistant Karin Östberg (born 1932), the daughter of consul Gustaf Östberg and Margit von Stedingk.

== Death ==
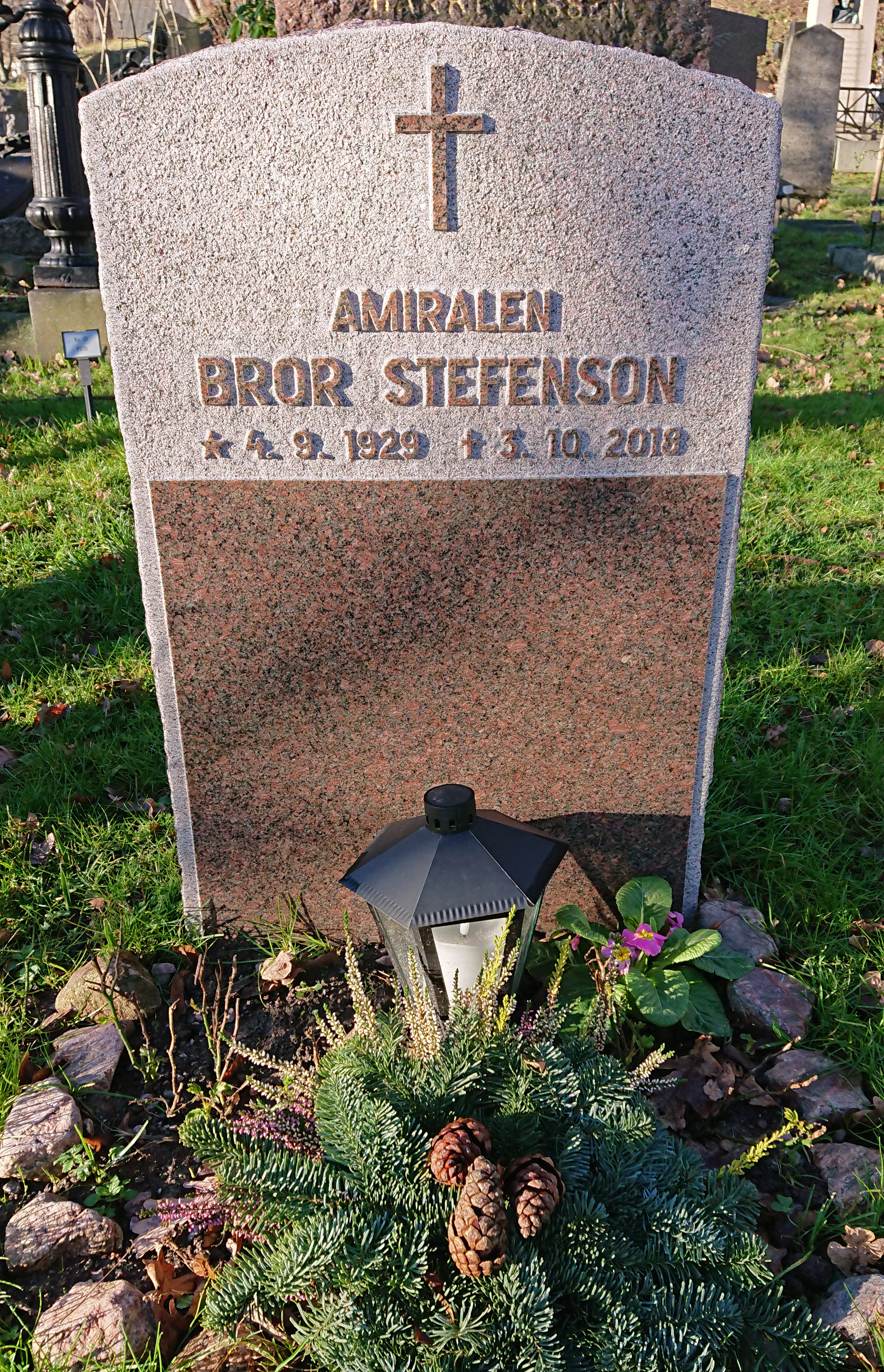
Gravestone at Galärvarvskyrkogården

Stefenson died on 3 October 2018 in his home at Slottsbacken 2 in Stockholm. The funeral service was held on 2 November 2018 in the Royal Chapel. He was interred at Galärvarvskyrkogården in Stockholm on 9 January 2019.

== Dates of rank ==
- 1951 – Acting sub-lieutenant
- 1953 – Sub-lieutenant
- 1963 – Lieutenant
- 1967 – Lieutenant commander
- 1970 – Commander
- 1976 – Captain
- 1978 – Rear admiral
- 1982 – Vice admiral
- November 1991 – Admiral

== Awards and decorations ==
- (Sweden) Knight of the Order of the Sword (6 June 1969)
- (Norway) Grand Cross of the Royal Norwegian Order of Merit (1 July 1992)
- (Portugal) Grand Cross of the Order of Prince Henry (15 May 1991)
- (Italy) 1st Class / Knight Grand Cross of the Order of Merit of the Italian Republic (8 April 1991)
- (Estonia) 1st Class of the Order of the White Star (8 September 1995)

== Bibliography ==
- Stefenson, Bror, ed. (1992). U 137-krisen (in Swedish). Stockholm: Kungl. Krigsvetenskapsakad. SELIBR 1593762.
- Stefenson, Bror, ed. (1993). Kan vi bli bättre? (in Swedish). Stockholm: Kungl. Krigsvetenskapsakad. SELIBR 1692293.
- Jonasson, Kjell A.; Sondén, Jan; Stefenson, Bror, eds. (1994). När krisen kommer: slutredovisning från Projekt Krishantering (in Swedish). Stockholm: Kungl. Krigsvetenskapsakad. SELIBR 8225438.
- Stefenson, Bror (2007). Från periskop och brygga: ubåtsman och amiral under kalla kriget minnesbilder från tiden 1948-1991 (in Swedish). Stockholm: Magnus Ullman. ISBN 978-91-633-1527-5. SELIBR 10618465.

Military offices
Preceded by Rolf Rheborg	Chief of Staff, Southern Military District; 1978–1979	Succeeded by Carl Björeman
Preceded by Bengt Rasin	Commander-in-Chief of the Coastal Fleet; 1980–1982	Succeeded by Jan Enquist
Preceded by Bengt Schuback	Chief of the Defence Staff; 1982–1987	Succeeded by Torsten Engberg
Preceded by Gustaf Welin	Swedish National Defence College; 1987–1988	Succeeded by Krister Larsson
Preceded by Bengt Lehander	Commanding Admiral, Eastern Military District; 1988–1991	Succeeded by None
Preceded by Bengt Lehander	Commandant General in Stockholm; 1988–1991	Succeeded by Torsten Engberg
Professional and academic associations
Preceded by Jan Enquist	Chairman of the Royal Swedish Society of Naval Sciences; 1987–1992	Succeeded by Claes Tornberg
Court offices
Preceded by Lennart Ljung	Chief of His Majesty's Military Staff; 1990–1997	Succeeded by Curt Sjöö
