= Jan Enquist =

Swedish Navy officer

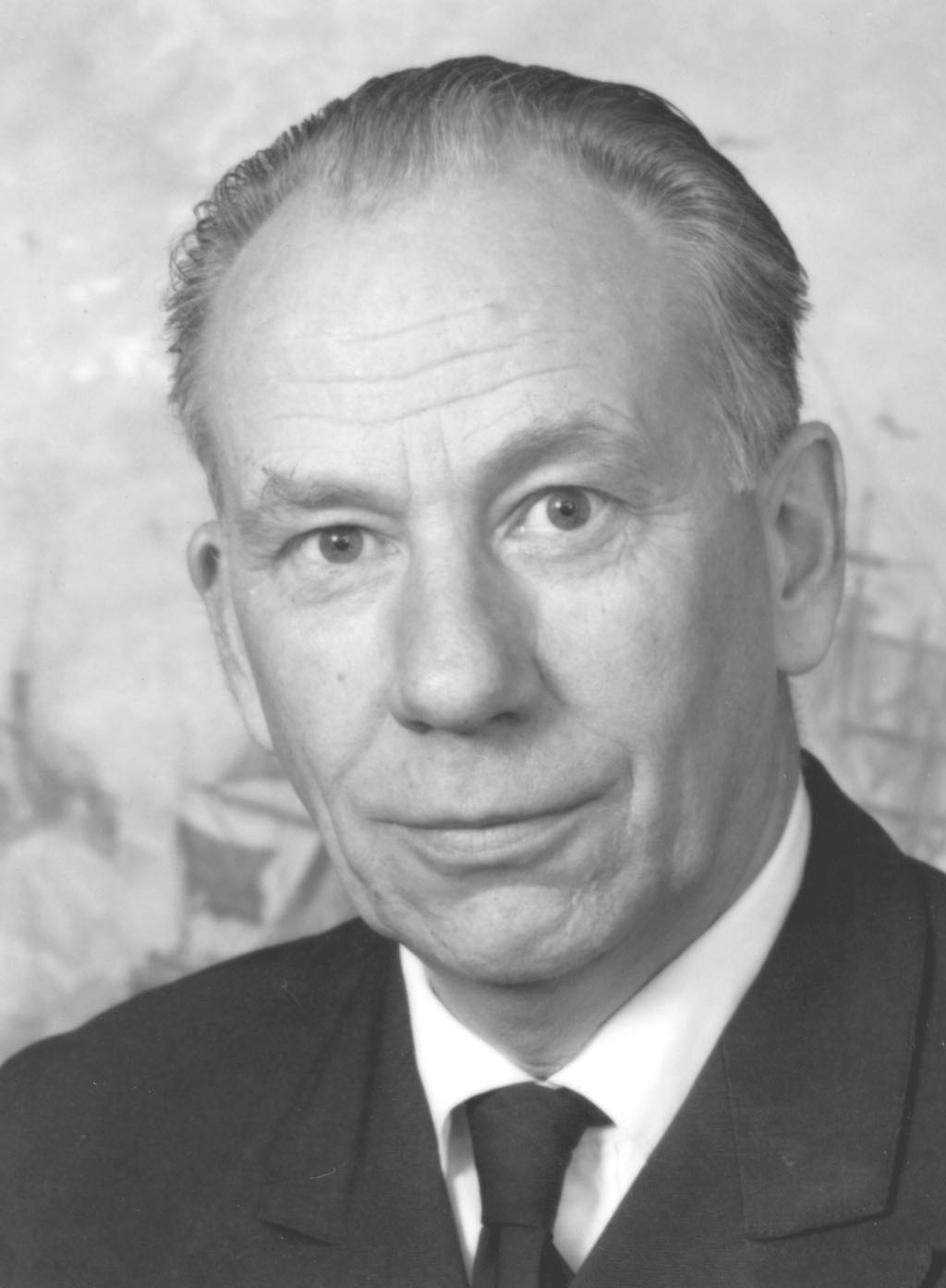
- Born: Jan Fredrik Enquist; 3 August 1925; Stockholm, Sweden
- Died: 21 August 2005 (aged 80)
- Burial place: Norra begravningsplatsen, Solna
- Military career
- Allegiance: Sweden
- Branch: Swedish Navy
- Service years: 1947–1989
- Rank: Rear Admiral
- Commands: HSwMS Munin; HSwMS Hälsingland; 1st Submarine Flotilla; Coastal Fleet; Western Military District

Rear Admiral Jan Fredrik Enquist (3 August 1925 – 21 August 2005) was a Swedish Navy officer. Enquist's senior commands include as Commander-in-Chief of the Coastal Fleet from 1982 to 1985 and as Commanding Admiral of the Western Military District from 1985 to 1989.

== Early life ==
Enquist was born on 3 August 1925 in Stockholm, Sweden, the son of professor Fredrik Enquist and his wife Greta (née Ekecrantz). He grew up in Uppsala and Gothenburg. After passing studentexamen from Vasa högre allmänna läroverk in Gothenburg in 1944, he was accepted as an officer candidate at the Royal Swedish Naval Academy in Stockholm.

== Career ==
Enquist was commissioned as a naval officer in the Swedish Navy with the rank of acting sub-lieutenant in 1947. He was promoted to sub-lieutenant in 1949 and was trained in the torpedo officer program and served during the subaltern years mainly on destroyers. He underwent a 1951-52 anti-submarine warfare course in England. Enquist attended the Royal Swedish Naval Staff College from 1954 to 1956. After completing the Royal Swedish Naval Staff College with a higher torpedo technical course in the mid-1950s, he served for a couple of years as adjutant to the Inspector of the Submarine Service, specializing in anti-submarine issues. He was promoted to lieutenant in 1959 and after serving on torpedo boats and destroyers, he was in 1962-1963 commander of HSwMS Munin and in 1963 commander of the destroyer HSwMS Hälsingland. He then began his specialization in planning and study activities serving at the Naval Staff's Planning Department from 1963 to 1965 and in the Defence Staff's Study Department - in the years 1967 to 1972 as head of the latter. It was there that the future development and preparedness of the defence was studied.

Enquist was promoted to lieutenant commander in 1965 and to commander in 1967. In the early 1970s, Enquist was involved in developing the Swedish defence's planning system. From 1 April 1972 he served in a submarine flotilla. Enquist was promoted to captain in 1973 and was appointed commander of the 1st Submarine Flotilla the same year, an appointment that was somewhat unexpected and unconventional, as he was not a trained submarine officer. He attended the Swedish National Defence College in 1975 and in 1977 and was promoted to senior captain in 1976. He was subsequently head of Section 1 in the Naval Staff. Enquist was appointed as head of the Naval Personnel Corps (Flottans personalkårer) from 1 October 1978 and as head of Section III in the Naval Staff. Much of his time was taken up by the major investigations, which aimed to give the Swedish Fleet a heightened level of constant readiness. They resulted in a major reorganization and reunification of the supply depot system, so that all ships could be kept materially ready for action.

On 1 October 1980, Enquist was appointed chief of staff in the Western Military District in Skövde. In 1982, he was promoted to rear admiral and was appointed Commander-in-Chief of the Coastal Fleet, serving in this position until 1985. The Coastal Fleet was one of the largest and most important units of the Swedish defence and the commandership one of the most prominent and responsible senior positions that an officer in the Swedish Navy could hold. The era was characterized not least by feared underwater violations of Swedish territorial waters, with accompanying extensive anti-submarine warfare activities. He was also tasked with carrying out the biggest change in training in the Swedish Fleet since the introduction of Conscription Training System 60 (VU 60) in 1966. It aimed to make the ships as quickly deployable as possible. On 1 October 1985, Enquist assumed the position of Commanding Admiral of the Western Military District, succeeding rear admiral Bengt Rasin. Enquist retired on 1 October 1989 and was succeeded by Major General Bertel Österdahl.

In addition to his military career, Enquist was a military expert at the 1970 Defence Investigation as well as a member of the delegation for the coordination of marine resource activities from 1979 to 1984.

== Personal life ==
In 1951, Enquist married Ann-Margret Sohlman (born 1929), the daughter of managing director Sverre Rson Sohlman and Marianne (née Åkerhielm). Enquist had four children: Gunilla, Anna, Claes and Patrik.

The Enquist family lived on the Torsberg farm in Töreboda Municipality.

== Death ==
Enquist died on 21 August 2005. He was interred on 24 October 2005 at Norra begravningsplatsen in Solna Municipality.

== Dates of rank ==
- 1947 – Acting sub-lieutenant
- 1949 – Sub-lieutenant
- 1959 – Lieutenant
- 1965 – Lieutenant commander
- 1967 – Commander
- 1973 – Captain
- 1976 – Senior captain
- 1982 – Rear admiral

== Honours ==
- Member of the Royal Swedish Society of Naval Sciences (1966; honorary member 1987)
- Chairman of the Royal Swedish Society of Naval Sciences (1983–1986)
- Member of the Royal Swedish Academy of War Sciences (1981)

Military offices
Preceded by Gustaf Welin	Chief of Staf, Western Military District; 1980–1982	Succeeded by Torsten Engberg
Preceded by Bror Stefenson	Commander-in-Chief of the Coastal Fleet; 1982–1985	Succeeded by Claes Tornberg
Preceded by Bengt Rasin	Commanding Admiral, Western Military District; 1985–1989	Succeeded by Bertel Österdahl
Professional and academic associations
Preceded by Bengt Rasin	Chairman of the Royal Swedish Society of Naval Sciences; 1983–1986	Succeeded by Bror Stefenson
