= Sten Swedlund =

Swedish Navy officer

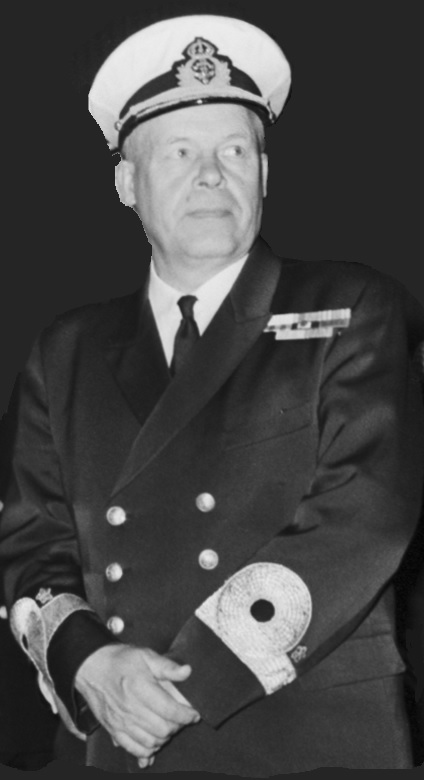
- Rear admiral Sten Swedlund in 1994.
- Born: Sten Gustaf Ivar Swedlund; 13 March 1937; Uppsala, Sweden
- Died: 14 July 2014 (aged 77); Karlskrona, Sweden
- Relatives: Nils Swedlund (uncle)
- Military career
- Allegiance: Sweden
- Branch: Swedish Navy
- Service years: 1961–1994
- Rank: Rear Admiral
- Commands: HSwMS Gripen; 1st Submarine Flotilla; South Coast Naval Base; Coastal Fleet

Rear Admiral Sten Gustaf Ivar Swedlund (13 March 1937 – 14 July 2014) was a Swedish Navy officer. Swedlund's senior commands include as commander of the South Coast Naval Base from 1987 to 1990 and Commander-in-Chief of the Coastal Fleet from 1990 to 1994. After retiring from the military, Swedlund became involved in the Red Cross's international aid activities in Yugoslavia, North Korea and Iraq during the Iraq War.

== Early life ==
Swedlund was born on 13 March 1937 in Uppsala Parish in Uppsala Municipality, Sweden, the son of Robert Swedlund, an archivist, and his wife Ingrid (née Tobé). His uncle was General Nils Swedlund, the Supreme Commander of the Swedish Armed Forces from 1951 to 1961. Sten Swedlund passed studentexamen in Gothenburg in 1956 and was accepted in 1958 as an officer candidate at the Royal Swedish Naval Academy in Stockholm. As an officer candidate at the Naval Academy, he took part in HSwMS Älvsnabben's voyage which that year went to the West Indies, Costa Rica, Mexico and the west Coast of the United States through the Panama Canal and Canada.

== Career ==
Swedlund graduated from the Royal Swedish Naval Academy in 1961 and was commissioned as an officer the same year. At the academy, Swedlund attended the same class as the future Chief of the Navy, Vice Admiral Dick Börjesson. Swedlund was appointed orderly officer for Crown Prince Carl Gustaf and was course director when the Crown Prince did his military service at the Royal Swedish Naval Academy and aboard HSwMS Älvsnabben. Afterwards, Swedlund became ADC to the Crown Prince in 1968. Swedlund was promoted to lieutenant in 1969 and served as commanding officer of the submarine HSwMS Gripen from 1968 to 1969. Swedlund attended the staff course at the Swedish Armed Forces Staff College from 1970 to 1972 when he was promoted to lieutenant commander. Swedlund was promoted to commander on 1 February 1975, and attended the Naval War College in the United States from 1978 to 1979.

Swedlund then served as head of the Organization Department in the Naval Staff from 1980 to 1983. He was promoted to captain in 1983 and appointed commanding officer of the 1st Submarine Flotilla. Swedlund was appointed commanding officer of the South Coast Naval Base and promoted to senior captain on 1 October 1987. He was promoted to rear admiral in 1990 and appointed Commander-in-Chief of the Coastal Fleet. He served in this position until 1994 when he retired. SwedIund, before a temporally normal replacement as Commander-in-Chief of the Coastal Fleet, had been offered other tasks within the Swedish Armed Forces, but declined. Swedlund went on to work in the Swedish defense industry through employment at SAAB Missiles.

Swedlund served as aide-de-camp to His Royal Highness Crown Prince Carl Gustaf's staff from 1968 and in His Majesty the King Carl XVI Gustaf's staff after he ascended the throne in 1973. Swedlund served as chief aide-de-camp (överadjutant) to His Majesty the King Carl XVI Gustaf from 1983 to 1996. During his military career, Swedlund also served as vice chairman of the Royal Swedish Society of Naval Sciences from 1987 to 1994 and sat on the board of the National Swedish Museums of Military History (Statens försvarshistoriska museer, SFHM) from 1988 to 1994.

== Later life ==
After his retirement in 1994, Swedlund became involved in the international relief work of the Red Cross, stationed in Zagreb, Croatia from 1995 to 1997, in North Korea from 1997 to 1998 and then in Serbia, Montenegro and Kosovo. Swedlund also participated in the Red Cross actions in connection with the Iraq War in 2003. For his international humanitarian efforts, he received the Prince Carl Medal in 2009. Swedlund also got involved in his hometown of Karlskrona and played an important role in the demilitarization of Stumholmen and the location of the Naval Museum there. He was also a driving force in the Varvshistoriska föreningen ("Ship History Association") work to revive the Ropewalk at Lindholmen, built in the 1690s.

Swedlund was also the 7th Inspectore Emeriti of the SjöLund naval academic association.

== Personal life ==
In 1962, Swedlund married Ingrid Lindén (born 1940), the daughter of Anders Lindén and Kerstin (née Markfors). They had two children.

== Death ==
Swedlund died in a traffic accident on 14 July 2014 in Karlskrona. He was driving his car when, near the Admiralty Park, he suddenly crossed over to the wrong side of the road, according to the emergency services, probably because he passed out. Swedlund collided head-on with a wheel loader. Despite the fact that the driver of the wheel loader started cardiopulmonary resuscitation together with two witnesses, his life could not be saved.

== Dates of rank ==
- 1961 – Acting sub-lieutenant
- 19?? – Sub-lieutenant
- 1969 – Lieutenant
- 1972 – Lieutenant commander
- 1 February 1975 – Commander
- 1983 – Captain
- 1987 – Senior captain
- 1990 – Rear admiral

== Awards and decorations ==
- (Sweden) Prince Carl Medal (2009)

== Honours ==
- Member of the Royal Swedish Society of Naval Sciences (1980)
- Member of the Royal Swedish Academy of War Sciences (1993)

Military offices
Preceded by Roderick Klintebo	1st Submarine Flotilla; 1983–1987	Succeeded by ?
Preceded by Lennart Jedeur-Palmgren	South Coast Naval Base; 1987–1990	Succeeded by Stefan Furenius
Preceded by Claes Tornberg	Commander-in-Chief of the Coastal Fleet; 1990–1994	Succeeded by Frank Rosenius
