= Bengt Rasin =

Swedish Navy officer

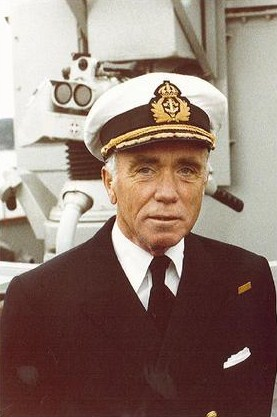
- Born: Bengt Göran Larsson; 17 April 1922; Gothenburg, Sweden
- Died: 2 January 2013 (aged 90); Gothenburg, Sweden
- Military career
- Allegiance: Sweden
- Branch: Swedish Navy
- Service years: 1944–1985
- Rank: Rear Admiral
- Commands: HSwMS U2; HSwMS Sjöborren; HSwMS Svärdfisken; HSwMS U3; 1st Submarine Flotilla; Coastal Fleet; West Coast Military Command; Gothenburg and Bohus Defence District; Western Military District

Rear Admiral Bengt Göran Rasin, né Larsson (17 April 1922 – 2 January 2013) was a Swedish Navy officer. His senior commands include Commander-in-Chief of the Coastal Fleet, commanding officer of the West Coast Military Command and commanding officer of the Western Military District. Rasin also served as chairman of the Royal Swedish Society of Naval Sciences.

== Early life ==
Rasin was born Bengt Göran Larsson on 17 April 1922 in Annedal Parish, Gothenburg, Sweden, the son of chief physician Hjalmar Larsson and his wife Elsa (née Rasin). Both parents were employed at Gothenburg schools and were anxious that their son would receive a good education as a basis for the future. He passed studentexamen at the Vasa högre allmänna läroverk in 1941 and after mandatory military service became an officer candidate in the Swedish Navy on the 20 June the same year with number 6. At this time - with the threat of war and a navy in strong development - a couple of hundred young people applied for the Royal Swedish Naval Academy which only accepted 75 people. Rasin was accepted as number 2. Rasin graduated as an acting sub-lieutenant and was commissioned into the navy as number 4 of the 39 remaining sea cadets in the fall of 1944.

== Career ==
During his time at the Royal Swedish Naval Academy, Rasin was trained in seamanship aboard the armored cruiser HSwMS Fylgia. In October 1944 he embarked on the submarine HSwMS Svärdfisken - a service that at that time entailed considerable risks. Rasin then attended submarine school. The best acting sub-lieutenants in each course also got to make long journeys, whereby Rasin temporarily had to stop his submarine service for a trip with the cruiser HSwMS Gotland to Rio de Janeiro. Rasin's talent was also used in a training course in the Royal Navy in 1948, to bring home the new radar technology.

Rasin served as captain of the submarines HSwMS U2 (1946), HSwMS Sjöborren (1953–54 and 1957) and HSwMS Svärdfisken (1954). He was trained in submarine and staff service and attended the staff course at the Royal Swedish Naval Staff College from 1951 to 1953. Rasin attended the Royal Naval College, Greenwich in the United Kingdom in 1961 and he served as captain of the submarine HSwMS U3 in 1962. Rasin underwent the general course at the Swedish National Defence College in 1966. He served as chief of Section 1 from 1966 and chief of staff of the Western Military District (Milo V) and was commanding officer of the 1st Submarine Flotilla from 1971 to 1972.

In 1973, Rasin took a management course and in 1977 he was promoted to rear admiral and was appointed Commander-in-Chief of the Coastal Fleet. On 1 October 1980, Rasin assumed the position of commander of the West Coast Naval Base in Gothenburg which in 1981 became the West Coast Military Command and Älvsborg Coastal Artillery Regiment. He then served as the Commanding Admiral of the Western Military District from 1983 to 1985.

== Other work ==
Rasin was elected in 1961, with number 851, into the Royal Swedish Society of Naval Sciences. He was its chairman from 1979 to 1984. In 1978, Rasin became a member of the Royal Swedish Academy of War Sciences, Section II, Naval Studies. He was also Inspektor of the naval academies associations UppSjö and SjöBorg from 1978 to 1982. Rasin's great interest in sailing made, among other things, that he was chairman of the organizing committee for the Tall Ships' Races in 1986, when Gothenburg for the first time constituted final destination.

== Personal life ==
On 16 November 1947, Rasin married Gunnel Björklund (1922–2011), the daughter of Ernst Björklund and Edith (née Uhlén). They had two sons; Bengt and Lars.

== Death ==
Rasin died on 2 January 2013 in Vasa Parish, Gothenburg. The funeral service was held on 8 February 2013 in Saint Birgitta's chapel in Gothenburg. He is buried at Nya Varvet Cemetery in Gothenburg.

== Dates of rank ==
- 1944 – Acting sub-lieutenant
- 1946 – Sub-lieutenant
- 1954 – Lieutenant
- 1962 – Lieutenant commander
- 1963 – Commander
- 1970 – Captain
- 1973 – Senior captain
- 1977 – Rear admiral

== Awards and decorations ==
- (Sweden) Knight of the Order of the Sword (1963)

== Honours ==
- Member of the Royal Swedish Academy of War Sciences (1978)
- Honorary member of the Royal Swedish Society of Naval Sciences (chairman 1978–1983)

Military offices
Preceded by Bengt Liljestrand	Chief of Staff of the Western Military District; 1973–1977	Succeeded by Robert Lugn
Preceded by Christer Kierkegaard	Commander-in-Chief of the Coastal Fleet; 1977–1980	Succeeded by Bror Stefenson
Preceded by Hans Hallerdt	West Coast Military Command; 1981–1983	Succeeded by Thorbjörn Ottosson
Preceded by Kjell Nordström	Western Military District; 1983–1985	Succeeded by Jan Enquist
Professional and academic associations
Preceded by Bengt Lundvall	Chairman of the Royal Swedish Society of Naval Sciences; 1978–1983	Succeeded by Jan Enquist
