= Jens Stefenson =

Swedish naval officer and diver (1895–1986)

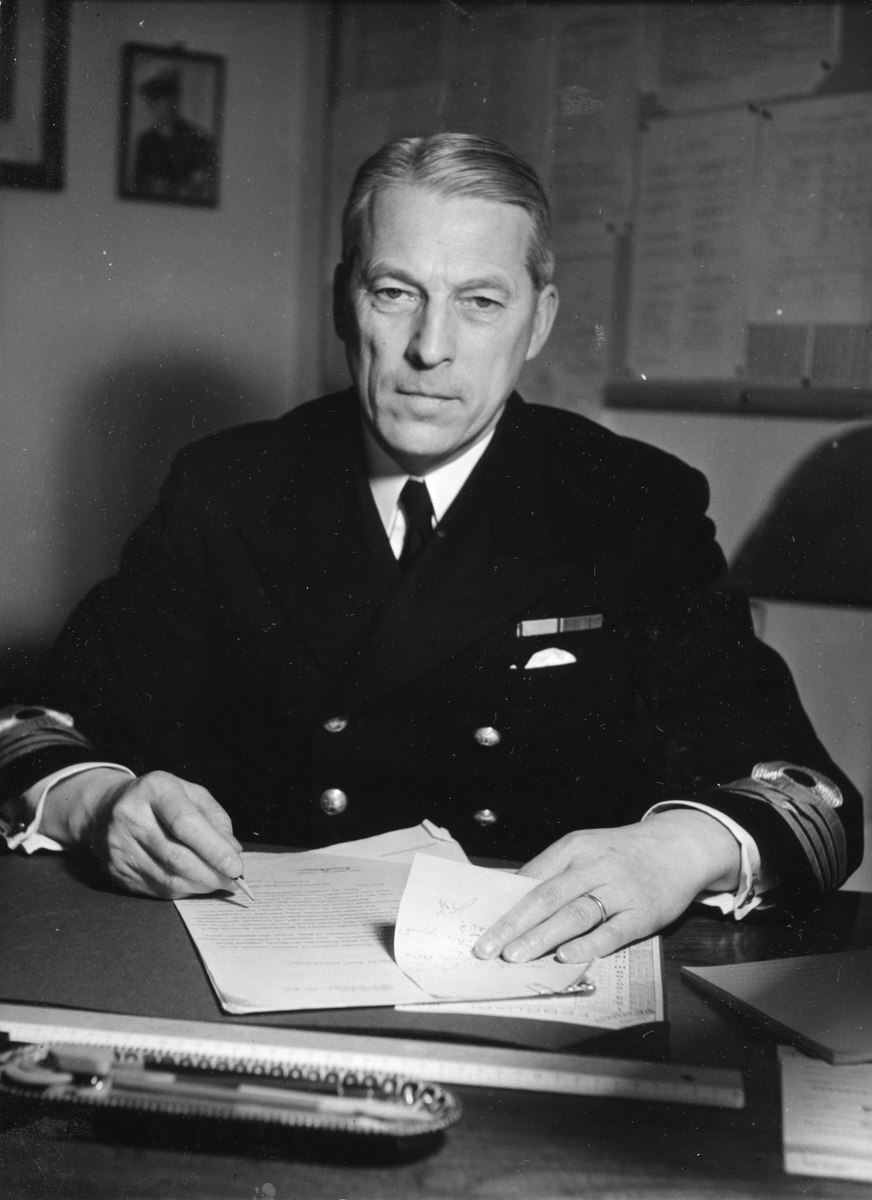
- Captain Stefenson as head of the Royal Swedish Naval Academy.
- Born: Jens Harald Stefenson; 1 February 1895; Örebro, Sweden
- Died: 1 March 1986 (aged 91); Täby, Sweden
- Burial place: Galärvarvskyrkogården, Stockholm
- Children: 3, including Bror Stefenson
- Military career
- Branch: Swedish Navy
- Service years: 1916–1955
- Rank: Captain
- Commands: Royal Naval Academy (1943–49); Karlskrona Naval Station (1949–55)

Captain Jens Harald Stefenson (1 February 1895 – 1 March 1986) was a Swedish Navy officer and diver who competed in the 1912 Summer Olympics.

== Early life ==
Stefenson was born on 1 February 1895 in Örebro, Sweden, the son of Per Karlsson, a master builder, and his wife Vilhelmina (née Larsson). At the 1912 Olympic Games he was eliminated in the first round of the 10 metre platform competition as well as in the plain high diving event. Stefenson then passed studentexamen in 1913.

== Career ==
Stefenson attended the Royal Swedish Naval Academy from 1913 to 1916 and the Royal Swedish Naval Staff College in 1922. Stefenson became a navigation teacher in 1924 and was commissioned as a naval officer in the Swedish Navy in 1916 with the rank of acting sub-lieutenant. He was promoted to sub-lieutenant in 1918, lieutenant in 1929, commander of the second rank in 1939, of the first rank in 1942, and to captain in 1944.

During postings on cadet ships, he participated in several trips to the Mediterranean, South America, and countries in Northern and Western Europe. He held postings as a cadet officer and navigation officer in a dozen naval expeditions from 1922 to 1932, as commander on torpedo boats and destroyers, as well as head of the department of the School of Naval Warfare Department (Sjökrigsskoleavdelningen).

Stefenson was a cadet officer from 1922 and adjutant and teacher at the Royal Swedish Naval Academy from 1926 to 1932. He was a teacher at the Non-Commissioned Officer's School (Underofficersskolan) from 1932 to 1935, company commander from 1936 to 1937, and head of department in the Naval Staff from 1940 to 1942. He became vice chairman of the Officers Association (Officersförbundet) in 1944. Stefenson was head of the Royal Swedish Naval Academy from 1943 to 1949 and was the commander of the Karlskrona Naval Station from 1949 to 1955 when he retired from active service.

== Personal life ==
In 1919, Stefenson married Astrid Marianne Grönberg (1898–1977), daughter of the CEO Artur Grönberg and Adéle Strömberg. He was the father of Bengt (1920–2005), Jan (1924–2015), and Bror (1929–2018).

== Death ==
Stefenson died on 1 March 1986 in Täby. He was interred on 28 May 1986 at Galärvarvskyrkogården in Stockholm.

== Dates of rank ==
- 1916 – Acting sub-lieutenant
- 1918 – Sub-lieutenant
- 1929 – Lieutenant
- 1939 – Lieutenant commander
- 1942 – Commander
- 1944 – Captain

== Awards and decorations ==
=== Swedish ===
- (Sweden) Commander 1st Class of the Order of the Sword (6 June 1951)
- (Sweden) Knight of the Order of the Polar Star
- (Sweden) Knight of the Order of Vasa
- (Sweden) Swedish Auxiliary Naval Corps' gold medal (Sjövärnskårens guldmedalj)
- (Sweden) National Association for the Aquatic Promotion's silver medal (Riksföreningen för simningens främjandes silvermedalj)

=== Foreign ===
- (Denmark) Commander 1st Class of the Order of the Dannebrog
- (Norway) Commander of the Order of St. Olav (1 July 1948)
- (France) Knight of the Ordre du Mérite Maritime
- (Iceland) Knight's Cross of the Order of the Falcon (26 June 1930)

== Honours ==
- Member of the Royal Swedish Society of Naval Sciences (1933)
- Member of the Royal Swedish Academy of War Sciences (1947)

Military offices
Preceded by Erik Samuelson	Royal Swedish Naval Academy; 1943–1949	Succeeded by Gustaf Sebastian Tamm
Preceded by Åke Grefberg	Karlskrona Naval Station; 1949–1955	Succeeded by ?
