= Prince Carl Medal =

Prince Carl Medal Prins Carl-medaljen
- The Prince Carl Medal
- Type: Royal medal
- Awarded for: Humanitarian activity
- Country: Sweden
- Presented by: The King of Sweden
- Status: Currently awarded
- Established: 1945

Order of Wear
- Next (higher): Prince Eugen Medal
- Next (lower): Royal Jubilee Commemorative Medals

The Prince Carl Medal (Swedish: Prins Carl-medaljen) is a royal medal of Sweden. The medal was instituted by Gustaf V of Sweden in 1945 on the retirement of Prince Carl, Duke of Västergötland as chairman of the Red Cross of Sweden. The medal is awarded for national or international humanitarian activity.

== Recipients ==
The following is a partial list of recipients:

- Princess Christina, member of the Swedish Royal Family and former chairman of the Red Cross of Sweden
- Sture Linnér, retired diplomat and Greek cultural expert
- Markku Niskala, Secretary General of the Red Cross of Sweden
- Pope Pius XII
- Eleanor Roosevelt, American politician, diplomat, First Lady, and activist.
- Johan von Schreeb, surgeon and Associate Professor at the Center for Disaster Medicine at the Karolinska Institutet
- Albert Schweitzer
- Sten Swedlund, rear admiral
