= Christer Kierkegaard =

Swedish Navy officer

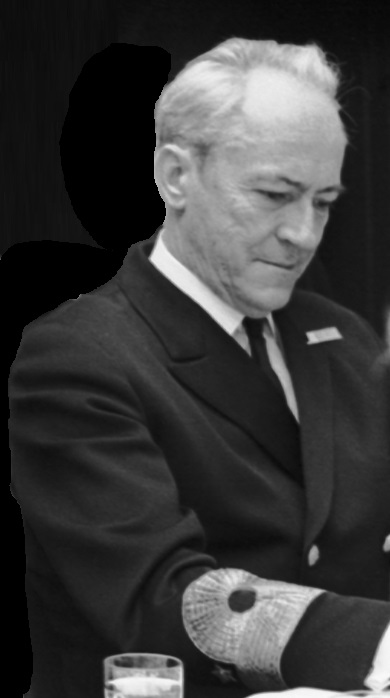
- Kierkegaard in 1975.
- Born: Sören Christer Douglas Kierkegaard; 17 July 1918; Lillkyrka, Örebro, Sweden
- Died: 24 December 1999 (aged 81); Råsunda, Solna, Sweden
- Military career
- Allegiance: Sweden
- Branch: Swedish Navy
- Service years: 1939–1983
- Rank: Rear Admiral
- Commands: HSwMS Ulvön; HSwMS Visby; HSwMS Halland; HSwMS Småland; 1st Destroyer Flotilla; Coastal Fleet; East Coast Naval Base
- Conflicts: Hårsfjärden incident

Rear Admiral Sören Christer Douglas Kierkegaard (17 July 1918 – 24 December 1999) was a Swedish Navy officer. Swedlund's senior commands include as Commander-in-Chief of the Coastal Fleet from 1970 to 1977 and commander of the East Coast Naval Base from 1977 to 1983.

== Early life ==
Kierkegaard was born on 17 July 1918 at the Ekeberg estate in Lillkyrka Parish in Örebro Municipality, Sweden, the son of Nils Kierkegaard (1875–1962) and his wife Ingegerd (née Swensson). He had several siblings and half-siblings, including banker Christian Kierkegaard (1925–2003) and the professor of structural chemistry at Stockholm University Peder Kierkegaard (1928–1996). The Kierkegaard family originates from Horsens in Denmark. Kierkegaard's ancestor, Niels Christian Kierkegaard, was born in 1817, he traveled to Sweden in 1839 and became a shipbuilder there. He died in Gothenburg in 1869. From him descends the great Swedish family of landowners at Ekeberg estate.

Christer Kierkegaard passed studentexamen in Örebro in 1936 and began his military service as a cadet at the Royal Swedish Naval Academy in Stockholm. A few days after the outbreak of World War II, he graduated as an acting sub-lieutenant and was commissioned as an officer in the Swedish Navy.

== Career ==
During the first years, Kierkegaard devoted himself to flight service at the naval reconnaissance Roslagen Air Corps (F 2) in Hägernäs, Östgöta Wing (F 3) in Malmslätt and Södermanland Wing (F 11) in Nyköping. His specialty was aerial reconnaissance, and he also served for a time as a reconnaissance pilot on the aircraft cruiser HSwMS Gotland. During his service at Malmslätt, he made two visits to Milan, Italy to take part in the repatriation of the Italian twin-engine bomber and reconnaissance aircraft Caproni Ca.313, which in Sweden came to be called B 16 and S 16.

He attended the Royal Swedish Naval Staff College's staff and communications course from 1945 to 1947, and then was promoted to lieutenant in 1947 and got his first commandership on the minesweeper HSwMS Ulvön. During the next two years, he came to participate in the extensive mine clearance operations that the Swedish Navy carried out after the end of the war. Kierkegaard served as a teacher at the Royal Swedish Naval Staff College from 1953 to 1957 and was promoted to lieutenant commander in 1956. During this time and was entrusted with service as captain of the destroyer HSwMS Visby as well as the newly built destroyers HSwMS Halland and HSwMS Småland. He developed a considerable knowledge of the action of hydrophone waves in the brackish waters of the Baltic Sea, and thus contributed to the development of the anti-submarine warfare tactics.

During the years 1957–1958, Kierkegaard was privileged to be the first Swede in the 20th century to undergo a command course at the Naval War College in the United States. Back in Sweden, he was appointed head of the Naval Department in the Defence Staff in Stockholm and was promoted to commander the following year. Kierkegaard was promoted to captain in 1963 and served as of commander of the 1st Destroyer Flotilla (Första jagarflottiljen) from 1963 to 1965 when he assumed the post of vice chief of the Southern Military District (Milo S) in Kristianstad. Kierkegaard was promoted to rear admiral in 1970 and was appointed Commander-in-Chief of the Coastal Fleet. He held the post for seven years before becoming commander of the East Coast Naval Base in 1977, a post which he held until 1983 when he retired from active service. During his time as commander of the East Coast Naval Base, the Hårsfjärden incident in the fall of 1982 occurred.

== Personal life ==
In 1941, Kierkegaard married Britt-Marie Arnegren (born 1919), the daughter of director (byråchef) Olof Arnegren and Hilda (née Hallman). They had four children: Hans (born 1942), Michael (born 1944), Anders (born 1947), and Amelie (born 1955).

Kierkegaard was the Inspector Magnificus EM II of the SjöHolm naval academic association.

== Death ==
Kierkegaard died on 24 December 1999 in Råsunda Parish in Solna Municipality, Sweden.

== Dates of rank ==
- 1939 – Acting sub-lieutenant
- 19?? – Sub-lieutenant
- 1947 – Lieutenant
- 1956 – Lieutenant commander
- 1960 – Commander
- 1963 – Captain
- 1970 – Rear admiral

== Awards and decorations ==
- (Sweden) Commander 1st Class of the Order of the Sword (6 June 1969)
- (Sweden) Commander of the Order of the Sword (11 November 1966)
- (Sweden) Knight of the Order of the Sword (1957)
- Knight 1st Class of the Order of the Lion of Finland

== Honours ==
- Member of the Royal Swedish Society of Naval Sciences (1956)
- Member of the Royal Swedish Academy of War Sciences (1968)

Military offices
Preceded by Dag Arvas	Commander-in-Chief of the Coastal Fleet; 1970–1977	Succeeded by Bengt Rasin
Preceded by Lars H:son Lundberg	East Coast Naval Base; 1977–1983	Succeeded by Bengt O'Konor
