= Claes Tornberg =

Swedish Navy officer

- Born: Claes Egmont Tornberg; 10 February 1936 (age 90); Västerås, Sweden
- Military career
- Allegiance: Sweden
- Branch: Swedish Navy
- Service years: 1958–1998
- Rank: Rear admiral
- Commands: Flag Captain; Coastal Fleet; Swedish Armed Forces Staff College; Swedish National Defence College

Rear Admiral Claes Egmont Tornberg (born 10 February 1936) is a retired Swedish Navy officer. He served as Commander-in-Chief of the Coastal Fleet from 1985 and 1990 and as head of the Swedish Armed Forces Staff College from 1990 to 1996 and the newly created Swedish National Defence College from 1997 to 1998.

== Early life ==
Tornberg was born on 10 February 1936 in Västerås Parish, Sweden, the son of colonel Egmont Tornberg and his wife Aina (née Setterborg). He passed studentexamen at Södra Latin in Stockholm on 7 May 1955.

== Career ==
Tornberg graduated from the Royal Swedish Naval Academy in September 1958. He underwent a staff course at the Swedish Armed Forces Staff College between 1966 and 1968, and attended the Naval War College in the United States from 1976 to 1977. Tornberg commanded the 11th Torpedo Boat Division (11. torpedbåtsdivisionen) from 1977 to 1979 and was head of the Naval Staff's Planning Section from 1979 to 1983.

He was promoted to captain on 25 June 1981. On 1 October 1983, Tornberg was appointed flag captain in the Coastal Fleet. He was promoted to rear admiral and appointed Commander-in-Chief of the Coastal Fleet from 1 October 1985.

In October 1990, Major General Evert Båge was to be replaced as the head of the Swedish Armed Forces Staff College. The Supreme Commander of the Swedish Armed Forces, General Bengt Gustafsson, proposed Tornberg for the job, but Defence Minister Roine Carlsson preferred Senior Colonel Einar Lyth. Despite all authorities except Gustafsson supporting Lyth, the appointment of Tornberg came as a surprise on 27 July 1990, during vacation time, with Carlsson absent. The decision was signed by Rune Molin and Bengt Göransson as acting Prime Minister and Defence Minister, respectively. This was one of several feuds between General Gustafsson and Defence Minister Carlsson.

When the Swedish Armed Forces Staff College was amalgamated with the Swedish National Defence College on 1 January 1997, Tornberg became its head. He retired on 31 March 1998.

Tornberg was a board member of the Kristineberg Center for Marine Research and Innovation from 1999.

== Personal life ==
Tornberg got engaged on 31 December 1958 to Ann-Charlotte von Hofsten (born 1937) at Borrud in Töreboda Municipality. She was the daughter of county council director Erland von Hofsten and his wife Ebba Sörensen. The banns were issued on 7 June 1959 and the wedding took place in Bäcks Church on 19 June 1959. The wedding officiant was court chaplain Robert Murray. Their daughter was born on 23 September 1962 at Allmänna BB in Stockholm and a second daughter was born on 31 December 1963 at Allmänna BB. He also has two sons.

== Dates of rank ==
- 1958 – Acting sub-lieutenant
- 1960 – Sub-lieutenant
- 1966 – Lieutenant
- 1971 – Lieutenant commander
- 1972 – Commander
- 1979 – Kommendörkapten med särskild tjänsteställning
- 25 June 1981 – Captain
- 1 October 1985 – Rear admiral

== Awards and decorations ==
- (Sweden) H. M. The King's Medal, 12th size gold (silver-gilt) medal worn around the neck on a blue ribbon (2007)
- (Sweden) Royal Swedish Society of Naval Sciences Medal of Merit in Gold (1999)

== Honours ==
- Member of the Royal Swedish Society of Naval Sciences (1977)
- Member of the Royal Swedish Academy of War Sciences (1983)
- President of the Royal Swedish Society of Naval Sciences (1991)

Military offices
Preceded by Jan Enquist	Commander-in-Chief of the Coastal Fleet; 1985–1990	Succeeded by Sten Swedlund
Preceded by Evert Båge	Swedish Armed Forces Staff College; 1990–1996	Succeeded by None
Preceded by Nils Gyldén	Swedish National Defence College; 1997–1998	Succeeded by Karlis Neretnieks
Professional and academic associations
Preceded by Bror Stefenson	Chairman of the Royal Swedish Society of Naval Sciences; 1991–2000	Succeeded by Bertil Björkman
