= Dag Arvas =

Swedish naval officer (1913–2004)

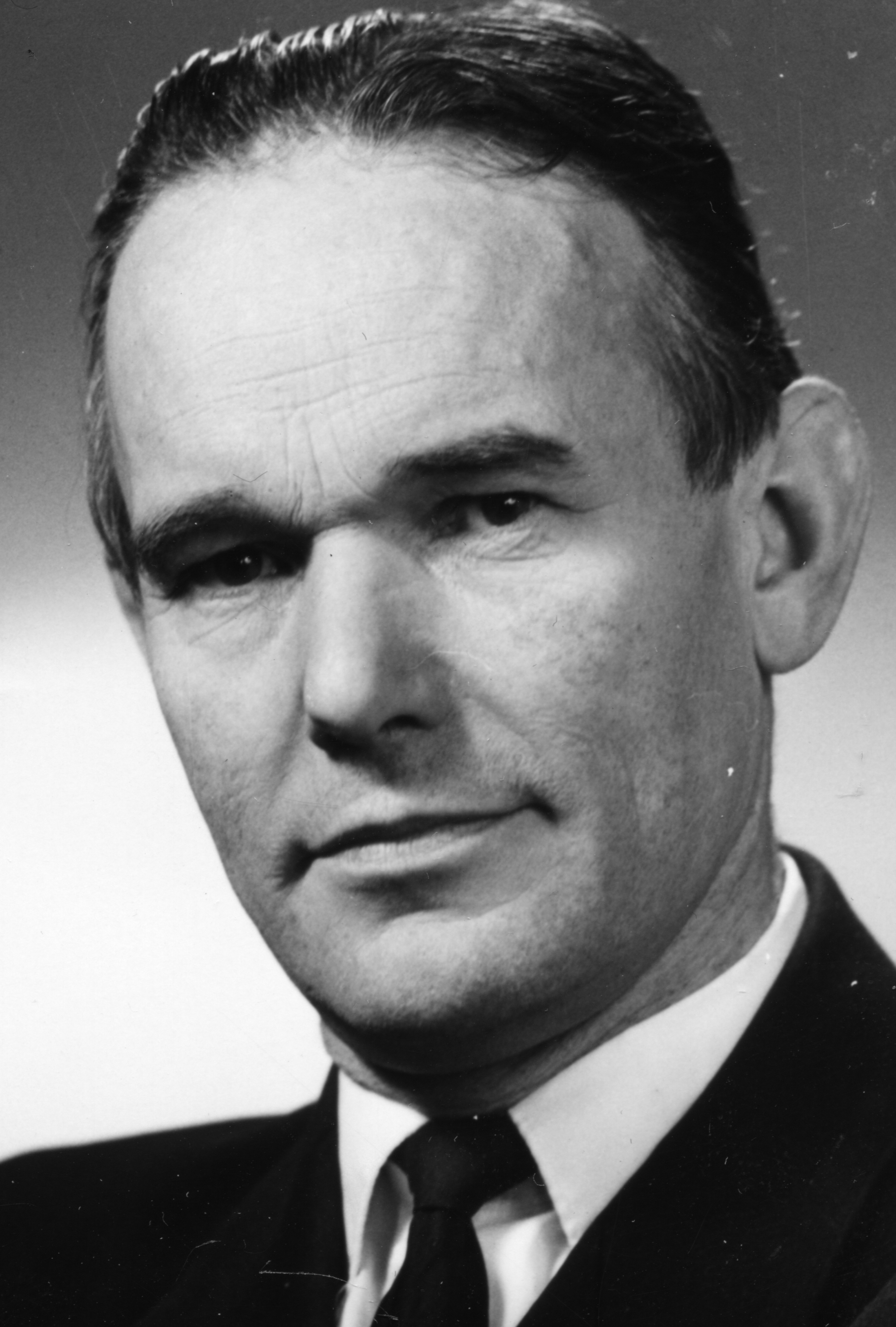
- Born: Dag Gustaf Christer Arvas; 22 September 1913; Arvidsjaur, Sweden
- Died: 1 February 2004 (aged 90); Stockholm, Sweden
- Military career
- Allegiance: Sweden
- Branch: Swedish Navy
- Service years: 1935–1978
- Rank: Rear Admiral
- Commands: HSwMS Uppland (J17); 1st Destroyer Flotilla; Vice Chief of the Defence Staff; Coastal Fleet; Military Office of the Minister of Defence

Rear Admiral Dag Gustaf Christer Arvas (22 September 1913 – 1 February 2004) was a Swedish Navy officer. Arvas senior commands include Vice Chief of the Defence Staff, Commander-in-Chief of the Coastal Fleet and Chief of the Military Office of the Minister of Defence.

== Early life ==
Arvas was born on 22 September 1913 in Arvidsjaur, Sweden, the son of Birger Arvas and his wife Elsa (née Christerson). He passed studentexamen in Djursholm in 1932

== Career ==
Arvas was commissioned as a naval officer in 1935 with the rank of acting sub-lieutenant. He was then on leave one summer for traveling with the Swedish sailing school's Kaparen in western European waters and he was educated at the Physical Training School (Gymnastik- och idrottsskolan, GIS) from 1937 to 1938. Arvas attended the Royal Swedish Naval Staff College from 1940 to 1942 and served aboard torpedo boats and destroyers. He also served as flag lieutenant (flaggadjutant) to the Commander-in-Chief of the Coastal Fleet from 1945 to 1948. Arvas served as captain of the destroyer HSwMS Uppland from 1950 to 1951 and commander of a destroyer squadron in 1954. He was promoted to lieutenant commander in 1953 and of the 1st rank in 1955.

During the years 1946-1953, Arvas was a teacher in parallel with other service at both the Royal Swedish Naval Staff College and the Royal Swedish Air Force Staff College. The land service was characterized by his involvement in the Supreme Commander investigation and in the defense committee in 1955-1958 where the foundation for the light fleet and Navy Plan 60 (Marinplan 60) were laid. Arvas served as head of the Operation Department in the Naval Staff from 1955 and as head of the Planning Department from 1958 to 1960 when he was promoted to captain. He then served as commanding officer of the 1st Destroyer Flotilla (Första jagarflottiljen) from 1960 to 1961 and as Vice Chief of the Defence Staff from 1961 to 1964. Arvas served as chief of Section 3 in the Naval Staff from 1964 to 1966 when he was promoted to rear admiral. He was then Commander-in-Chief of the Coastal Fleet from 1966 to 1970, chairman of the Royal Swedish Society of Naval Sciences from 1966 to 1969, and chief of the Military Office of the Minister of Defence from 1970 to 1978.

After his retirement in 1978 he was, among other things, a special investigator in the 1978 Civil Military Investigation (1978 års civilmilitärutredning).

== Personal life ==
In 1939, he married Gunvor Milles, the daughter of Tage Milles and Thora (née Rutensköld). Children: Christer (born 1941) and Stig (born 1944).

== Death ==
Arvas died on 1 February 2004 and was buried in Djursholm's Cemetery on 16 April 2004.

== Dates of rank ==
- 1935 – Acting sub-lieutenant
- 1937 – Sub-lieutenant
- 19?? – Lieutenant
- 1953 – Lieutenant commander
- 1955 – Commander
- 1960 – Captain
- 1966 – Rear admiral

== Awards and decorations ==
- (Sweden) Commander Grand Cross of the Order of the Sword (6 June 1973)
- (Sweden) Commander 1st Class of the Order of the Sword (6 June 1966)
- Grand Decoration of Honour in Silver with Star for Services to the Republic of Austria (1974)
- (Denmark) King Christian X's Liberty Medal
- (Mexico) Officer of the Order of the Aztec Eagle

== Hounors ==
- Honorary member of the Royal Swedish Society of Naval Sciences (1954)
- Member of the Royal Swedish Academy of War Sciences (1959)

Military offices
Preceded by Åke Lindemalm	Operations Department, Naval Staff; 1955–1957	Succeeded by ?
Preceded by Bengt Lundvall	Planning Department, Naval Staff; 1958–1960	Succeeded by Gunnar Grandin
Preceded by Åke Mangård	Vice Chief of the Defence Staff; 1961–1964	Succeeded by Bengt Lundvall
Preceded by Einar Blidberg	Commander-in-Chief of the Coastal Fleet; 1966–1970	Succeeded by Christer Kierkegaard
Preceded by Holger Henning	Military Office of the Minister of Defence; 1970–1978	Succeeded by Carl-Fredrik Algernon
Professional and academic associations
Preceded by Stig Bergelin	Chairman of the Royal Swedish Society of Naval Sciences; 1966–1969	Succeeded by Åke Lindemalm
