= Coastal Fleet =

Former military unit in Sweden

- Kustflottan
- Active: 1904–2000
- Country: Sweden
- Allegiance: Swedish Armed Forces
- Branch: Swedish Navy
- Type: Naval force composed of surface combatant, minelayer, minehunter and submarine units
- Role: Naval authority
- March: "Kustflottans marsch" (Åke Dohlin)

Insignia
- Naval Ensign

The Coastal Fleet (Swedish: Kustflottan, Kfl) was until 1994 a Swedish Navy authority with the main task of training the naval ships commanders and crews. After the formation of the authority Swedish Armed Forces in 1994, the Coastal Fleet remained as a unit until 2000.

== History ==
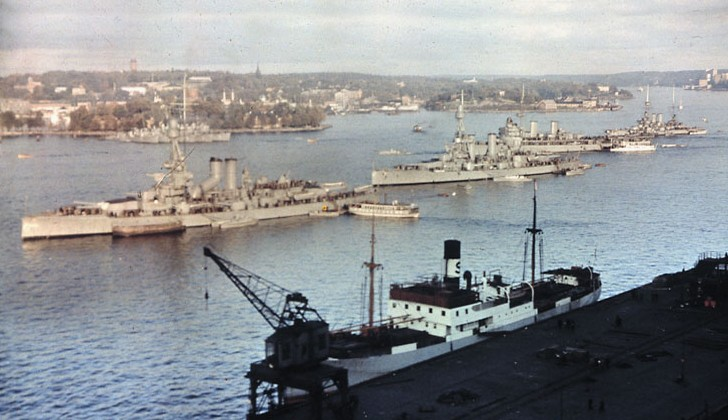
The Coastal Fleet at Strömmen in Stockholm in 1937.

The Coastal Fleet was the operational unit within the Swedish Navy, created from the combat forces capable of maritime operations. The Coastal Fleet was intended to serve as the mobile naval defence or battle group, encompassing all naval warfare capabilities such as artillery, torpedoes, and mines. It was designed to be capable of countering hostile actions along the Swedish coastlines independently of local defence tasks.

The Swedish Kustflottan formed for the dissolution of the union between Norway and Sweden gathered to Gothenburg consisted of a total of eight coastal defense armored cruisers, four torpedo cruisers, two destroyers, 24 torpedo boats and a submarine (based on the US Holland-class boat).

According to a decision in 1948, the Coastal Fleet would primarily consist of two squadrons, each with cruisers, destroyers, and large motor torpedo boats, along with a submarine and a mine flotilla. Additionally, on the Swedish West Coast, there would be a squadron of surface vessels and a submarine flotilla.

The command flag of the last Commander-in-Chief of the Coastal Fleet, Vice Admiral Frank Rosenius, was lowered on 30 June 1998.

== Heraldry and traditions ==
=== Colours, standards and guidons ===
The colour of the Coastal Fleet was a double swallow-tailed Swedish flag, which was presented in 1976. It was later taken over by the Joint Forces Command.

=== Coat of arms ===
The coat of the arms of the Coastal Fleet 1979–1997. Blazon: "Azure, an anchor erect cabled, argent".

== Commanding officers ==
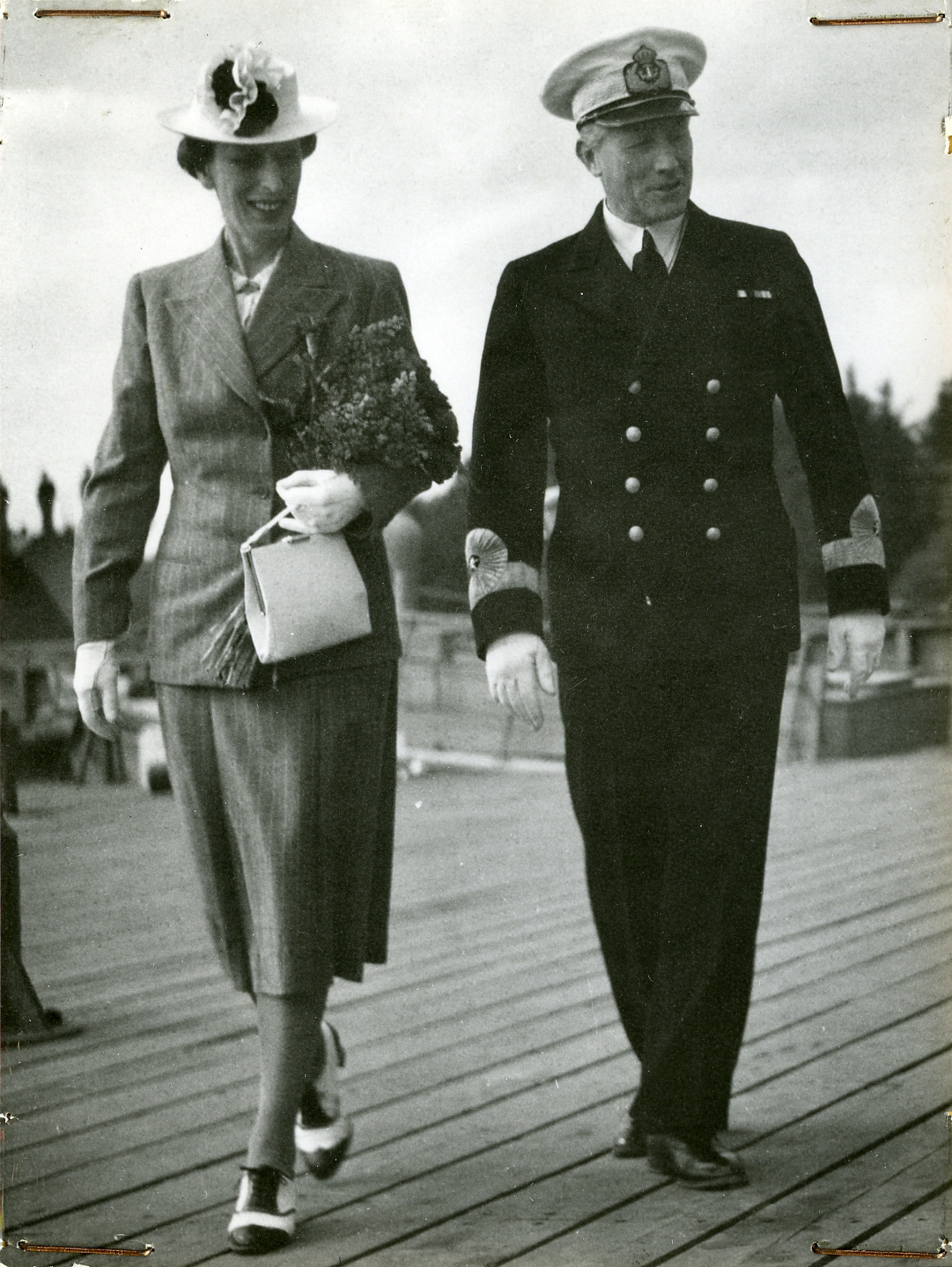
Commander-in-Chief of the Coastal Fleet, Rear Admiral Yngve Ekstrand and Louise Mountbatten in 1943.

The Swedish Navy's ships were prepared for expeditions during the summer months and organized into temporary squadrons under the command of the 'highest commander' (högste befälhavare). In 1904, an Inspector of Naval Exercises at Sea (Inspektör för flottans övningar till sjöss) was added, also serving as the highest commander of the coastal squadrons. Starting in 1909, the squadrons began to be referred to as coastal fleets. From 1919 onwards, the positions of Highest Commander and Inspector of Naval Exercises at Sea were merged (SFS 1918:868), and the position of Highest Commander of the Coastal Fleet (Högste befälhavaren för kustflottan) was established, changed in 1931 to Commander-in-Chief of the Coastal Fleet (Chefen för kustflottan).

=== Inspectors of Naval Exercises at Sea ===
- 1904–1906: Captain Wilhelm Dyrssen
- 1906–1907: Rear Admiral Carl Olsen
- 1907–1916: Rear Admiral Wilhelm Dyrssen
- 1916–1918: Vice Admiral Carl August Ehrensvärd

=== Highest Commanders of the Coastal Fleet ===
- 1919–1919: Vice Admiral Carl August Ehrensvärd
- 1919–1923: Rear Admiral Carl Alarik Wachtmeister
- 1923–1925: Rear Admiral Fredrik Riben
- 1926–1927: Rear Admiral Otto Lybeck
- 1927–1931: Rear Admiral Harald Åkermark

=== Commanders-in-Chief of the Coastal Fleet ===
- 1931–1933: Rear Admiral Harald Åkermark
- 1933–1939: Rear Admiral Fabian Tamm
- 1939–1942: Rear Admiral Gösta Ehrensvärd
- 1942–1945: Rear Admiral Yngve Ekstrand
- 1946–1950: Rear Admiral Erik Samuelson
- 1950–1953: Rear Admiral Stig H:son Ericson
- 1953–1957: Rear Admiral Erik af Klint
- 1957–1961: Rear Admiral Bertil Berthelsson
- 1961–1962: Rear Admiral Einar Blidberg (acting)
- 1962–1966: Rear Admiral Einar Blidberg
- 1966–1970: Rear Admiral Dag Arvas
- 1970–1977: Rear Admiral Christer Kierkegaard
- 1977–1980: Rear Admiral Bengt Rasin
- 1980–1982: Rear Admiral Bror Stefenson
- 1982–1985: Rear Admiral Jan Enquist
- 1985–1990: Rear Admiral Claes Tornberg
- 1990–1994: Rear Admiral Sten Swedlund
- 1994–1998: Rear Admiral Frank Rosenius

=== Flag Captains ===
- 1904–1907: Commander Herman Wrangel
- 1907–1907: Captain Carl August Ehrensvärd
- 1907–1909: Commander Gustaf af Klint
- 1909–1915: Commander Henning von Krusenstierna
- 1914–1915: Lieutenant commander Ulf Carl Knutsson Sparre (acting)
- 1915–1918: Captain Carl Alarik Wachtmeister
- 1918–1919: Lieutenant commander Henrik Gisiko
- 1920–1923: Captain Gustaf Starck
- 1923–1925: Captain Charles de Champs
- 1925–1930: Captain Claës Lindsström
- 1930–1931: Captain Fabian Tamm
- 1932–1933: Captain Hans Simonsson
- 1933–1936: Captain Gösta Ehrensvärd
- 1937–1939: Captain Yngve Ekstrand
- 1939–1941: Captain Helge Strömbäck
- 1941–1943: Captain Erik Anderberg
- 1943–1945: Captain Erik Samuelson
- 1946–1948: Captain John Wirström
- 1948–1950: –
- 1950–1951: Captain Erik af Klint
- 1951–1953: Captain Bertil Berthelsson
- 1953–1956: Captain Einar Blidberg
- 1957–1959: Captain Åke Lindemalm
- 1959–1964: Captain Magnus Starck
- 1964–1966: Captain Nils-Erik Ödman
- 1966–1971: Captain Alf Berggren
- 1971–1973: Captain Göte Blom
- 1973–1973: Commander Sigurd Håkansson
- 1973–1978: Captain Åke Johnson
- 1978–1980: Captain Lennart Forsman
- 1980–1980: Captain Bengt O'Konor
- 1980–1982: Captain Holger Grenstad
- 1982–1983: Captain Johan Bring
- 1983–1985: Captain Claes Tornberg
- 1985–1986: Captain Gustaf Taube
- 1986–1988: Captain Bengt Uggla
- 1988–1989: Captain Frank Rosenius
- 1989–1992: Captain Emil Svensson
- 1992–1994: Captain Christer Hägg
- 1994–1996: Captain Olof Jonsson
- 1996–1998: Captain Anders Stävberg
