= Frank Rosenius =

Swedish Navy officer

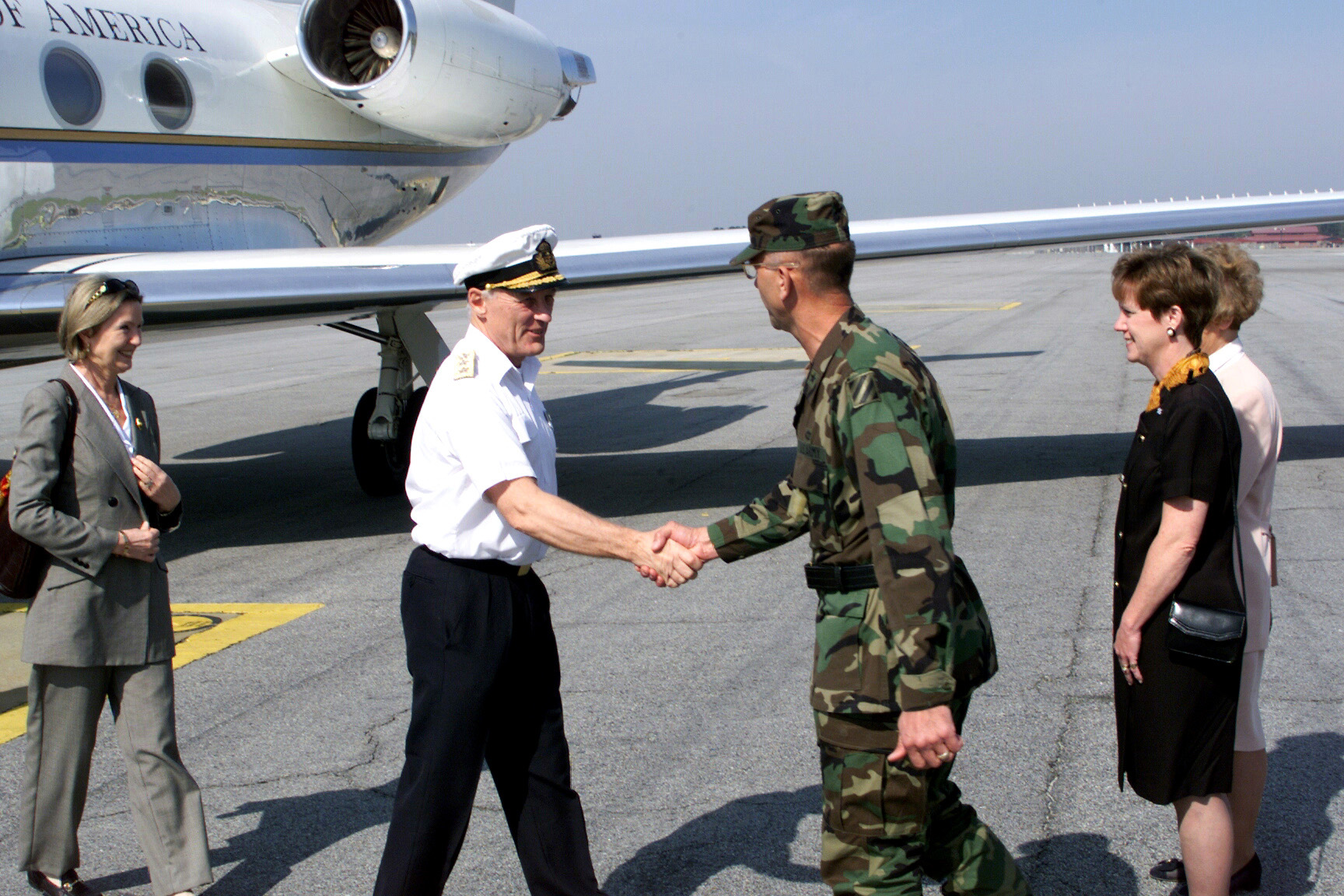
- Rosenius at Hunter Army Airfield, Georgia in 1999.
- Born: Frank Enver Roseniu; 2 June 1940 (age 86); Gävle, Sweden
- Military career
- Allegiance: Sweden
- Branch: Swedish Navy
- Service years: 1962–2001
- Rank: Vice Admiral
- Commands: HSwMS Sjöormen; Flag captain; 4th Surface Attack Flotilla; Coastal Fleet; Deputy Supreme Commander
- Other work: His Majesty's Military Staff

Vice Admiral Frank Enver Rosenius (born 2 June 1940) is a retired Swedish Navy officer. Rosenius senior commands include Commander-in-Chief of the Coastal Fleet from 1994 to 1998 and Deputy Supreme Commander from 1998 to 2000. Rosenius also served as chief of the His Majesty's Military Staff from 2003 to 2007.

== Early life ==
Rosenius was born on 2 June 1940 in Gävle, Sweden, the son of military officer Sven Rosenius and his wife Barbro (née Nordin). He has a younger brother, Claes (born 1946).

== Career ==
Rosenius graduated from the Royal Swedish Naval Academy in 1962 and spent his first years in submarines and was the captain of HSwMS Sjöormen from 1969 to 1970. Rosenius graduated from the Swedish National Defence College in 1974 and the Naval War College in United States in 1981. In 1984, Rosenius was a secretary in the investigation about the submarine incident in Karlskrona February–March 1984.

Rosenius was commanding officer of the 4th Surface Attack Flotilla from 1985 to 1988 and served as flag captain from 1988 to 1989 as well as assistant chief of Defence Staff (Operations) from 1989 to 1992. In 1991, Rosenius served as head of the Preparedness and Operations Section in the Defence Staff. He then served as deputy director-general (departementsråd) and deputy head of department of International and Security Affairs in the Ministry of Defence from 1993 to 1994.

On 1 July 1994, Rosenius was appointed Commander-in-Chief of the Coastal Fleet. He served in this position until 1998. On 1 July 1998, Rosenius was promoted to vice admiral and was appointed Deputy Supreme Commander at the Swedish Armed Forces Headquarters. For the purpose of, among other thing, relieving the Supreme Commander, a special position was created as Deputy Supreme Commander. These two together constitute the executive group. Rosenius led the headquarters work through coordination of the operations. He also exercised employer responsibility for the staff in the headquarters. In order to coordinate the operations he had a coordination department.

On 11 November 1999 a project called Management Organization 2000 (LO 2000) was launched in order to design the Swedish Armed Forces' new management organization. The main project leader was Rosenius, with the commander of the 1st rank (Kommendörkapten 1:a graden), Stefan Engdahl, as the main project secretary. After Rosenius retired from active service in 2001 he became a member of the Independent Fact Group, a group originally formed to clear up the many question marks about the MS Estonia disaster. There he led the work of developing an example of the MS Estonia's sinking process. In 1994, when Estonia sank, Rosenius was in charge of International and Security Affairs when the Swedish Navy assisted with the work on the bow visor.

On 30 January 2003, Rosenius was appointed First Aide-de-Camp and Chief of His Majesty's Military Staff from 1 April 2003. There he handled the contacts with the Swedish Armed Forces and was responsible for the king's 12 aide-de-camp's who relieved each other once a month and were constantly available at the king's side. Rosenius was also chairman of the Föreningen Armé- Marin- och Flygfilm ("Army, Navy and Air Film") from 2001 to 2007. He became a board member of the Royal Swedish Society of Naval Sciences from 1988. Rosenius was president of the Royal Swedish Academy of War Sciences until 21 May 2014 when he was succeeded by Mikael Odenberg.

== Personal life ==
Rosenius is married to Lisskulla Rosenius.

== Dates of rank ==
- 1993 – Rear admiral
- 1998 – Vice admiral

== Awards and decorations ==
=== Swedish ===
- (Sweden) H. M. The King's Medal, 12th size gold (silver-gilt) medal worn around the neck on the Royal Order of the Seraphim ribbon, for "meritorious efforts as Chief of His Majesty's Military Staff" (6 June 2007)
- (Sweden) Royal Swedish Academy of War Sciences Medal of Reward in gold, 15th size (2018)
- (Sweden) Royal Swedish Society of Naval Sciences Medal of Merit in Gold (29 September 2010)

=== Foreign ===
- (Iceland) Grand Cross of the Order of the Falcon (7 September 2004)
- Commander 1st Class of the Order of the White Rose of Finland

== Honours ==
- Member of the Royal Swedish Society of Naval Sciences (1979)
- Member of the Royal Swedish Academy of War Sciences (1988)
- Inspector Supremus EM V of the naval academic association SjöHOLM

== Bibliography ==
- Rosenius, Frank (2017). Ett nytt totalförsvar: en vitbok från KV21 (Krigsvetenskap i 21:a århundradet) (in Swedish). Stockholm: Kungl. Krigsvetenskapsakademien. ISBN 978-91-88581-03-7. SELIBR 22410658.
- von Hofsten, Gustaf; Rosenius, Frank, eds. (2009). Kustflottan: de svenska sjöstridskrafterna under 1900-talet. Marinlitteraturföreningen, 0348-2405; 94Forum navales skriftserie, 1650-1837; 34 (in Swedish). Stockholm: Kungliga Örlogsmannasällskapet. ISBN 978-91-977973-1-3. SELIBR 11621245.

Military offices
Preceded by Bengt Uggla	Flag captain 1988–1989	Succeeded by Emil Svensson
Preceded by Sten Swedlund	Commander-in-Chief of the Coastal Fleet; 1994–1998	Succeeded by None
Preceded by Percurt Green	Deputy Supreme Commander; 1998–2000	Succeeded by Hans Berndtson
Court offices
Preceded by Curt Sjöö	Chief of His Majesty's Military Staff; 2003–2007	Succeeded by Håkan Pettersson
Professional and academic associations
Preceded by Bo Huldt	President of the Royal Swedish Academy of War Sciences; 2010–2014	Succeeded by Mikael Odenberg
