= Swedish Armed Forces Staff College =

Former Swedish military training institution

- Militärhögskolan
- Type: Staff college
- Active: 1961–1996
- Parent institution: Swedish Armed Forces
- Affiliations: Army, Navy, Air Force
- Location: Valhallavägen 117, Stockholm
- Language: Swedish
- March: "Schlippenbachs marsch" (1964–1995) "Generalfälttygmästaren" (1995–1996)

The [Royal] Swedish Armed Forces Staff College (Note: or the Royal Staff College of the [Swedish] Armed Forces. The word "Royal" (Kungliga) was later removed.) (Swedish: Militärhögskolan, MHS) was from 1961 to 1996 the Swedish Armed Forces highest institution for officers training, for staff and senior executive education and was located in Stockholm. In 1997 it was merged with the Swedish National Defence College and formed the "new" Swedish National Defence College.

== History ==
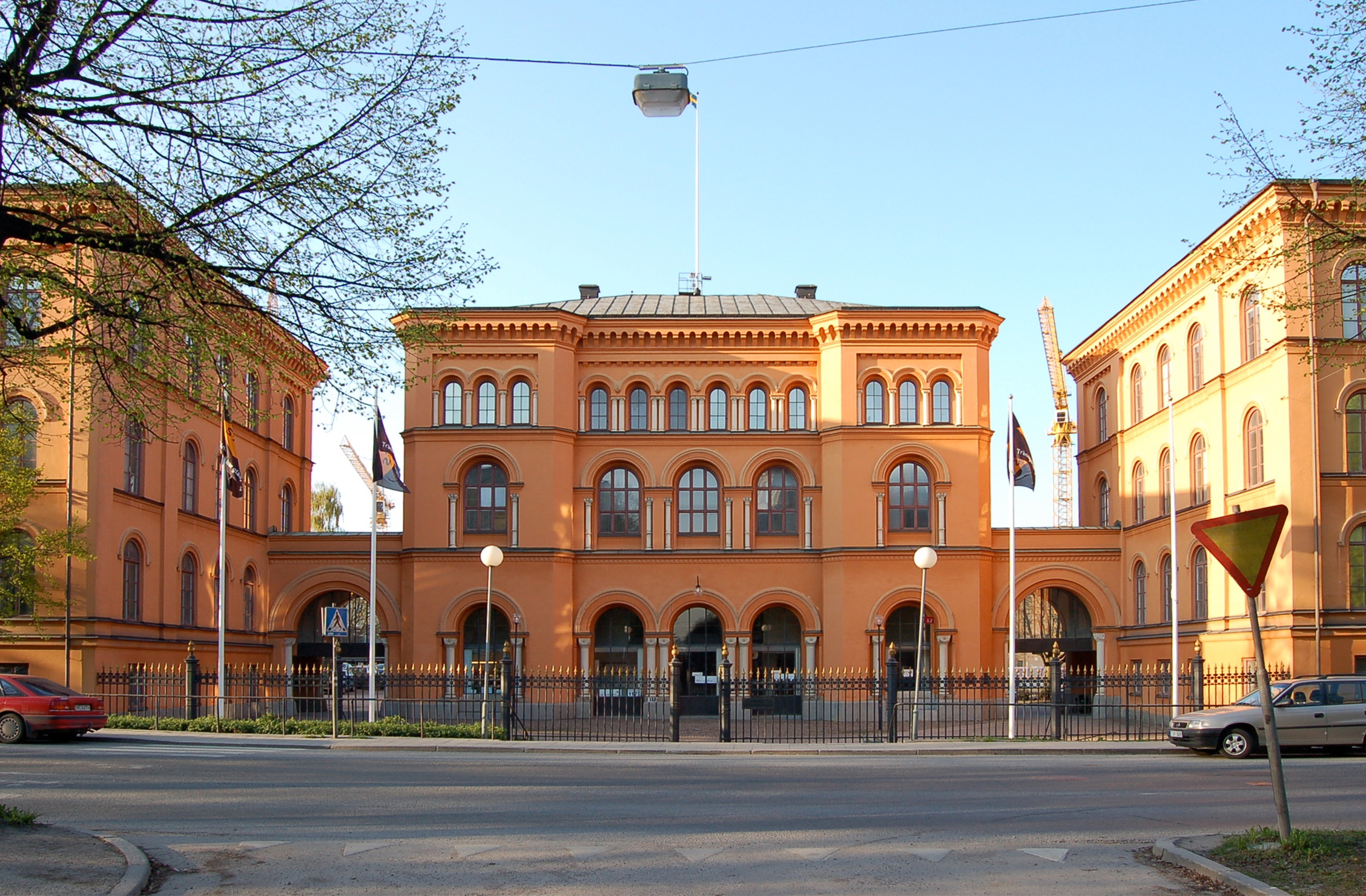
Location of the staff college at Valhallavägen 117, Stockholm.

During the first part of the 20th century, the higher officer education was developed in the three military branches, the Army, Navy and Air Force. During the two world wars a variety of new weapons such as armor, air, gas, submarines and nuclear weapons were introduced. Then came the Cold War, which contributed so that the higher officer training at the Royal Swedish Army Staff College, the Royal Swedish Naval Staff College and the Royal Swedish Air Force Staff College in 1961 were merged into a joint staff college, named the Royal Swedish Armed Forces Staff College. The operations began on 1 October 1961 and the first instruction was established on 14 May 1964. It organized compulsory general courses, often military branch targeted and aimed for captain positions, as well as higher volunteer staff courses and technical courses.

In 1992 the military branch programmes were incorporated and then there were the following programmes: Tactical Program (TAKLI), Staff Program (SLI), Technical Program (TEKLI) and Operational Program (OPLI). In 1994, the National School of Administration (Förvaltningshögskolan, FörvHS) was integrated with the Swedish Armed Forces Staff College, which became its own government agency. In 1995, parts of the Swedish National Defence Research Institute were transferred to the new Swedish Armed Forces Staff College. A special research area for security policy, strategy and military history was then established. In 1996, the government found that the link between civil and military defense had become increasingly important and, according to the government, there were strong reasons for the Swedish Armed Forces Staff College to merge with the Swedish National Defence College. The following year, the Swedish National Defence College and the Swedish Armed Forces Staff College were merged and formed the "new" Swedish National Defence College.

The main part of the staff college was located at Valhallavägen 117 in Stockholm, in the chancellery building and barracks of the old Svea Artillery Regiment (A 1). Smaller units of the staff college were located in Östersund and Karlstad.

== Heads ==
- 1961–1974: Erik Rosengren
- 1974–1978: Gustaf Peyron
- 1978–1984: Nils-Fredrik Palmstierna
- 1984–1990: Evert Båge
- 1990–1996: Claes Tornberg

== Names, designations and locations ==
Name	Translation	From		To
Kungl. Militärhögskolan	Royal Swedish Armed Forces Staff College	1961-10-01	–	1974-12-31
Militärhögskolan	Swedish Armed Forces Staff College	1975-01-01	–	1996-12-31
Designation		From		To
MHS		1961-10-01	–	1996-12-31
Location		From		To
Stockholm Garrison		1961-10-01	–	1996-12-31
