= Schillerska gymnasiet =

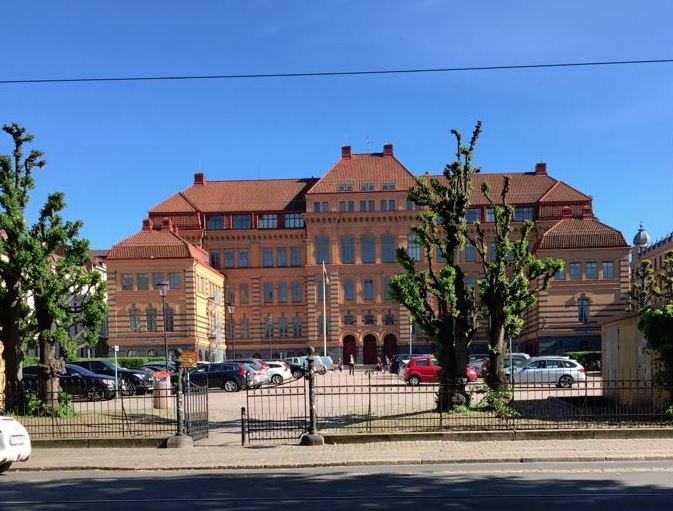

Location
- Gothenburg, Sweden; 57°41′50″N 11°58′6″E

Information
- Type: Upper secondary school Public
- Established: 1867
- Rector: Anne Hörnberg, Azade Hatami and Ola Lindhé
- Newspaper: Schilldringar
- Website: goteborg.se/wps/portal/schillerskagymnasiet

Schillerska gymnasiet is an upper secondary school (Swedish: gymnasium) located in Vasastan, in the central parts of Gothenburg, Sweden. It was first established in 1866 as Göteborgs Högre Realläroverk.

The school went co-educational in 1964, and two years later it assumed its current name of Schillerska gymnasiet.

== Notable students ==
- Sture Allén, professor of Computational Linguistics
- Joel Alme, musician
- Jenny Berggren, musician
- Linn Berggren, musician, former member of Ace of Base
- Marcus Birro, poet and author
- Peter Birro, script writer
- Tommy Blom, musician
- Reine Brynolfsson, actor
- Nooshi Dadgostar, politician
- Olof Dreijer, musician and record producer, member of The Knife
- Oscar Dronjak, musician
- Anton Glanzelius, actor
- Bengt Hallberg, musician
- Jan Hjärpe, professor in Islamic Studies
- Anneli Hulthén, politician
- Magnus Johansson, footballer
- Jens Lekman, musician
- Eric Lemming, athlete
- Tomas Lindberg, musician
- Cecilia Malmström. politician
- Ruben Östlund, director
- Kay Pollak, film director
- Gideon Ståhlberg. Chess Grandmaster
- Sven Wollter, actor
