= Studentexamen =

Former university entrance examination in Sweden

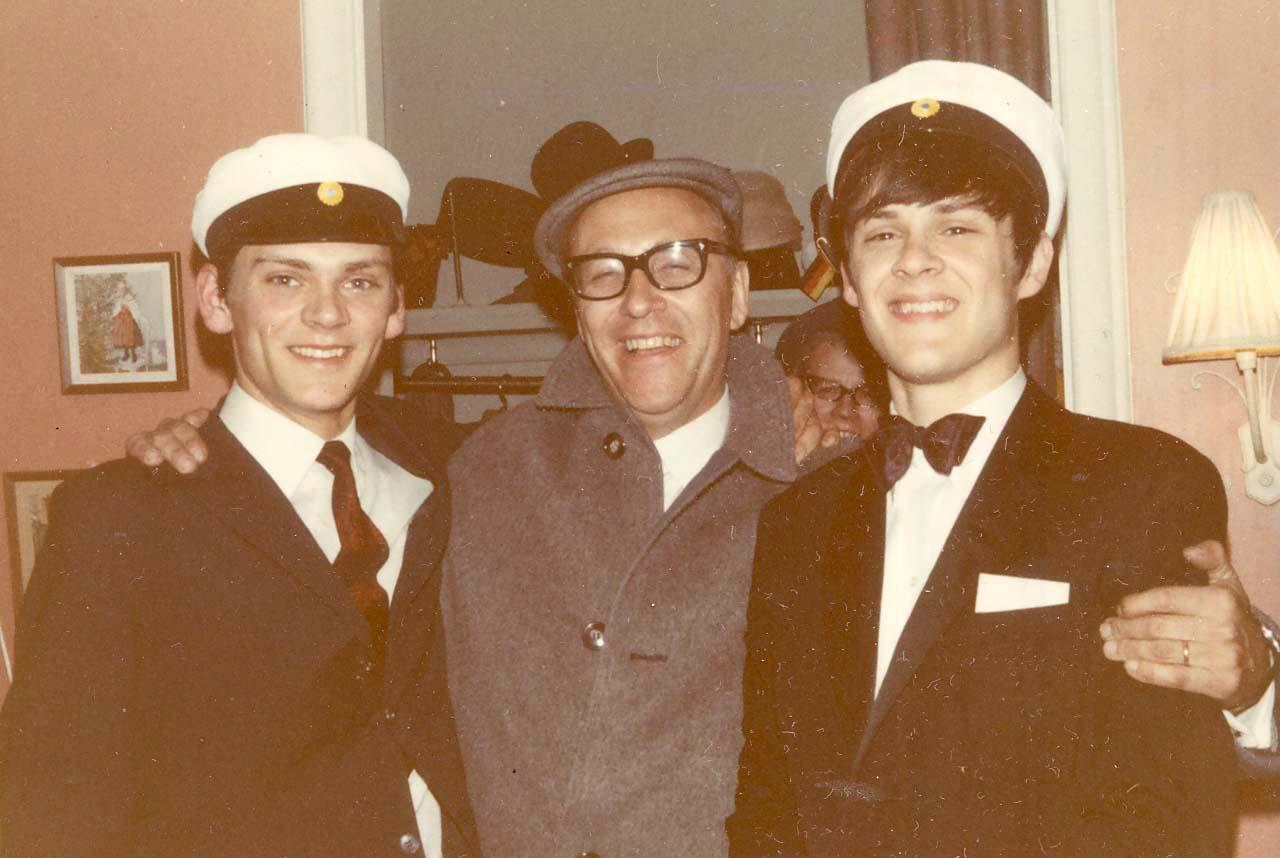
Young men celebrating Studentexamen with a relative, in the final year of the formal exams 1968.

Studentexamen (Swedish for "students' examination" or "students' degree"), earlier also mogenhetsexamen ("maturity examination") was the name of the university entrance examination in Sweden from the 17th century to 1968. From 1862 to 1968, it was taken as a final written and oral exam on graduation from gymnasium (secondary school). In Finland the examination (Finnish: Ylioppilastutkinto) still exists (Finland parted from Sweden 1809). The exam traces its origin to the academic statutes from 1655 requiring the dean to examine students arriving at university before allowing matriculation. According to the school reglement of 1693, a prospective student was to have gone through both a final examination at school and an entrance examination at university. The school reglement of 1724 allowed students without a final examination from school to enroll at university, provided a person known at the university would guarantee their behaviour, which led to it becoming common for students (called sponsionsstudenter or kautionsstudenter) from wealthy families to be matriculated at a very young age, accompanied by a private tutor. Although these were not actually supposed to be allowed to graduate, this rule was not always strictly upheld.

Attempts at a reform of the system led to the proposition in 1828 of the so-called Large Commission on Education, allowing students who had not completed a studentexamen to matriculate but disallowing them both from taking a degree or receiving any form of scholarship. The proposition also defined nine disciplines: Latin, Greek, Hebrew, Modern languages, Theology, Philosophy, Mathematics, History with Geography and Natural history, of which the prospective student had to have a grade of approbatur (Latin; in Swedish godkänd) in six and admittitur (a lower grade, in Swedish called försvarlig) in the three other to be allowed to enter university. These examinations were all oral, but a few years later, written examinations were introduced in Swedish and Latin.

In 1864, the studentexamen was moved from the universities to the secondary schools. It was thus changed from being primarily an entrance examination to academic studies to being a graduation diploma from the gymnasium or läroverk. In order to retain some academic control over the standard, a system was conceived where the Crown would appoint "censors" from the universities to take part in the examinations, and, if necessary, to fail a student passed by the teachers. The name of the examination was changed to mogenhetsprövning or mogenhetsexamen ("maturity examination"), and was known under this name until 1905, when the name studentexamen was restored.

With the new secondary school system (the gymnasieskola or "gymnasium school") introduced in 1968, the final examination or studentexamen was abolished, but the word is in colloquial use for the completion of secondary school, known as gymnasieexamen, based on grades from cumulative courses.

== See also ==
- Student cap
- Matriculation exam (Finland), also called studentexamen (in Swedish)
- Studenter-eksamen (Denmark)
- Education in Sweden
