= Master of the Horse =

Position of varying importance in several European nations

Master of the Horse is an official position in several European nations. It was more common when most countries in Europe were monarchies, and is of varying prominence today.

== Magister Equitum (ancient Rome) ==
The original Master of the Horse (Latin: Magister Equitum) in the Roman Republic was an office appointed and dismissed by the Roman Dictator, and expired with the Dictator's own office, typically a term of six months in the early and mid-republic. The Magister Equitum served as the Dictator's main lieutenant. The Dictator nominated the Magister Equitum, unless a senatus consultum specified, as was sometimes the case, the appointee. The Dictator could not rule without a Magister Equitum to assist him, and, consequently, if the first Magister Equitum either died or was dismissed during the Dictator's term, another had to be nominated in his stead.

The Magister Equitum was granted a form of imperium, but at the same level as a praetor, and thus was subject to the imperium of the Dictator and his powers were not superior to those of a Consul. In the Dictator's absence, the Magister Equitum became his representative, and exercised the same powers as the Dictator. It was usually, but not always, necessary for the Magister Equitum to have already held the office of Praetor. Accordingly, the Magister Equitum had the insignia of a praetor: the toga praetexta and an escort of six lictors. The most famous Master of the Horse is Mark Antony, who served during Julius Caesar's first dictatorship, with disastrous results. As a result of this, Caesar appointed Marcus Aemilius Lepidus, who had a history of successful administration over the city of Rome and Hispania Citerior, to replace Antony and govern in Rome when Caesar went to suppress the renewed Civil War in North Africa.

After the constitutional reforms of Augustus, the office of Dictator fell into disuse, along with that of the Magister Equitum. The title magister equitum was revived in the late Empire, when Constantine I established it as one of the supreme military ranks, alongside the Magister Peditum ("Master of the Foot"). Eventually, the two offices would be amalgamated into that of the Magister Militum ("Master of the Soldiers").

The title Constable, from the Latin comes stabuli or count of the stables, has a similar history.

== Master of the Horse (United Kingdom) ==
=== Historical role ===
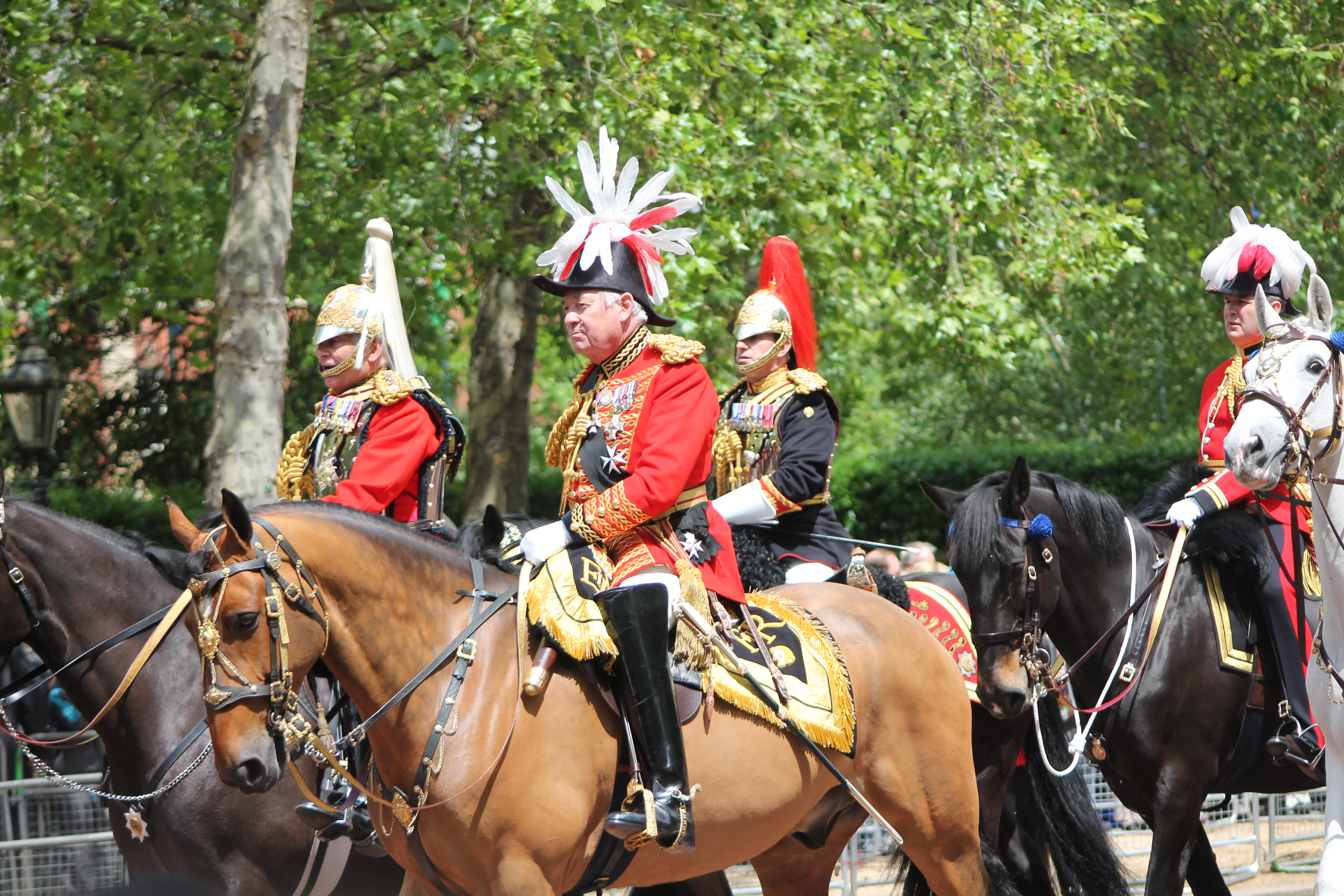
Lord Vestey, Master of the Horse from 1999 to 2018, riding to the Queen's Birthday Parade in 2012

The Master of the Horse in the United Kingdom was once an important official of the sovereign's household, though the role is largely ceremonial today. The master of the horse is the third dignitary of the court, and was always a member of the ministry (before 1782 the office was of cabinet rank), a peer and a privy counsellor. All matters connected with the horses and formerly also the hounds of the sovereign, as well as the stables and coachhouses, the stud, mews and previously the kennels, are within his jurisdiction.

The practical management of the Royal Stables and stud devolves on the chief or Crown Equerry, formerly called the Gentleman of the Horse, whose appointment was always permanent. The Clerk Marshal had the supervision of the accounts of the department before they are submitted to the Board of Green Cloth, and was in waiting on the Sovereign on state occasions only.

Exclusive of the Crown Equerry there were seven regular equerries, besides extra and honorary equerries, one of whom was always in attendance on the Sovereign and rode at the side of the royal carriage. They were always officers of the army, and each of them was on duty for about the same time as the lords and grooms in waiting. There are still several pages of honour who are nominally in the master of the horse's department, who must not be confounded with the pages of various kinds who are in the department of the Lord Chamberlain. They are youths aged from twelve to sixteen, selected by the sovereign in person, to attend on him or her at state ceremonies. At King Charles III's coronation they assisted the Groom of the Robes in carrying the royal train.

=== Modern role ===
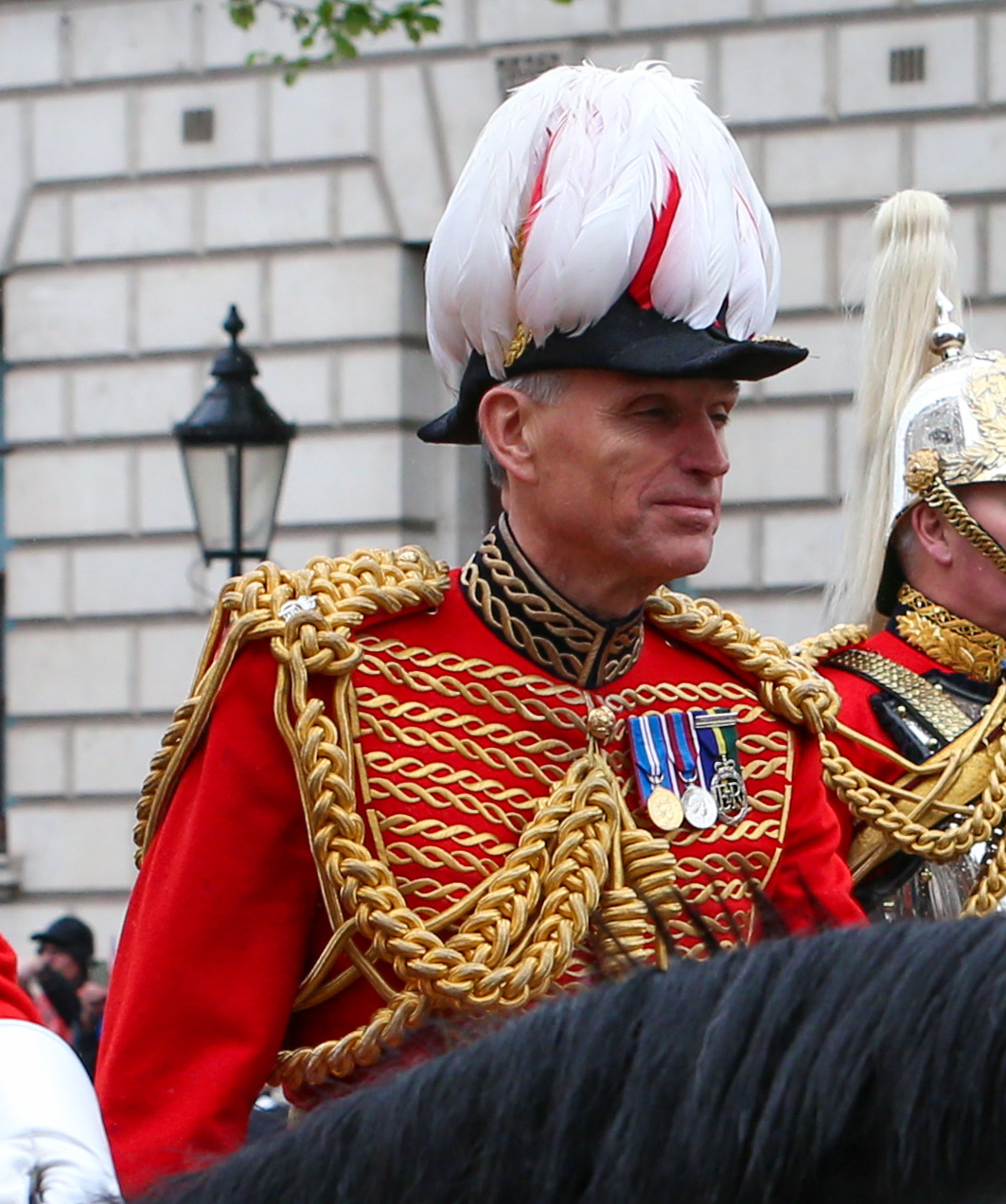
Lord de Mauley as Master of the Horse during the coronation of Charles III in 2023

The current Master of the Horse is Henry Ashton, 4th Baron Ashton of Hyde.

Today the Master of the Horse has a primarily ceremonial office, and rarely appears except on state occasions, and especially when the Sovereign is mounted. The Crown Equerry has daily oversight of the Royal Mews, which provides vehicular transport for the Sovereign, both cars and horse-drawn carriages. Train travel is arranged by the Royal Travel Office, which also co-ordinates air transport.

The Pages of Honour, who appear only on ceremonial occasions, and the Equerries, were nominally under the authority of the Master of the Horse. The former are now controlled by the Keeper of the Privy Purse. The latter are effectively independent, and are functionally closer to the Private Secretary's Office. There are now three equerries to the Sovereign, and a larger number of extra equerries: usually retired officers with some connection to the Royal Household. The extra equerries are rarely if ever required for duty, but the Equerries are in attendance on the Sovereign on a daily basis. For some years the senior Equerry has also held the position of Deputy Master of the Household. The permanent equerry is an officer of major rank or equivalent, recruited from the three armed services in turn. Many previous equerries have gone on to reach high rank. The temporary equerry is a Captain of the Coldstream Guards, who provides part-time attendance. When not required for duty he has additional regimental or staff duties. Senior members of the royal family also have one or two equerries.

== Grand Squire of France ==
In France, the master of the horse, known as the Grand Squire of France (Grand Écuyer, or more usually Monsieur le grand) was one of the seven Great Officers of the Crown of France from 1595. As well as the superintendence of the royal stables, he had that of the retinue of the sovereign, also the charge of the funds set aside for the religious functions of the court, coronations, etc. On the death of a sovereign he had the right to all the horses and their equipment in the royal stables. He oversaw personally the "Great Stable" (grande écurie). Distinct from this officer and independent of him, was the first equerry (Premier Ecuyer), who had charge of the horses which the sovereign used personally (La petite écurie), and who attended on him when he rode out. The office of master of the horse existed down to the reign of Louis XVI. Under Louis XVIII and Charles X the duties were discharged by the first equerry, but under Napoleon I and Napoleon III the office was revived with much of its old importance.

== Oberststallmeister (Austria) ==
In the Habsburg monarchy, the Oberststallmeister, together with the Obersthofmeister, Oberstkämmerer and Oberstmarschall, was one of the four principal functions on the Court, reserved to the high nobility. The Oberststallmeister was in charge of the court stables, the riding school and the fleet of court carriages and other forms of transport. The thoroughbred horses and magnificent equipages were a cornerstone of aristocratic display, that gave this function its prestige.

== Oberststallmeister (Germany) ==
In Germany the master of the horse (Oberststallmeister) was a high court dignitary in several German Courts. In the Holy Roman Empire, his office was merely titular, the superintendence of the Emperor's stables having been carried out by the Oberstallmeister, an official corresponding to the crown equerry in England.

== Caballerizo mayor (Spain) ==
The Caballerizo mayor was the Officer of the Royal Household and Heritage of the Crown of Spain in charge of the trips, the mews and the hunt of the King of Spain.

The Office of "Caballerizo mayor" was one of the main Offices of the Royal Household in charge of the Royal Stables and everything related to the transportation of the Monarch. When the King sorted out from the Royal Palace, the Caballerizo had the main position behind him and the major rang over the other Court Officials. He managed as well the stables, the carriages and the horses. He was assisted by the "Primeros Caballerizos" (First Equerries) who were nominated by him.

He was in charge of the Royal hunt as "Montero mayor" (Great Hunter) holding, in many cases, the "Alcaldías" (Majorships) of the Spanish royal sites.

== Papal Master of the Horse ==
The Master of the Horse, Cavallerizzo Maggiore, or Hereditary Superintendent of the Stables of the Palaces, was a hereditary position held by the Marquess Serlupi Crescenzi. The office was a Participating Privy Chamberlain of the Sword and Cape, in the papal household. It was abolished in the reforms of the Papal Curia of 1968.

== Riksstallmästare/Överhovstallmästare (Sweden) ==
The holder of the title Master of the Horse of the Realm (Riksstallmästare) in Sweden was not one of the Great Officers of the Realm, but rather one of the Lesser Officers of the Realm. He was the superintendent of the Royal Stables and of the realm's stud farms. As such he was important in military matters, and often he had a tight connection with the army, and then especially with the army's cavalry units. His duties were partly taken over by the Master of the Horse (Överhovstallmästare).

== Konyushy (Russia) ==
Konyushy (Russian: Конюший) is literally translated as Master of the Horse or Equerry.

Konyushy was a boyar in charge of the stables of Russian rulers. It was a high title at the court of Russian rulers until the 17th century. By the end of the 15th century a special Equerry Office (конюшенный приказ, "konyushenny prikaz") was introduced, headed by the Konyushy. It was in charge of the Tsar's stables, parade equipage, ceremonies of court ride-offs, and military horse breeding. At one point Boris Godunov was konyushy. The Equerry Office handled a significant amount of Tsar's treasures, related to harness and horse/horseman armor, which were transferred to the Kremlin Armoury in 1736.

== Koniuszy (Kingdom of Poland and Grand Duchy of Lithuania) ==
"Koniuszy" (corresponding to the English-language "Equerry" or "Master of the Horse") was a position of nobility known in the Kingdom of Poland from the 11th century, and in the Grand Duchy of Lithuania from the 15th. A koniuszy had charge of the stables and herds of a Grand Duke or King; in reality, it was a podkoniuszy (sub-equerry), subordinate to the koniuszy, who had the more direct responsibility.

From the 14th to 16th centuries, a "koniuszy" was a dignitary (dygnitarz) in the Polish Kingdom and in the Polish–Lithuanian Commonwealth.

== Georgia ==
In the Kingdom of Georgia, the similar post was known under the name of amilakhvari (amir-akhori, lit.: Prince-Master of the Horse), derived from Arabic. It was a deputy to the commander-in-chief (amir-spasalari) and a member of the royal council. From the 1460s to the Russian annexation of Georgia (1801), the office was hereditary in the Zevdginidze-Amilakhvari family.

== Mirahur/İmrahor (Ottoman Empire) ==
The İmrahor (Ottoman Turkish: مير اخور)—also known as mirahur, mirahor, or emîr-i ahûr—was a palace official in the Ottoman Empire responsible for the care of the Sultan's horses. Those serving in this role were generally selected from the saray oğlanları (palace pages) trained in the Bîrun. Various viziers were promoted from the position of İmrahor.

== Hungary ==
In the Kingdom of Hungary the master of the horse (Hungarian: főlovászmester) was one of the high officials of the royal household.

== Asia ==
Similar posts were common in the imperial courts of China and Japan, the royal courts of Korea, and elsewhere in East Asia. The position, known as "Sima" in Chinese (司马), literally means "Master of the Horse". It was first created in the Western Zhou dynasty, with responsibility for military administration and conscription. The position was below the Three Grand Offices and equivalent in status to the six ministers. It was often grouped with four other positions also named with the "Si-" (control, administer) prefix as the "five officials" (五官). The title was used in different ways in subsequent dynasties. The Han Dynasty awarded "Grand Sima" as an additional title to high generals, in which context it is often translated into English as "Marshal".

"Sima" also became a Chinese surname, adopted by descendants of one occupant of the office. The Sima family became emperors in the Jin dynasty, as a result of which "Sima" ceased to exist as an official position in the central bureaucracy. However, in later dynasties it was used as the name of various relatively minor positions in the military and local administration, and was also used informally to refer to the Minister of War.

The Siamese kingdom of Ayutthaya had a Master of the Royal Elephants. The holder of this office was titled Krom Phra Gajapala (Thai: กรมพระคชบาล). Beneath him in rank was a Master of the Royal Horse who was titled Krom Phra Asvaraja (Thai: กรมพระอัศวราช). This demonstrated that the ancient Siamese attached more importance to the maintenance of war Elephant than a cavalry force.

== See also ==
- Constable
- Constitution of the Roman Republic
- Cursus honorum
- Equerry
- List of British ministries
- Marshal
