= Hans Ramel =

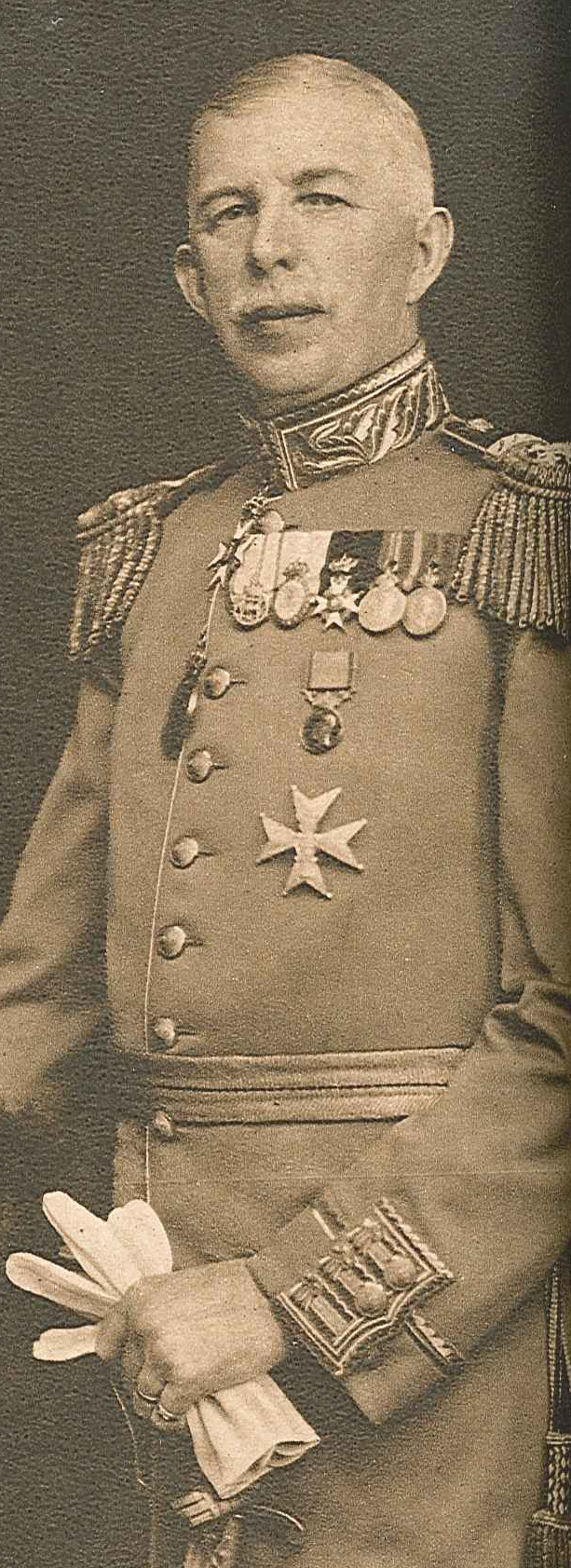
Hans Ramel

Baron Hans Otto Carl Ramel (19 August 1867 – 23 January 1957) was a Swedish landlord, Hovjägmästare, Master of the Horse and member of parliament.

== Early life ==
Ramel was born on 19 August 1867 at Övedskloster Manor in Sjöbo Municipality, Sweden, the son of ryttmästare, baron Otto Ramel and his wife baroness Charlotte (née von Blixen-Finecke). He became a volunteer at the Scanian Hussar Regiment in 1884 and passed mogenhetsexamen in 1887.

== Career ==
Ramel was appointed sergeant at the Scanian Hussar Regiment in 1888 and attended the Royal Military Academy the same year and graduated and became an officer on 23 October 1889 and was appointed underlöjtnant in the Scanian Hussar Regiment on 8 November 1889. He retired from the army in 1901 and became Hovjägmästare in 1902. Ramel was part of the Swedish Landstorm from 1902 to 1926. Ramel became First Hovjägmästare in 1921 and Master of the Horse in 1932.

He was municipal chairman from 1899 to 1933, and a member of the Riksdag's upper house Första kammaren from 1917 to 1918. Ramel was chairman of Skåne Mortgage Association (Skånska hypoteksföreningen), Malmöhus County Forestry Board (Malmöhus läns skogsvårdsstyrelse), Malmöhus County Fishery Board (Malmöhus läns fiskeristyrelse), Malmö Handicraft Association (Malmö hemslöjdsförening), Färs Hundred Savings Bank (Färs härads sparbank), Skånska Lantmännen Livestock Insurance Association (Skånska lantmännens kreatursförsäkringsförening), the Swedish Friesian Breeders Association (Avelsföreningen för svensk låglandsboskap) and the Swedish Ardennes Breeders Association (Avelsföreningen Svenska Ardennerhästen). He also sat in the governing council of the Stud Board (Stuteriöverstyrelsen).

Ramel became a member of the Royal Swedish Academy of Agriculture in 1924.

== Personal life ==
In 1893 in Helsingborg he married baroness Fanny Cederström (1870–1962), the daughter of lieutenant general, baron Claes Arvid Bror Cederström and his wife baroness Amelie Virginie Tomasine Eleonore (née Ehrensvärd). He was the father of; Amelie Charlotte (born 1894), Otto Bror (born 1896), Charlotte (born 1897), Viveka (born 1899), Bror (born 1900) and Elsa (born 1902).

== Awards and decorations ==
Ramel's awards:

- King Oscar II and Queen Sofia's Golden Wedding Medal (1907)
- King Gustaf V's Jubilee Commemorative Medal (1948)
- King Gustaf V's Jubilee Commemorative Medal (1928)
- King Gustaf V's Commemorative Medal (1951)
- Commander Grand Cross of the Order of the Polar Star
- Commander Grand Cross of the Order of Vasa
- Knight of the Order of the Polar Star (1917)
- Knight of the Order of Vasa (1909)
- Illis Quorum, 8th size (1937)
- Commander Second Class of the Order of the Dannebrog (1919)

Court offices
Preceded by Fredrik Wrangel	Master of the Horse; 1932–1957	Succeeded by Vacant
