= Bundesimmobiliengesellschaft =

Austrian quasi-governmental company

Bundesimmobiliengesellschaft m.b.H
- Type: GmbH (≈ limited liability company)
- Industry: Real estate
- Predecessor: Federal Buildings Directorate Vienna (Bundesbaudirektion Wien); Various Federal Buildings Administrations (Bundesgebäudeverwaltungen)
- Founded: Vienna, Austria (December 29, 1992)
- Founder: Government of Austria
- Headquarters: Vienna, Austria
- Area served: Restricted to the territory of the Republic of Austria
- Key people: Wolfgang Gleissner (Managing Director); Hans-Peter Weiss (Managing Director)
- Revenue: 774 million EUR (2008)
- Operating income: 219 million EUR (2008)
- Net income: 42 million EUR (2008)
- Total assets: 4613 million EUR (2008)
- Total equity: 834 million EUR (2008)
- Owner: Republic of Austria (100%)
- Number of employees: 812 (2008)
- Subsidiaries: BIG Finanzdienstleistungen GMBH; BIG Entwicklungs-Und Verwertungs GMBH
- Website: big.at

Bundesimmobiliengesellschaft m.b.H or BIG is a quasi-governmental company in Austria, which manages Austrian publicly owned real estate. BIG is the central provider of space for several public sector functions such as schools, universities, prisons, courts and police stations. It rents out buildings to the government entities using them, carries out renovations and new investments, and handles sales of buildings and land no longer in use by the public sector.

== History ==
BIG was created by law in 1992, with the objective of centralizing property management for Austria's public sector. The federal real-estate property had previously been managed by the Federal Buildings Directorate Vienna (Bundesbaudirektion Wien) in the Vienna province, and in the other provinces by the Federal Buildings Administrations (Bundesgebäudeverwaltungen). The aim was to improve the cost-efficiency of various government departments. The underlying premise for this system of internal rent was that requiring departments to pay for and account for their usage of buildings would force them to rationalise their use of space and allow surplus space to be put to alternative use or sold.

== Organizational form ==
BIG is a legal entity of the form Gesellschaft mit beschränkter Haftung, shortly GmbH, which is a form of limited liability company. The sole owner of BIG is the Republic of Austria, and the company's activities cannot be considered separate from government policy. Any changes in ownership would require a prior amendment to the law by simple majority.

== Economy and market ==
Unlike other companies close to the Austrian government, BIG acts on the free real estate market, but its business activities are restricted to the Republic of Austria. The Austrian government is dependent on BIG, since it has a de facto monopoly on special-purpose buildings such as educational facilities and prisons. The Austrian government entities—such as ministries and universities—that rent these buildings, account for 98% of BIG:s rental income, Therefore, BIG and the Austrian public sector may be inferred to be in a bilateral monopoly situation with regard to special-purpose buildings. Rents are fixed on a market-like basis, though with adjustments for special-purpose buildings.

== Principal activities ==
BIG engages in:

- Rental of properties, particularly for federal schools, universities and official buildings.
- Construction of new buildings and redevelopment of old properties for rental to federal schools and universities, and as official buildings.
- Sales of buildings and land.
- Property management and maintenance of properties.
- Property development and sales of completed projects involving private use.
- Facility management, by agreement with tenants.
- Restitution, sale or compensation of certain properties looted from Jews under the Nazis and still owned by the Republic of Austria

== Real estate portfolio ==
In 2008, the book value of the real estate owned by BIG was approximately 4.15 billion EUR. The real estate portfolio consisted of:

- Schools and universities (70.5%)
- Prisons, police stations and court houses (27%)
- Residential property (2%)
- Other (0.5%)
