= Institute for Federal Real Estate (Germany) =

Federal government agency

- Bundesanstalt für Immobilienaufgaben

Agency overview
- Formed: January 1, 2005
- Preceding agency: Federal Property Administration (Bundesvermögensverwaltung)
- Jurisdiction: Government of Germany
- Headquarters: Ellerstraße 56; 53119 Bonn
- Employees: ≈ 6500
- Agency executives: Jürgen Gehb, Spokesman of the board; Gert Leis, Member of the board; Axel Kunze, Member of the board
- Parent agency: Federal Ministry of Finance
- Website: Bundesimmobilien.de

The Institute for Federal Real Estate (in German: Bundesanstalt für Immobilienaufgaben, abbreviated BImA) is a government agency in Germany that provides federal government entities with real estate services. It functions as a landlord in the government system of internal rent—a commercially based model for managing government real estate. The institute provides services such as renting space, facility management and real estate development. The institute itself owns a major proportion of the property it manages, and is one of the largest owners of real estate in Germany. It was estimated that within 2011, the Institute for Federal Real Estate would—due to property transfers—own and manage nearly all real estate used by the federal government of Germany.

The Institute for Federal Real Estate was established via law on January 1, 2005. It succeeded the Federal Property Administration (Bundesvermögensverwaltung), which was dismantled, and from which tasks and staff were transferred. At the same time, the Federal Forests Administration (Bundesforstverwaltung) was integrated into the institute as the federal forests division.

== Organization ==
The Institute for Federal Real Estate is a legal entity of the type Anstalt des öffentlichen Rechts, i.e. a public-law institute. It has approximately 5,800 employees at 120 different locations in Germany. The institute functions under the legal and supervisory control of the Federal Ministry of Finance. The top management consists of a 3-member board of directors, which is assisted by an advisory 10-member board of governors.

Organization

Federal Ministry of Finance (Legal and supervisory control)	Board of Governors (Advisory)
Board of Directors	Support functions
Facility Management	Organization / Human Resources	Federal Forests	Administrative Tasks	Information Technology	Finance	Portfolio Management	Sales

== Principal activities ==
Five of the nine divisions are responsible for the principal activities of the Institute for Federal Real Estate: facility management, federal forests, administrative tasks, portfolio management and sales.

=== Administrative tasks ===
The administrative tasks division provides various property-related services that are in the public interest. As Germany is a member of NATO, there are foreign military forces permanently stationed in the country, which require space for their activities. The administrative tasks division provides both these foreign forces and the federal armed forces (Bundeswehr) with suitable buildings and land, either through procurement or by leasing from other real estate owners. The division also provides federal civil servants with housing at market prices. For this purpose, the Institute for Federal Real Estate has around 100,000 residential housing units, either owned by the institute, or leased from a third party. In addition, the administrative tasks division handles legal matters related to the division of assets due to the German reunification. It also handles citizens' settlement claims for personal and property damage caused by the military exercises of foreign military forces stationed in Germany. In 2008, such compensation payments were estimated to amount to a total of 18 million EUR.

BImA has shifted from strong profit-orientation towards greater support of social and environmental goals in the 2010s, after being allowed to sell land to municipalities at lower than market value for public purposes in the federal budget plan.

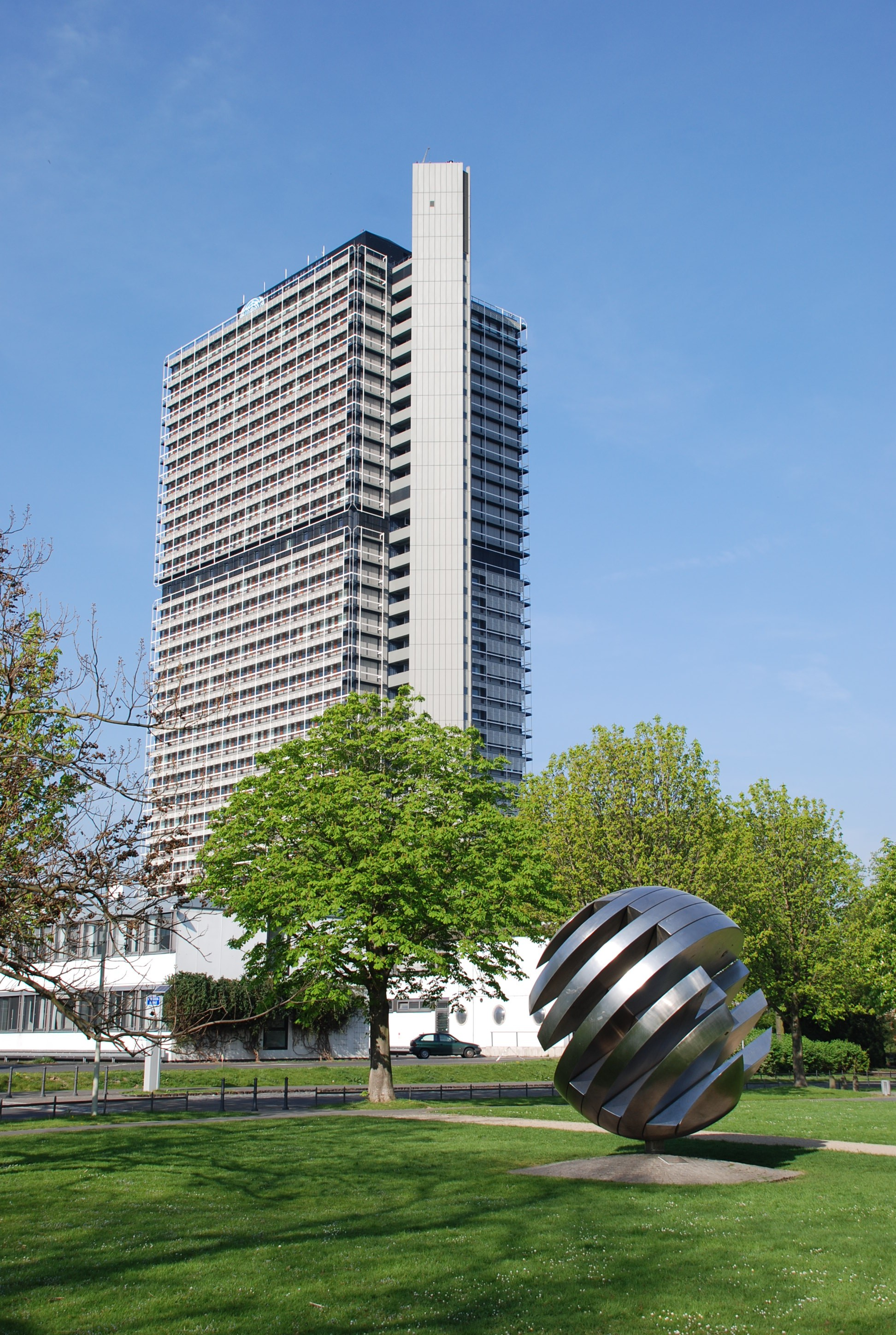
The United Nations campus Langer Eugen is one of the buildings owned by the Institute for Federal Real Estate.

=== Facility management ===
The facility management division procures, manages, and disposes of real estate on behalf of government entities. If the institute is unable to provide the real estate demanded by a government entity, it rents that required property from the private real estate market, and then sublets the property to the government entity. This makes the institute an intermediary between private sector real estate providers and the federal government.

The division's real estate management operations include renting, handling invoices for services, and executing construction projects. There is also leasing of residential and other real estate to the private sector, which provides approximately 25% of the total revenue of the Institute for Federal Real Estate. Such commercial real estate has typically had former military uses, for instance barracks. A nationwide SAP ERP-based real estate management system is used for the commercial activities.

=== Federal forests ===
The federal forests division manages and provides services related to woodland, open land and waterways owned by the federal government of Germany and by third parties. The land managed by the division is used for forestry, as nature reserves, and in part for agriculture. In 2008, the Federal Forests division managed forest areas covering 360,000 hectares and open land areas covering 247,000 hectares, which in total is approximately 1.7% of the area of Germany, making the Institute for Federal Real Estate one of the largest managers of land in Germany. Approximately half of this land is used by the federal armed forces (Bundeswehr), for instance as training areas, and as protective barriers for civilian population adjacent to military installations.

=== Portfolio management ===
The portfolio management division analyses the property assets of the Institute for Federal Real Estate, and is responsible for evaluating their economic viability. The division makes annual investment decisions, and also prepares a portfolio of sales. It adds economic value to the properties being sold through deciding on demolition, land parcellation, site development, and by obtaining building permits.

=== Sales ===
The sales division is responsible for commercially selling real estate that the federal government no longer requires. This includes residential property, commercial property, land, military installations and culturally significant buildings. The Institute for Federal Real Estate considers the division's specialty to be the marketing of military areas that have been used by the armed forces of Germany (Bundeswehr) and foreign military forces. The division's long-term aim is to dispose about 30,000 properties, by selling around 3,000 annually. The properties sold are often subject to follow-up investments, such as converting former military areas into residential estates and recreational facilities. The Institute for Federal Real Estate does not by itself engage in such real estate development, but rather works together with state authorities, local authorities and investors. The revenue generated by the sales division accounts for around 50% of the total revenue generated.

== Real estate stock ==
In 2005, the book value of the government real estate stock owned by the Institute for Federal Real Estate was approximately 10 billion euros. The total real estate stock included:

- 300,000 hectares of land
- 50,000 buildings

Examples of buildings and land partially or fully owned at some point in time by the Institute for Federal Real Estate include:

- Headquarters of the Federal Intelligence Service
- Berlin Tempelhof Airport
- Vogelsang Castle
- Langlütjen
- Heligoland
