= Swedish Fortifications Agency =

Swedish government agency

- Fortifikationsverket
- The coat of arms of the Swedish Fortifications Agency

Agency overview
- Formed: 1994
- Preceding agency: Fortifikationsförvaltningen (1948–1994)
- Jurisdiction: Government of Sweden
- Headquarters: Kungsgatan 43, 631 89 Eskilstuna
- Employees: 640
- Annual budget: Self-sufficient through fees. Revenue 3.0 billion SEK(2008)
- Minister responsible: Magdalena Andersson, Minister for Finance
- Agency executive: Maria Bredberg Pettersson, Director general
- Parent agency: Ministry of Finance
- Website: www.fortifikationsverket.se

The Swedish Fortifications Agency (Swedish: Fortifikationsverket, FortV) is a Swedish government agency under the Ministry of Finance, tasked with managing government-owned defence-related buildings and land. The agency functions as the landlord for the Swedish Armed Forces (Försvarsmakten), managing various types of military installations. The SFA is one of the largest holders of real estate in Sweden.

== Function in the government ==
The formation of the SFA in 1994 was part of the Swedish government effort to increase the cost-efficiency of government real estate usage through a system of internal rent, which was meant to emulate market-like conditions. The main purpose with the reform was to create economic incentives for the authorities in the public sector to economise on premises. In the defence sector, the real estate holdings were transferred from the Swedish Armed Forces — the user of the real estate — to the SFA; with the Swedish Armed Forces remaining in the estate as a tenant.

Currently, the SFA acts as landlord for several Swedish government agencies in the defence sector. The main tenant is the Swedish Armed Forces, which in 2007 was the source of over 90% of the SFA:s revenue.

== Economy ==
The SFA does not receive an allowance from the government budget. Instead, it covers its expenses by charging rent for the real estate it leases. In 2008, the agency's revenue was 3.0 billion SEK, and its net income 67 million SEK. The rent is adjusted so that the net income — which goes into the state treasury — conforms to a predefined level of return on equity, as set by the Ministry of Finance. To finance investments, the SFA borrows money from the National Debt Office (Riksgälden), which acts as the internal bank of the government.

== Personnel ==
The SFA employed 689 people in 2008. The majority of the employees work on a local level in real estate units linked to garrisons, where employees work in areas such as project management, property development and maintenance services. At the regional and national level, employees work in real estate purchasing and sales, defence facility development, and various management functions. The SFA considers its core competencies to be security and protective technology. The agency has stated that it aims to increase the amount of outsourcing, and as an experiment in 2006, it outsourced the property maintenance of two garrisons.

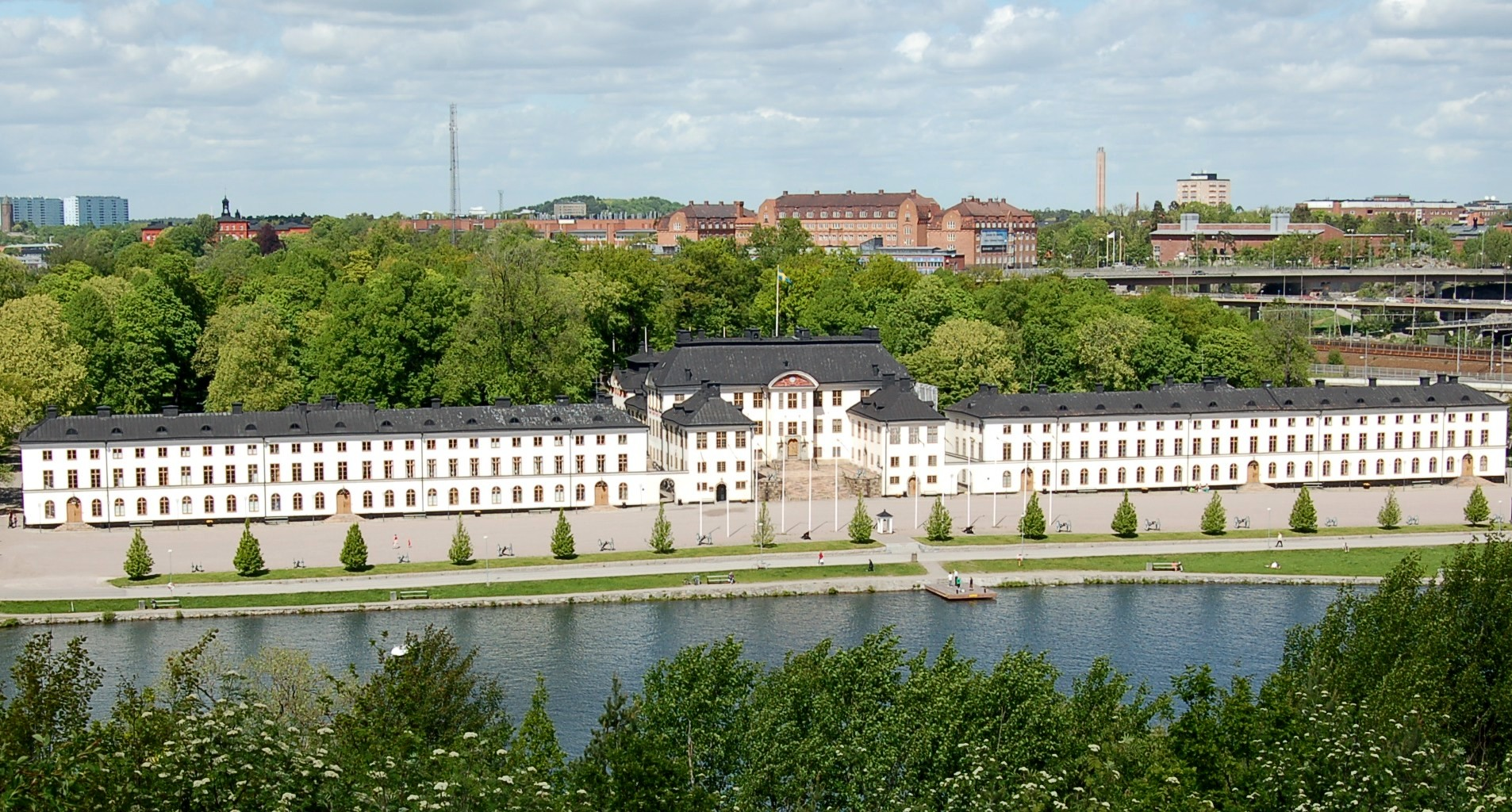
Karlberg Palace in Solna, Stockholm — which houses the Military Academy Karlberg — is one of the properties managed by the SFA.

== Real estate stock ==
In 2008, the book value of the government real estate stock managed by the SFA was 10.1 billion SEK, largely consisting of depots, garrisons, training facilities, offices, and proving grounds. In 2007, the total real estate stock included:

- 8 000 buildings
- 3.3 million square meters of open space facilities
- 7 700 defence facilities
- 11 airfields
- 380 000 hectares of land, including:
- 100 000 hectares of forest

== Directors General ==
=== Directors General of the Swedish Fortifications Administration ===
- 1948–1951: Nils Josef Einar Carlqvist
- 1951–1963: Gunnar Christianson
- 1963–1971: Birger Wallén
- 1971–1983: Stig Swanstein
- 1983–1989: Eric Pettersson
- 1989–1994-06-30: Björn Körlof

=== Directors General of the Swedish Fortifications Agency ===
- 1994-07-01 – 1999: Torsten Engberg
- 1999–2002: Jane Cederqvist
- 2003–2009: Sören Häggroth
- 2009-03-01 – 2011-12-31: Lena Jönsson
- 2012-01-01 – 2018: Urban Karlström
- 2018-04-09 – 20xx: Maria Bredberg Pettersson
