= Magnus Olson (Swedish Army officer) =

Swedish Army officer

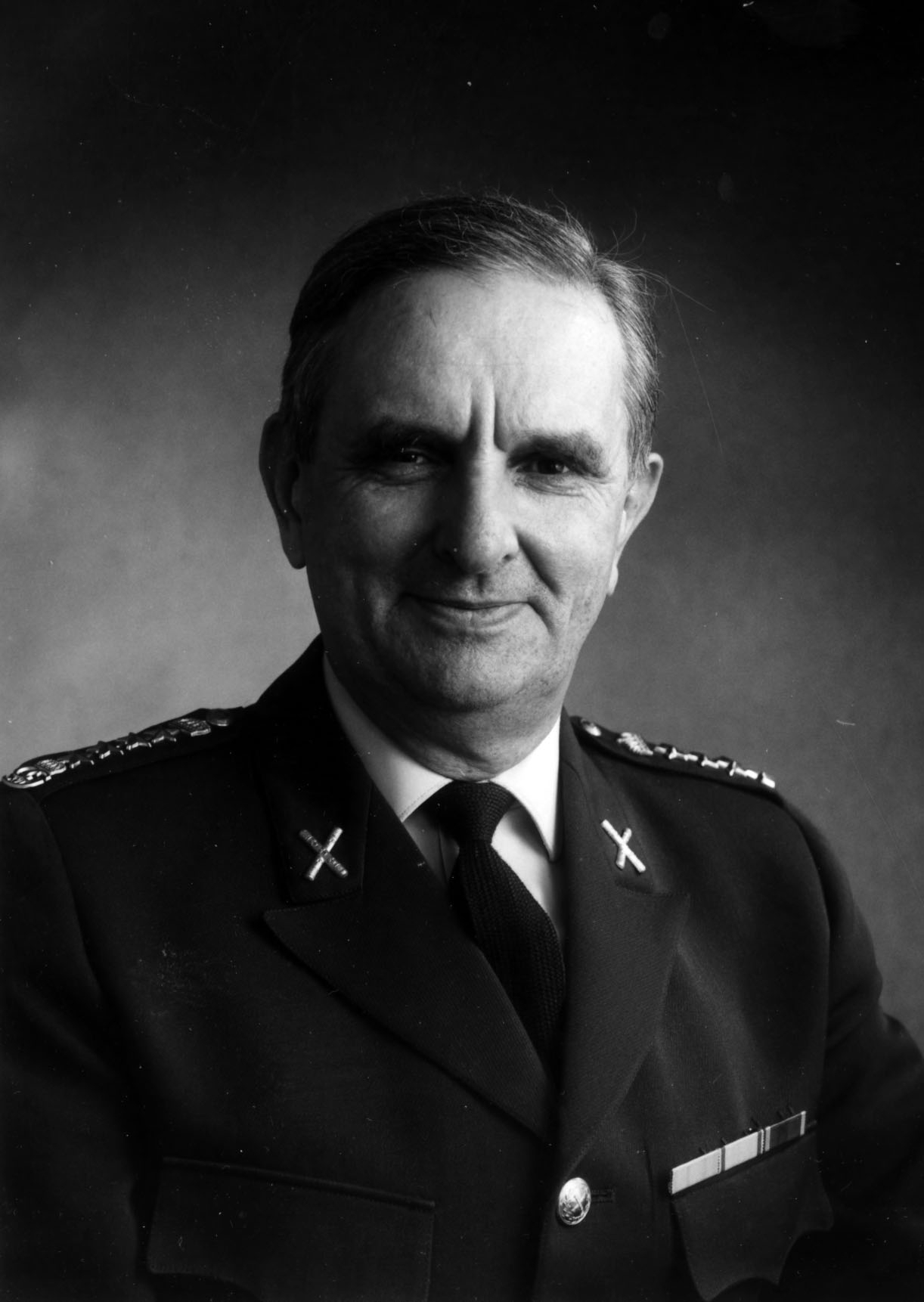
- Born: Anders Magnus Olson; 1 February 1929; Vänersnäs, Vänersborg Municipality, Sweden
- Died: 4 November 2018 (aged 89); Bäcks, Töreboda Municipality, Sweden
- Military career
- Allegiance: Sweden
- Branch: Swedish Army
- Service years: 1954–1990
- Rank: Senior Colonel
- Commands: Life Regiment Hussars; Chief of Staff, Milo V
- Other work: Crown Equerry

Senior Colonel Anders Magnus Olson (1 February 1929 – 4 November 2018) was a Swedish Army officer. Olson served as commander of the Life Regiment Hussars from 1976 to 1980, as Chief of Staff of the Western Military District from 1984 to 1988 and as Crown Equerry and head of the Royal Stables from 1991 to 1996.

== Career ==
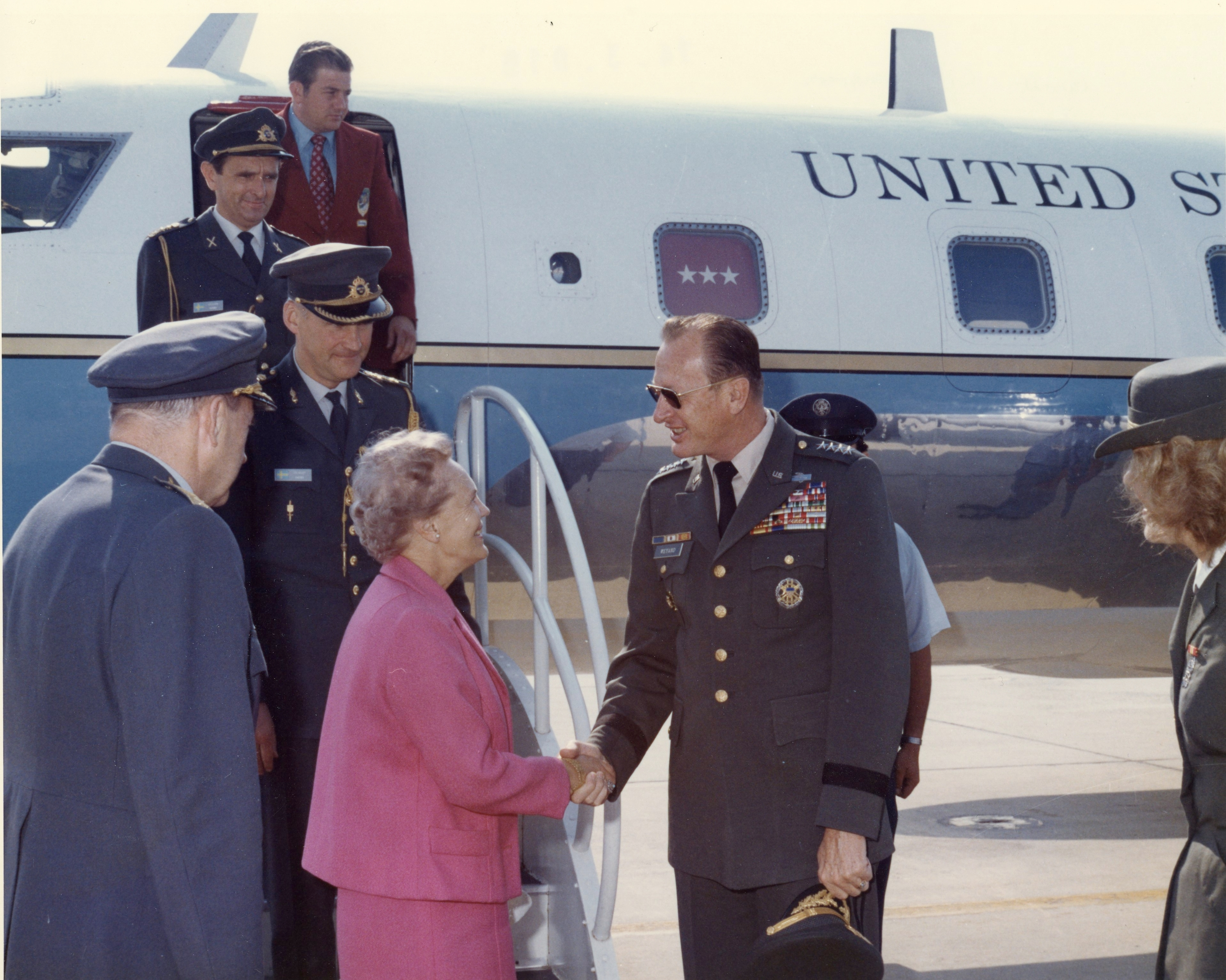
Olson (second at the top of the image) in the United States in 1975 together with Chief of the Army, Lieutenant General Carl Eric Almgren (left).

Olson was born on 1 February 1929 in Vänersnäs, Älvsborg County, Sweden, the son of Anders Olson, a farmer, and his wife Maria (née Andersson). Olson graduated from the Military Academy Karlberg in 1954 and was commissioned as an officer in the Life Regiment Hussars (K 3). He attended the Swedish Armed Forces Staff College from 1961 to 1963 and was promoted to ryttmästare in Life Regiment Hussars in 1965. The same year, Olsson was promoted to captain and was assigned to the Army Staff and attended British Staff College. Olson was promoted to Major in 1970 and served as a teacher at the Swedish Armed Forces Staff College from 1970 to 1973 and was promoted to Lieutenant Colonel in 1972.

Olson was appointed head of the Tactics and Intelligence Department in the Army Staff in 1973 and in 1975 he attended the general course at the Swedish National Defence College in 1975 (and its management course in 1984). In 1976, Olsson was appointed regimental commander of the Life Regiment Hussars (K 3) and the year after he was promoted to Colonel. After four years as regimental commander, Olson was appointed military attaché in Washington, D.C. in 1980. He then served as military district inspector of the Western Military District from 1983 to 1984 and as Chief of Staff of the Western Military District from 1984 to 1988. In 1988, Olson was assigned to the Supreme Commander of the Swedish Armed Forces and served as military advisor at the European Security Conference (ESC) negotiations in Vienna for two years. He retired from active service in 1990 and then served as Crown Equerry and head of the Royal Stables from 1991 to 1996.

Olson also served as chief aide-de-camp (överadjutant) to His Majesty the King.

== Personal life ==
In 1957, Olson married Margaret (Titti) von Hofsten (born 1933), the daughter of Erland von Hofsten and Ebba (née Sörensen).

== Death ==
Olson died on 4 November 2018 at Borrud seat farm in Bäcks socken, Töreboda Municipality. His funeral was held in Bäcks Church on 23 November 2018.

== Dates of rank ==
- 1954 – Second lieutenant
- 1965 – Ryttmästare
- 1965 – Captain
- 1970 – Major
- 1972 – Lieutenant colonel
- 1977 – Colonel
- 1984 – Senior colonel

== Awards and decorations ==
- (Sweden) H. M. The King's Medal, 12th size gold (silver-gilt) medal worn around the neck on the Order of the Seraphim ribbon (1996)
- (Sweden) Knight 1st Class of the Order of the Sword (6 June 1972)
- (United States) Officer of the Legion of Merit (15 November 1984)
- (Estonia) Second Class of the Order of the White Star (11 September 1995)

Military offices
Preceded by Gustaf Malmström	Life Regiment Hussars; 1991–1996	Succeeded by Arne Håkansson
Preceded by Torsten Engberg	Chief of Staff of the Western Military District; 1984–1988	Succeeded by Nils Rosenqvist
Court offices
Preceded by Hodder Stjernswärd	Crown Equerry; 2003–2015	Succeeded by Jörn Beckmann
