= Torsten Engberg =

Swedish Coastal Artillery officer (1934–2018)

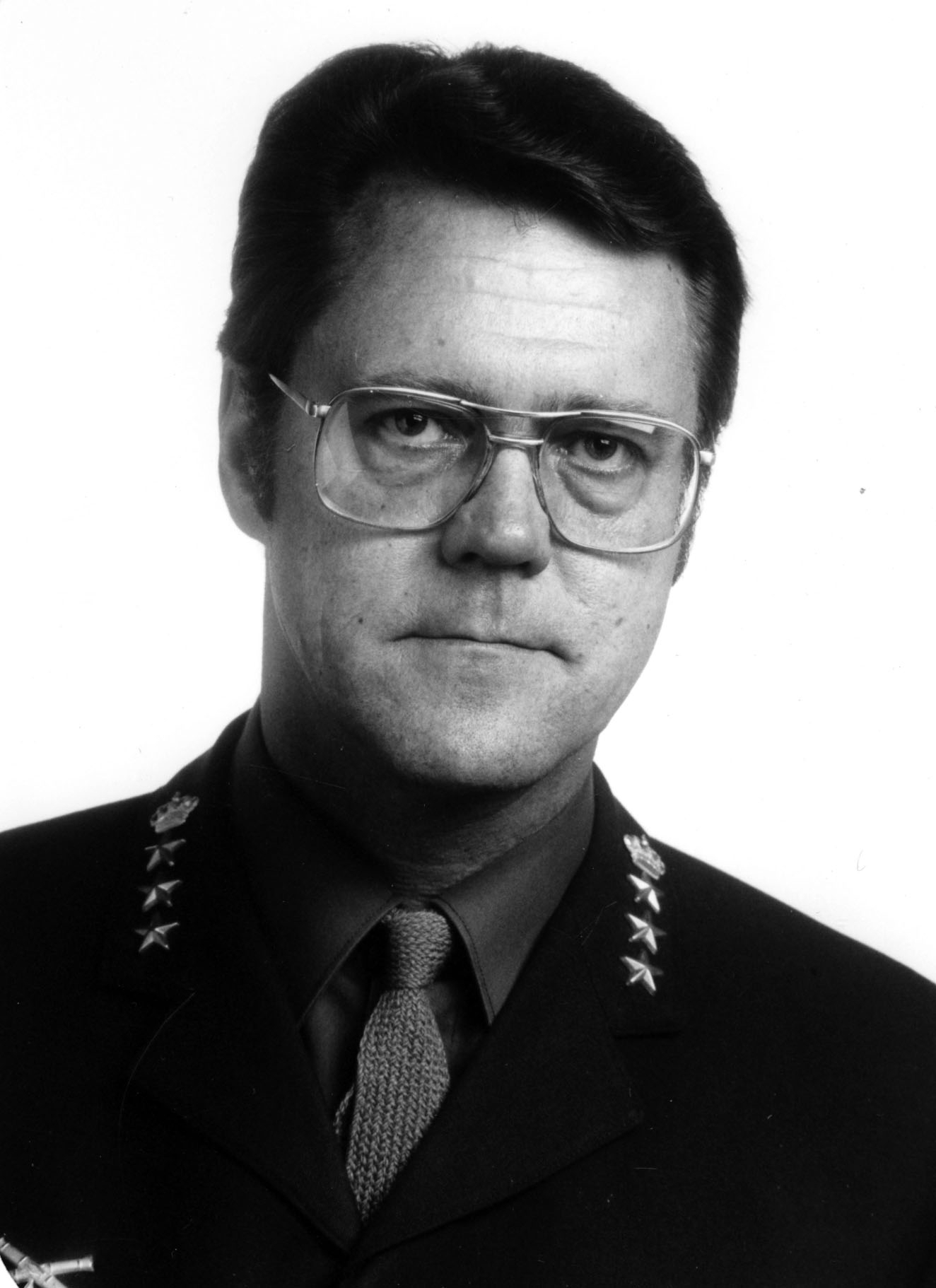
- Engberg as colonel (1980–1982).
- Born: Torsten Reinhold Engberg; 28 May 1934; Norrfjärden, Sweden
- Died: 7 February 2018 (aged 83); Simrishamn, Sweden
- Military career
- Allegiance: Sweden
- Branch: Coastal Artillery (Swedish Navy)
- Service years: 1956–1994
- Rank: Lieutenant General
- Commands: Chief of Staff, Western Military District; Chief of the Naval Staff; Chief of the Defence Staff; Middle Military District; Commandant General in Stockholm
- Other work: DG of Swedish Fortifications Agency

Lieutenant General Torsten Reinhold Engberg (28 May 1934 – 7 February 2018) was a senior Swedish Coastal Artillery officer. Engberg was Chief of the Naval Staff from 1984 to 1987 and Chief of the Defence Staff from 1987 to 1991 as well as military commander of the Middle Military District (Milo M) from 1991 to 1994. He also served as the first director general of the Swedish Fortifications Agency from 1994 to 1999.

== Early life ==
Engberg was born on 28 May 1934 in Norrfjärden Parish, Norrbotten County, Sweden, the son of Amandus Engberg and his wife Märta (née Johansson). He passed studentexamen in 1957. He was selected for conscription in Norrbotten Regiment (I 19) in Boden but wanted to join the Swedish Coastal Artillery and began his training in Karlskrona Coastal Artillery Regiment (KA 2) in Karlskrona.

== Career ==
Engberg graduated from the Royal Swedish Naval Academy in 1959 and was commissioned as an officer the same year and was assigned as a second lieutenant to Vaxholm Coastal Artillery Regiment (KA 1). There, he participated early on in raising the new light missile units. Engberg served in the Naval Staff from 1964 to 1965 and attended the Swedish Armed Forces Staff College from 1966 to 1968. He served in the Defence Staff in 1968 and the year after he served in the staff of the Eastern Military District (Milo Ö). On 1 October 1971, Engberg was promoted to major and served in the Defence Staff and the year after he was promoted to lieutenant colonel. He then served as commanding officer of the Coastal Ranger School in Vaxholm from 1974 to 1976. He was deputy section chief in the Defence Staff from 1976 to 1980 and in 1979 he underwent a course for senior unit commanders in the planning and implementation of amphibious operations at the Naval Amphibious School in United States.

Engberg was promoted to colonel and appointed commanding officer of the Gotland Coastal Artillery Defence (KA 3) on 1 October 1980. He was promoted to senior colonel in 1982 and was appointed Chief of Staff of the Western Military District (Milo V) in Skövde. In 1984, Engberg attended the Naval Postgraduate School in the United States and back in Sweden he was appointed Chief of the Naval Staff and promoted to major general on 1 April 1984. On 1 April 1987, Engberg was promoted to lieutenant general and appointed Chief of the Defence Staff. In Commander Hans von Hofsten's memoirs I kamp mot överheten ("In Battle Against the Authority"), Enberg is accused of filtering out sensitive information in the submarine reports regarding foreign submarines in Swedish waters, and of withholding important facts from the Supreme Commander, General Bengt Gustafsson and the Social Democratic government. The result was abandoned submarine hunts and a low political profile towards the Soviet Union. Engberg commented on the allegations as "sad speculations" from von Hofsten's side.

On 1 July 1991, Engberg was appointed military commander of the Middle Military District (Milo M). At the same time he served as the Commandant General in Stockholm. He served in this position until 1994. He then served as the first director general of the Swedish Fortifications Agency from 1 July 1994 to 1999. The agency was undergoing reorganization and received new tasks both for the Swedish Armed Forces and abroad, among other things he led the creation of protected, underground oil storage facilities in countries in the Middle East where the experience from the Swedish Total Defence came in handy.

== Personal life ==
In 1962, Engberg married Gun Zander (born 1941), the daughter of Hjalmar Zander and Elizabeth (née Persson). They had two children: Anna and Henrik.

== Death ==
Engberg died on 7 February 2018 in Simrishamn. The funeral service was held on 2 March 2018 in Saint Clement Chapel in Simrishamn.

== Dates of rank ==
- 1959 – Second lieutenant
- 19?? – Lieutenant
- 19?? – Captain
- 1 October 1971 – Major
- 1972 – Lieutenant colonel
- 1 October 1980 – Colonel
- 1982 – Senior colonel
- 1 April 1984 – Major general
- 1 April 1987 – Lieutenant general

== Awards and decorations ==
- (Norway) Grand Cross of the Royal Norwegian Order of Merit (1 July 1992)

== Honours ==
- Member of the Royal Swedish Academy of War Sciences
- Member of the Royal Swedish Society of Naval Sciences (1979)

Military offices
Preceded by Jan Enquist	Chief of Staff of the Western Military District; 1982–1984	Succeeded by Magnus Olson
Preceded by Bo Varenius	Chief of the Naval Staff; 1984–1987	Succeeded by Lars G. Persson
Preceded by Bror Stefenson	Chief of the Defence Staff; 1987–1991	Succeeded by Owe Wiktorin
Preceded by None	Middle Military District (Milo M); 1991–1994	Succeeded by Dick Börjesson
Preceded by Bror Stefenson	Commandant General in Stockholm; 1991–1994	Succeeded by Dick Börjesson
Government offices
Preceded by Björn Körlof	Director general of the Swedish Fortifications Agency; 1994–1999	Succeeded by Jane Cederqvist
