= Crown Equerry (Sweden) =

Title of the head of the Swedish Royal Stables

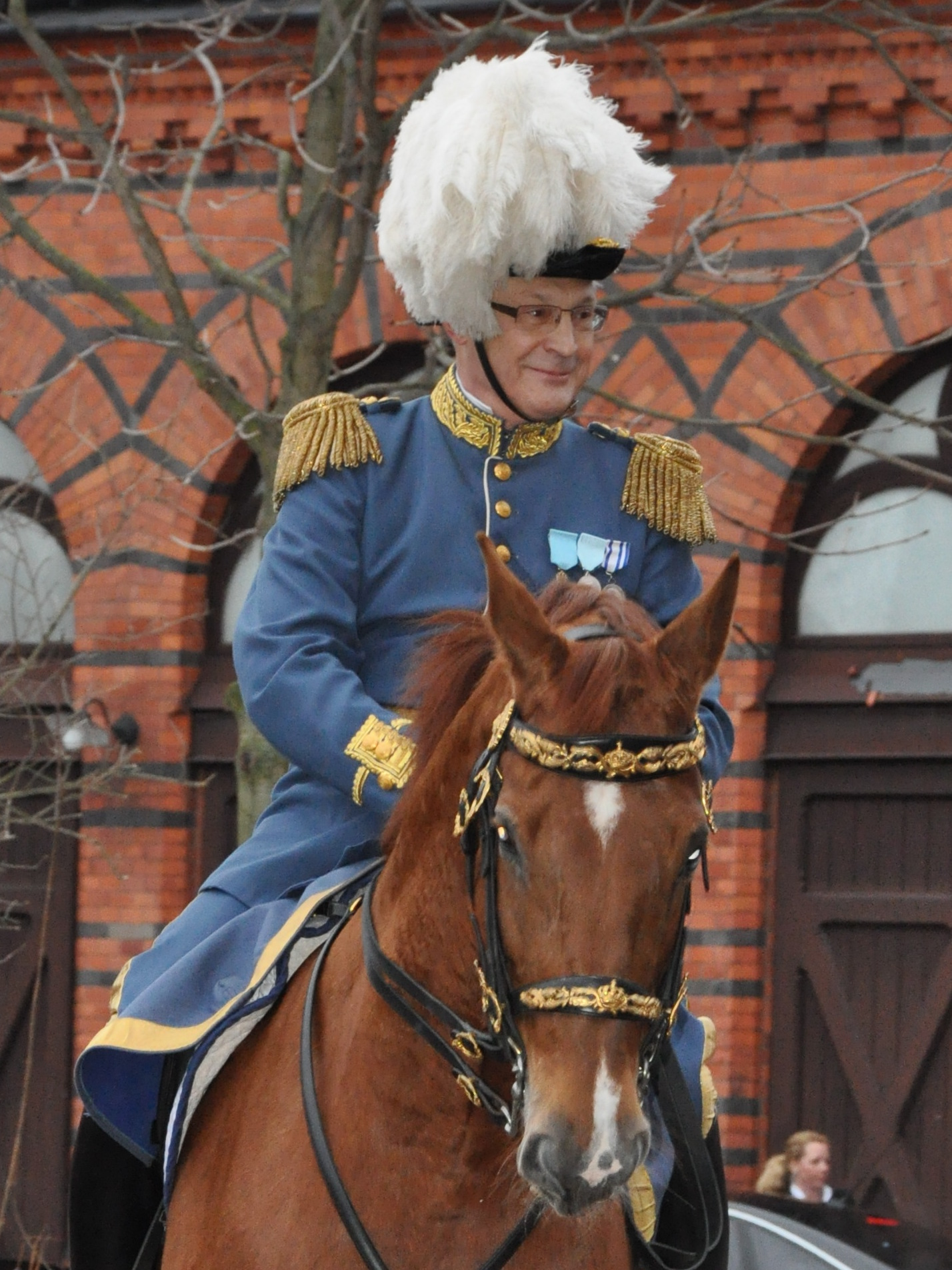
Crown Equerry Mertil Melin at the Estonian President Toomas Hendrik Ilves state visit to Stockholm in 2011.

Crown Equerry (Swedish: Hovstallmästare) is a title of the head of the Swedish Royal Stables. It is also an honorary title awarded by the king of Sweden. Previously at the Royal Court there was also a Master of the Horse (Swedish: Överhovstallmästare) who had the highest oversight of the Royal Stables. The Crown Equerry who was head of the Royal Stables, was named First Crown Equerry (Swedish: Förste hovstallmästare). Today Colonel Ulf Gunnehed is the Crown Equerry and head of the Royal Stables.

== Order of precedence ==
According to the order of precedence the Crown Equerry had following ranks before 1909:

English title	Swedish title	Military rank
Master of the Horse	Överhovstallmästare	Field Marshal
First Crown Equerry	Förste hovstallmästare	Lieutenant General
Crown Equerry	Hovstallmästare	Major General
Equerry at the Court	Stallmästaren vid hovet	Colonel
Deputy Master of Horse	Understallmästare	Major

== Uniform ==
Since 1875 the Crown Equerry carry a uniform consisting of a light blue single-breasted waffenrock with white piping and a stand-up collar decorated with oak leaf pattern. The parade uniform has epaulettes, a waist belt with gold tassels, and bicorne with white plume.

Hat for everyday attire.

Everyday attire.

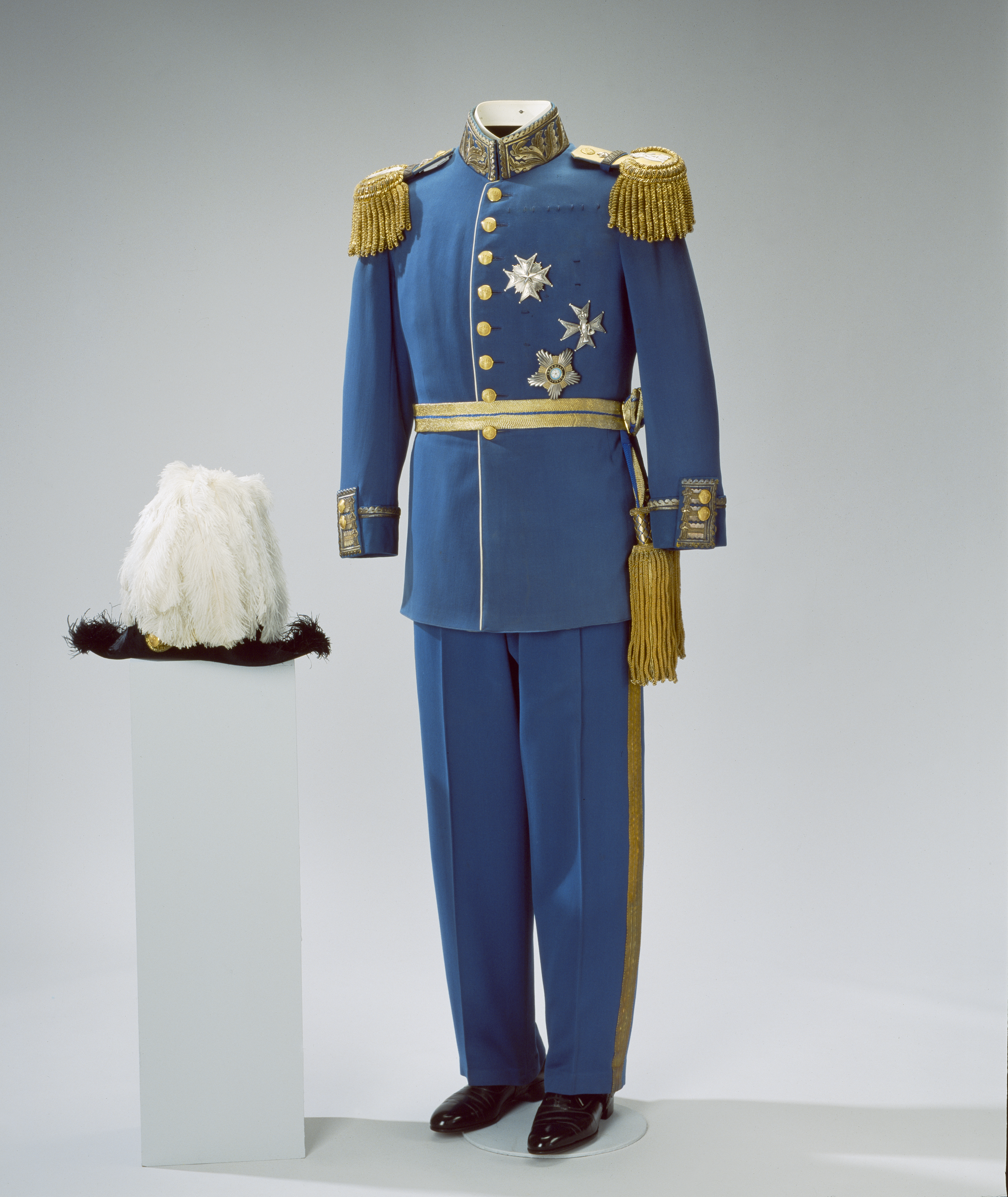
Parade attire.

== List of Crown Equerries ==
=== First Crown Equerries ===
This is an incomplete list of First Crown Equerries:

- 1886–1912: Gustaf Gyldenstolpe
- 1912–1929: Eberhard Rosenblad (1911)
- 1929–1950: Charles d’Otrante
- 1950–1972: Carl Eric von Platen

=== Crown Equerries ===
- 1972–1984: Hans Skiöldebrand
- 1984–1991: Hodder Stjernswärd
- 1991–1996: Magnus Olson
- 1996–2003: Jörn Beckmann
- 2003–2015: Mertil Melin
- 2015–2023: Ulf Gunnehed
- 2023– : Håkan Hedlund

== List of non court-serving Crown Equerries ==
This is an incomplete list of non court-serving First Crown Equerries and Crown Equerries:

=== Non court-serving First Crown Equerries ===
- 1890–1910: Gustaf d’Otrante
- 1918–1939: Edvard Sager
- 1918–1935: Carl Wachtmeister
- 1925–1937: Carl Gustaf von Platen

=== Non court-serving Crown Equerries ===
- 1896–1918: Edvard Sager
- 1901–1931: Gösta Tamm
- 1908–1918: Carl Wachtmeister
- 1911–1925: Carl Gustaf von Platen
- 1916–19??: Clarence von Rosen
- 1916–????: Carl Bonde
- 1923–1936: Adolf Hamilton
- 1927–1934: Carl Hallenborg
- 1930–1938: Magnus Palmstierna
- 1930–19??: Carl-Philip Klingspor
- 1931–1943: Fabian Wrede
- 1932–19??: Wilhelm von Essen
- 1933–19??: Claës Wachtmeister
- 1933–1941: Nils Gyllenkrok
- 1935–1946: Claës König
- 1946–1950: Hodder Stjernswärd

== See also ==
- Master of the Horse
