= Master of the Horse (Sweden) =

Position of the Royal Court of Sweden

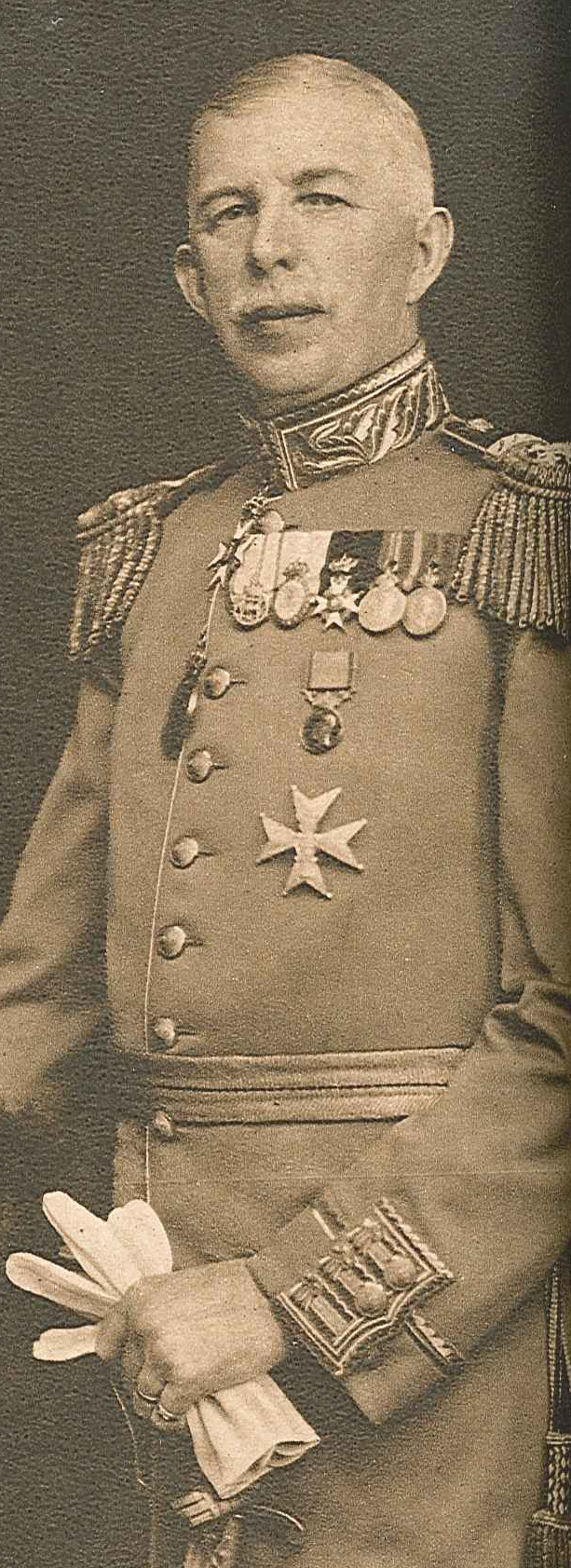
Hans Ramel, Master of the Horse from 1932 to 1957.

Master of the Horse (Swedish: Överhovstallmästare) was a court clerk, who held one of the foremost rankings of the Royal Court of Sweden (next to the Överstekammarherren and just before the Överhovjägmästaren). He had the highest oversight of the Royal Stables, but this was governed by the First Crown Equerry, and he was for a time head of the state stud farm service in Sweden, thereby succeeding the former Riksstallmästaren in some of his duties.

Two such offices were occupied by the Royal Court in 1729, and appear to have been re-instated in 1763. During the period 1774–1792, the corresponding court official also worked at the Queen's Court and 1774–1782 and 1792–1795 at the Queen dowager's Court. "Överhovstallmästare" also appeared as a title with no corresponding office.

The office was abolished at the end of 1969.

== List ==
- 1729–????: Carl Gustaf Güntherfelt
- 1763–1769: Johan Henrik Sparfvenfeldt
- 1769–1772: Jakob Wattrang
- 1772–1791: Adolf Fredrik Lewenhaupt
- 1791–1818: Gustaf Lewenhaupt
- 1818–1826: Claes Rålamb
- 1826–1826: Magnus Brahe
- 1826–1856: ?
- 1856–1859: Ferdinand Braunerhielm
- 1860–1874: Gustaf Adolf Fredrik Wilhelm von Essen
- 1875–1885: Rudolf Tornérhjelm
- 1886–1888: Carl Magnus Björnstjerna
- 1888–1908: Alfred Piper
- 1908–1912: Gustaf Gyldenstolpe
- 1912–1931: Fredrik Wrangel
- 1932–1957: Hans Ramel

== See also ==
- Crown Equerry
