= Jane Cederqvist =

Swedish swimmer (1945–2023)

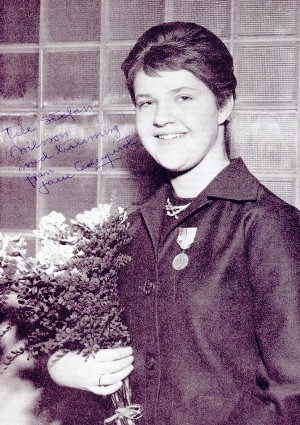
- Cederqvist, circa 1960

Personal information
- Full name: Jane Barbro Iréne Cederqvist
- National team: Sweden
- Born: 1 July 1945 Stockholm, Sweden
- Died: 15 January 2023 (aged 77) Stockholm, Sweden
- Height: 1.72 m (5 ft 8 in)
- Weight: 62 kg (137 lb)

Sport
- Sport: Swimming
- Strokes: Freestyle
- Club: SK Neptun
Medal record
Women's swimming
Representing Sweden
Olympic Games
Silver medal – second place	1960 Rome	400 m freestyle

Jane Barbro Iréne Cederqvist (1 July 1945 – 15 January 2023) was a Swedish freestyle swimmer. In 1960, she set two world records, won a silver medal at the 1960 Summer Olympics, and became the youngest person and the first woman to receive the Svenska Dagbladet Gold Medal. The following year she retired from swimming and later became a government official.

== Biography ==
Cederqvist grew up in the suburbs of Stockholm. She learned to swim at age 6, and at age 12 started training in a club. Within a few years she became a world top freestyle swimmer, and won a bronze medal at the 1958 Swedish Junior Swimming Championships. She finished second in the 400 m freestyle at the 1960 Summer Olympics in Rome, and a few days later set a new world record in the 1500 m freestyle in Sweden. Just before the games she broke another world record, in the 800 m freestyle. Cederqvist represented SK Neptun.

In 1961 she quit swimming to focus on her studies. In 1970 she received her BA and in 1980 a PhD in history with a thesis titled Arbetare i strejk: studier rörande arbetarnas politiska mobilisering under industrialismens genombrott: Stockholm 1850–1909 (Workers on Strike: The Political Mobilisation of the Working Class in Stockholm 1850–1909). She then took various jobs for central and local governments, such as department director at the Swedish National Audit Office for six years and then director of the Association of Local Authorities. From 1994, she worked at the Ministry of Industry, and in 1998 became director of the Swedish Museum of National Antiquities. Cederqvist had long wanted to become directly involved with history and was first excited with this job, but later became frustrated with the lack of funds and moved to the Ministry of Finance, where between 1999 and 2002 she acted as director-general of the Swedish Fortifications Agency and then worked as a tax analyst.

Cederqvist died after suffering from motor neurone disease on 15 January 2023, at the age of 77.

== See also ==
- World record progression 800 metres freestyle
- World record progression 1500 metres freestyle

Records
Preceded by Ilsa Konrads	Women's 1500 metres freestyle world record holder (long course); 8 September 1960 – 27 June 1961	Succeeded by Margareta Rylander
Awards
Preceded by Agne Simonsson	Svenska Dagbladet Gold Medal; 1960	Succeeded by Ove Fundin and Sten Lundin
Government offices
Preceded by Torsten Engberg	Director General of the Swedish Fortifications Agency; 1999–2002	Succeeded by Sören Häggroth
