= Hofjægermester =

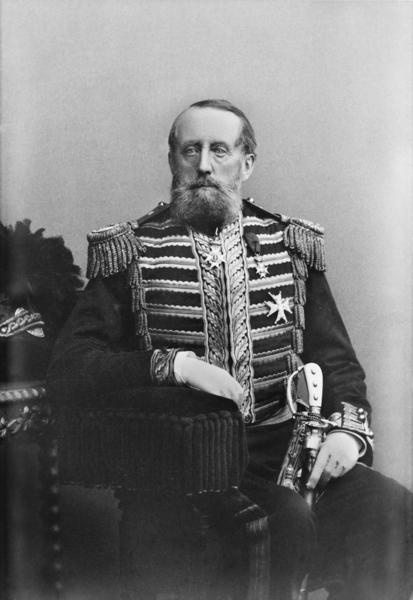
Herman Wedel-Jarlsberg, Hofjægermester at the royal court of Norway, appointed 1860

Hofjægermester (hunting master of the court) is an honorary court title awarded to a limited number of (major and usually noble) land owners (godsejere) by the Danish monarch. The title was introduced in Denmark-Norway during the period of absolute monarchy. Today, it's solely an honorary title. As of 1 March 2019, 52 persons hold the title in Denmark whereof 42 are men and 10 are women. The title was also used during the Swedish-Norwegian Union, but its use was discontinued in Sweden and Norway.

In Norway, the title was spelled Hofjægermester when the title was used (until 1905), although the modern spelling would be hoffjegermester. The Swedish spelling is hovjägmästare.

== See also ==
- Hovjägmästare
- Danish nobility
- Swedish nobility
- Norwegian nobility
