= Fritz Eckert =

Swedish architect

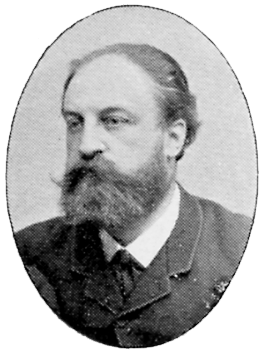
- Eckert in 1901
- Born: Fritz Herman Vilhelm Eckert; 25 April 1852; Stockholm, Sweden
- Died: 6 March 1920 (aged 67); Oscar Parish, Stockholm, Sweden
- Burial place: Norra begravningsplatsen
- Education: Royal Swedish Academy of Fine Arts
- Occupation: Architect
- Employer: Royal Institute of Technology
- Spouse: Ellen Hörlin (m. 1881)

Signature
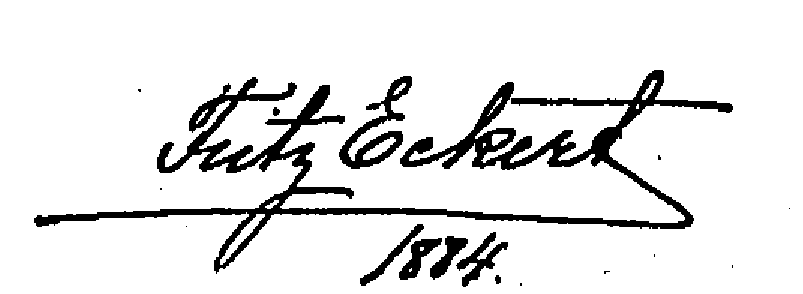

Fritz Herman Vilhelm Eckert (25 April 1852 - 6 March 1920) was a Swedish architect.

== Biography ==
Fritz Herman Vilhelm Eckert was born in Stockholm, Sweden. He attended the Royal Swedish Academy of Arts from 1871 to 1878 and spent 1879 travelling abroad. He was employed as an architect by the Swedish public construction service (Överintendentsämbetet) in 1878 and was made a curator of this service in 1904. From 1880 he lectured at the Stockholm-based KTH Royal Institute of Technology.

Eckert designed Curmanska Villan at Floragatan (1880), Royal Stables in Stockholm (1895), Antuna Gård in Upplands Väsby (1881), YWCA building in Stockholm (1905) and the Mariestad City Library (1895–96) as well as contributing to numerous church restorations.

== Gallery ==
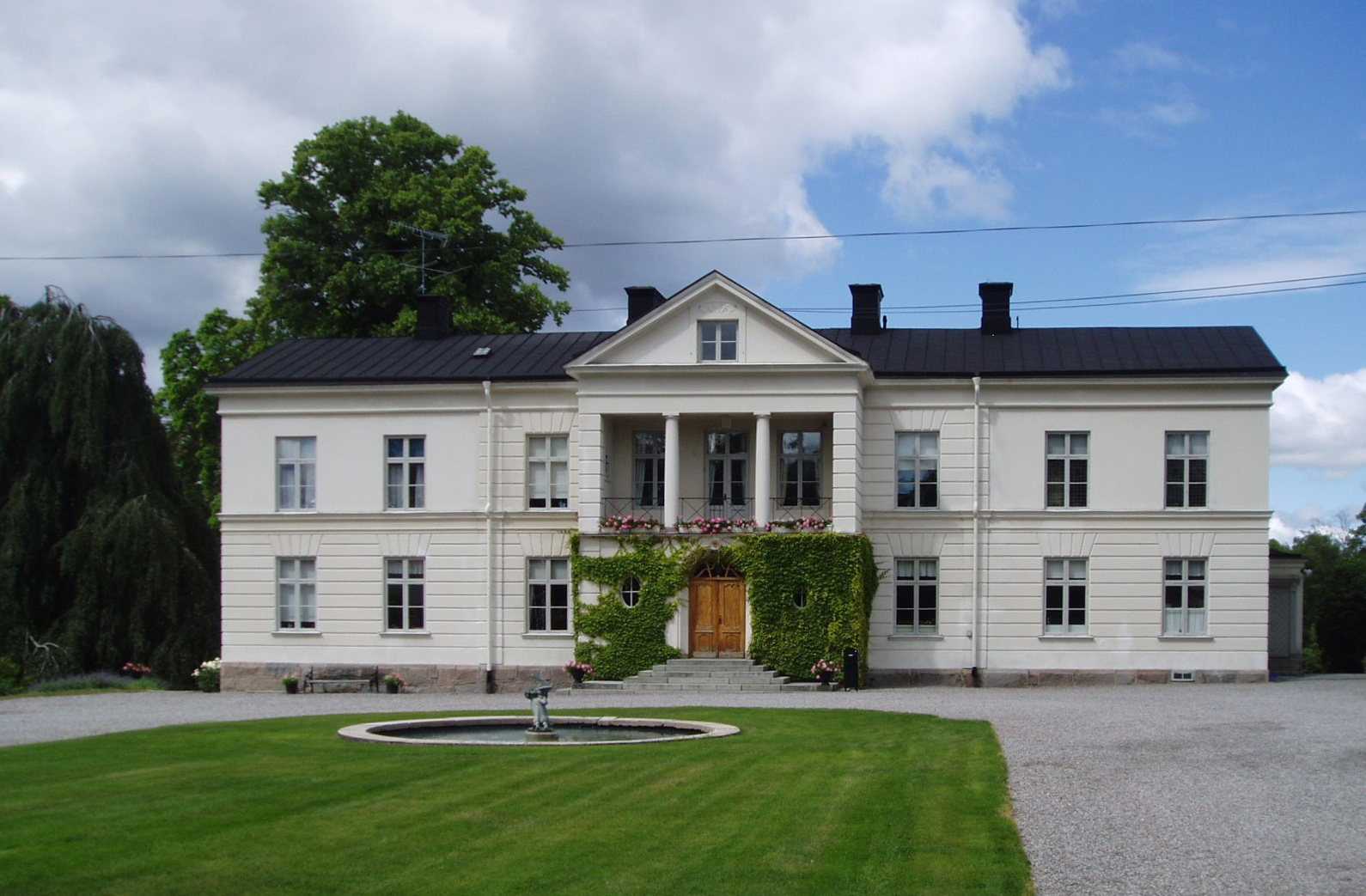
Antuna Gård (1881)

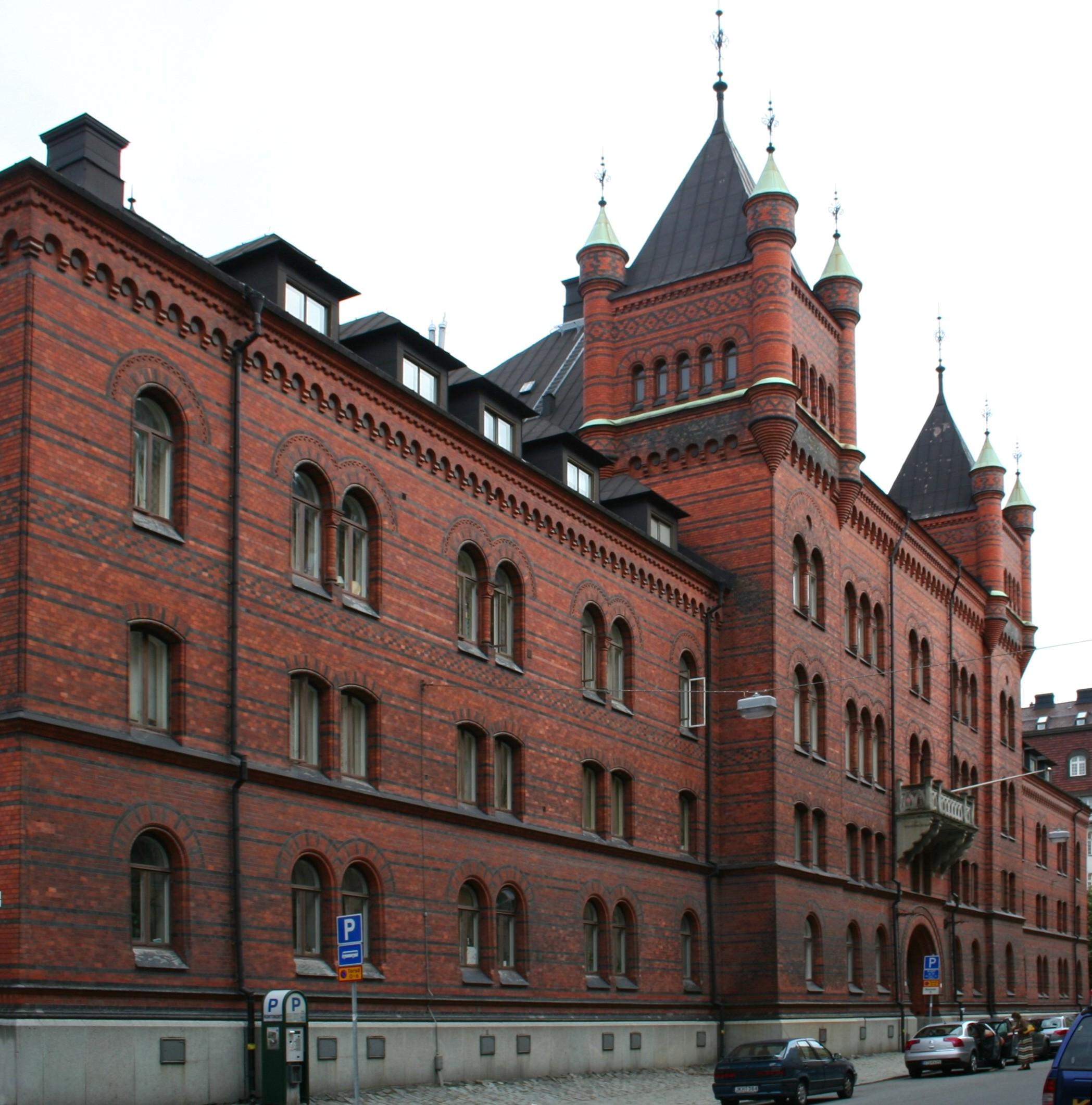
Royal Stables (1895)

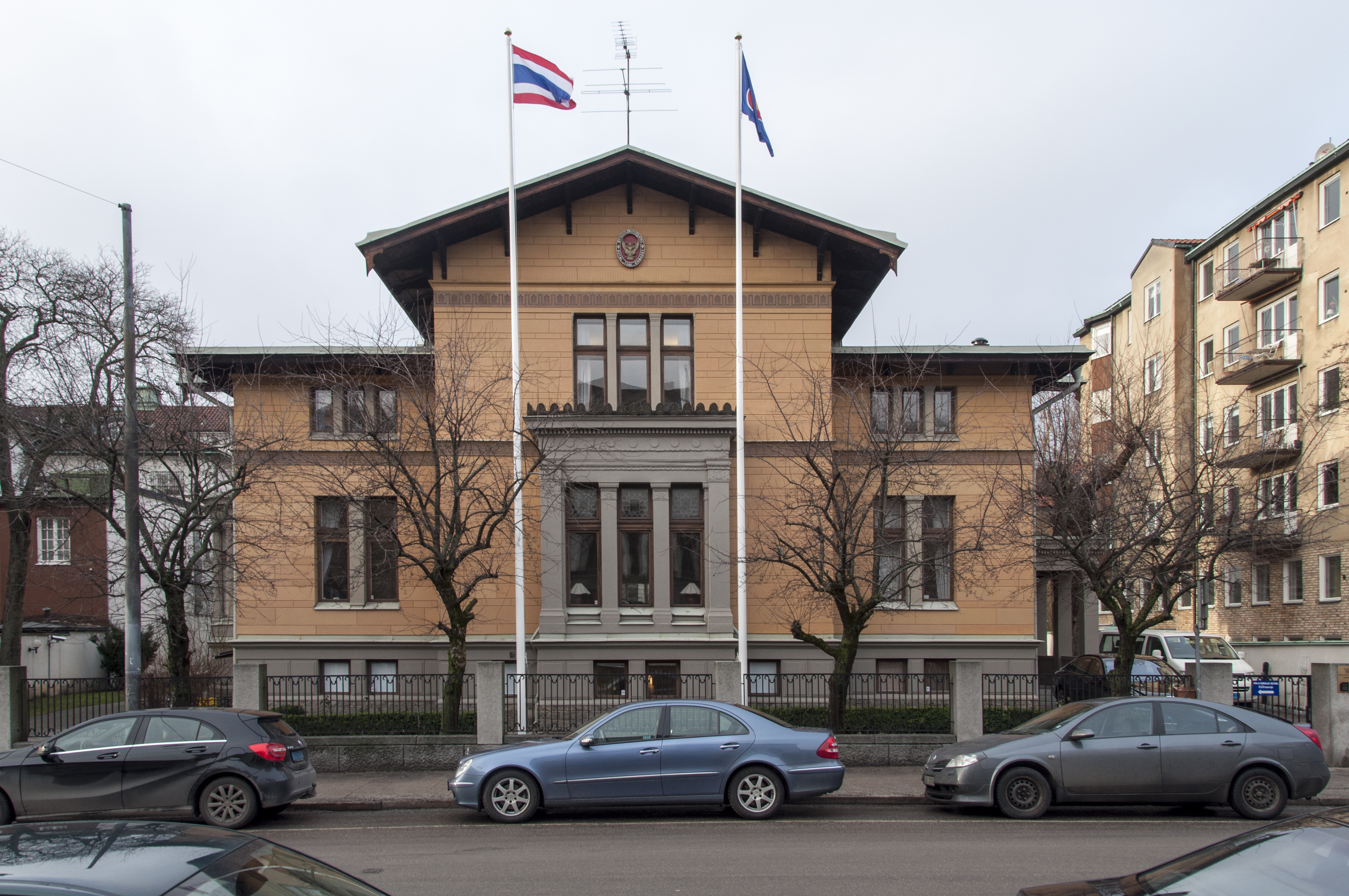
Curmanska Villan (1880)

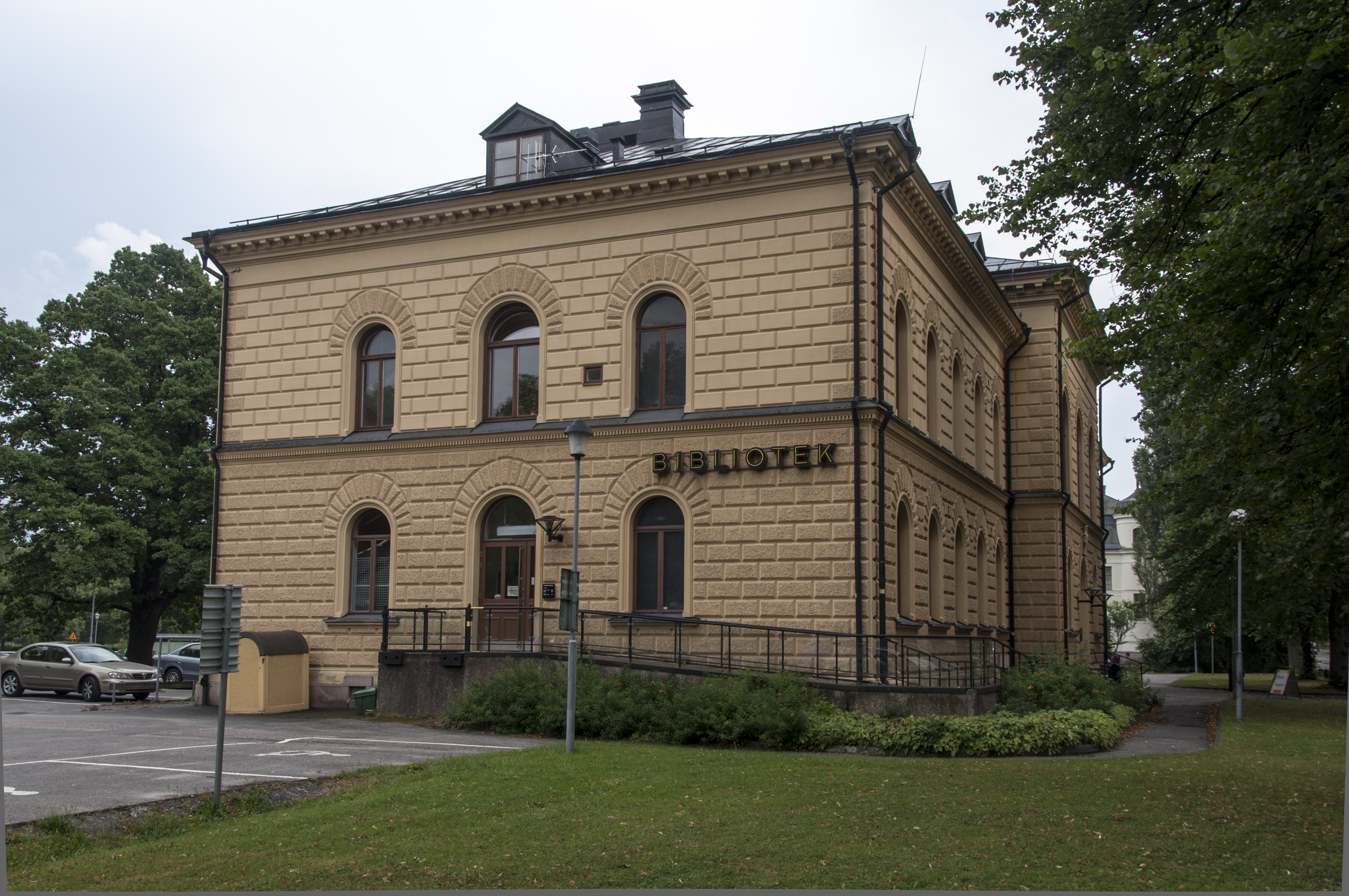
Mariestad City Library (1895–96)
