= Wilhelm von Essen =

Swedish equestrian (1879–1972)

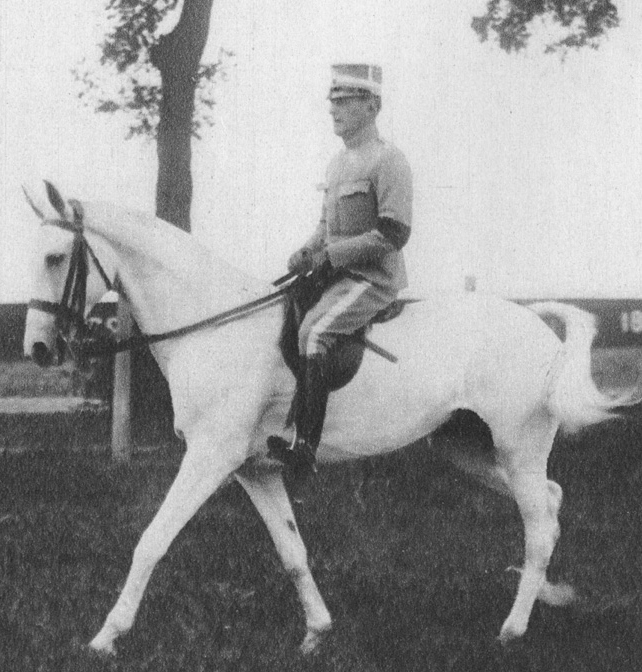

Personal information
- Born: 16 February 1879 Hömb, Tidaholm, Sweden
- Died: 10 April 1972 (aged 93) Åkers Runö, Österåker, Sweden

Sport
- Sport: Horse riding
- Club: K1 IF, Stockholm

Fritz Wilhelm von Essen (16 February 1879 – 10 April 1972) Baron and master of the royal stable, was a Swedish horse rider. He competed in the individual mixed dressage at the 1920 and 1924 Summer Olympics and placed fourth on both occasions.
