= Norrfjärden =

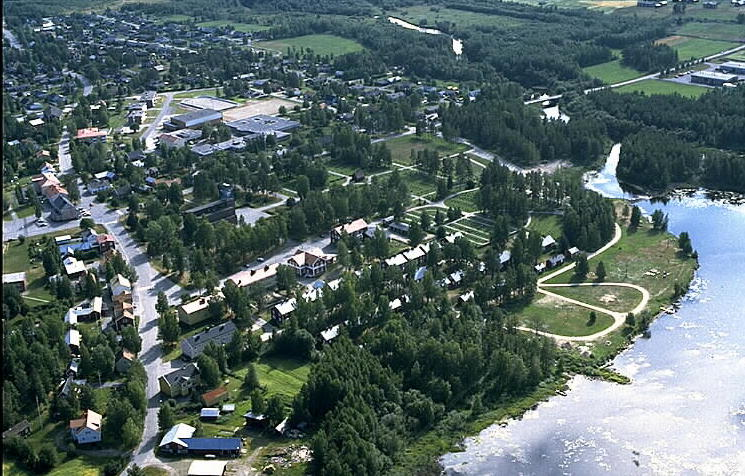

- Location within Norrbotten Location within Sweden
- Coordinates: 65°25′N 21°27′E
- Country: Sweden
- Province: Norrbotten
- County: Norrbotten County
- Municipality: Piteå Municipality

Area
  - Total: 1.89 km^{2} (0.73 sq mi)

Population (31 December 2010)
  - Total: 1,362
  - Density: 720/km^{2} (1,900/sq mi)
- Time zone: UTC+1 (CET)
  - Summer (DST): UTC+2 (CEST)

Norrfjärden is a locality situated in Piteå Municipality, Norrbotten County, Sweden with 1,362 inhabitants in 2010.
