= Hovjägmästare =

Waffenrock for hovjägmästare, 1960s.

Hovjägmästare in Sweden was a court official who supervised the Kungliga Hovjägeristaten at the Royal Court of Sweden and the royal hunting parks. The first hovjägmästare was originally the title of the head of the Kungliga Hovjägeristaten and later the title of any among the hovjägmästare. Today there is a hovjägmästare at the Royal Court of Sweden with the task of assisting in the planning of royal hunts. Hovjägmästare can be translated as Master of the Chase or Master of the Buckhounds and Överhovjägmästare can be translated as Grand Master of the Huntsmen.

Hovjägmästare in Sweden has a uniform (equivalent to court uniform) consisting of a single row waffenrock of dark green cloth with gold galloon on the collar and cuffs, gilded buttons with the royal crown and the colonel's epaulettes (older model) with the head of state monogram; dark green trousers with gold galloon; gold belt with fringes; hirschfänger or sabre; white gloves and black bicorne with cockade and a green hanging plume. Överhovjägmästare and first hovjägmästare had the same uniform with general's insignia and bouillon tassels in the belt.

== See also ==
- Hofjægermester
