= Internal rent =

Internal rent is a form of transfer pricing where a company owning its own premises forces single departments in that company to pay rent for the real estate they use. This is typically organized by one department—the holding department—functioning as a landlord, while the other departments—the occupying departments—functioning as tenants.

One study lists two advantages with internal rents:

- It requires the occupying department to "contribute" an amount to the business equivalent to the open market rental value of the space that it occupies. This prevents the treating of space as a free good and, as an individual profit centre, each department will then rationalise its holdings to minimise its costs.
- The second advantage is from a strategic viewpoint: by charging an asset rent, the holding department can identify the performance of its real estate holdings. This can then be compared to an internal or external benchmark to help determine whether the company has adopted the most efficient tenure pattern for its properties.
