= HSwMS Södermanland =

Six warships of Sweden have been named Södermanland, after Södermanland:

- HSwMS Södermanland (1651), a warship launched in 1651.
- HSwMS Södermanland (1693), a warship launched in 1693.
- HSwMS Södermanland (1749), a galley launched in 1749.
- HSwMS Södermanland (1750), a warship launched in 1750.
- HSwMS Södermanland (J21), a Östergötland-class destroyer launched in 1956 and stricken in 1982.
- HSwMS Södermanland (1988), a Västergötland-class submarine launched in 1988 and since in active service.
