= HSwMS Uppland =

Several ships of the Swedish Navy have been named HSwMS Uppland, named after Uppland province:

- Uppland (1689), a ship of the line launched in 1689
- Uppland (1748), a galley launched in 1748
- Uppland (1749), a ship of the line launched in 1749 and lost in battle in 1790
- HSwMS Uppland (J17), a Öland-class destroyer launched in 1945 and decommissioned in 1979
- HSwMS Uppland (Upd), a Gotland-class submarine launched in 1996
