= HSwMS Östergötland =

Two warships of Sweden have been named Östergötland, after Östergötland:

- Östergötland (1749), a galley launched in 1749.
- HSwMS Östergötland (J20), a Östergötland-class destroyer launched in 1956 and stricken in 1982.
- HSwMS Östergötland (Ögd), a Västergötland-class submarine launched in 1988 and decommissioned in 2021.
