= Cay Holmberg =

Swedish Navy officer (1933–2025)

- Born: Cay Hake Holmberg; 27 March 1933; Gothenburg, Sweden
- Died: 16 June 2025 (aged 92); Stockholm, Sweden
- Relatives: Filippa Reinfeldt (daughter); Fredrik Reinfeldt (former son-in-law)
- Military career
- Allegiance: Sweden
- Branch: Swedish Navy
- Service years: 1957–1992
- Rank: Senor captain
- Commands: HSwMS Södermanland; HSwMS Östergötland; Berga Naval Training Schools; Neutral Nations Supervisory Commission

Senior Captain Cay Hake Holmberg (27 March 1933 – 16 June 2025) was a Swedish Navy officer. Holmberg graduated from the Royal Swedish Naval Academy in 1957 and began his naval career as a sub-lieutenant. Over the years, he underwent various training programs and held positions of increasing responsibility, including commanding destroyers and serving as a strategy teacher. He represented Sweden at the Third United Nations Conference on the Law of the Sea for an extended period. In 1987, he became head of the Navy Weapons Inspection and was promoted to senior captain. Later, he served as head of the Swedish contingent at the Neutral Nations Supervisory Commission in Korea, where he held the acting rank of rear admiral until December 1991. Overall, his career spanned several decades and included significant international service.

== Early life ==
Holmberg was born on 27 March 1933 in Johanneberg Parish in Gothenburg, Sweden, the son of managing director Cay Holmberg and his wife Lilly (née Bengtsson). He passed studentexamen in 1954.

== Career ==
Holmberg graduated from the Royal Swedish Naval Academy in 1957 and was commissioned as a naval officer and appointed acting sub-lieutenant in the Swedish Navy the same year. He then served with the future ambassador Lave Johnsson on the minesweeper HSwMS Landsort. Holmberg completed anti-submarine warfare training in the United Kingdom in 1962, and was promoted to lieutenant in 1965. Holmberg underwent the Swedish Armed Forces Staff College's staff course between 1966 and 1968 and the Swedish National Defence College's management course. He was promoted to lieutenant commander in 1970.

Holmberg commanded the destroyers HSwMS Södermanland and HSwMS Östergötland between 1971 and 1972 and was promoted to commander in 1972. He served as a strategy teacher at the Swedish Armed Forces Staff College from 1974 to 1977. Then he had the opportunity to represent Sweden at the Third United Nations Conference on the Law of the Sea for a total of 50 weeks between 1974 and 1982.

In 1978 Holmberg became head of Section 2 in the Eastern Military District, and in 1981 chief of staff at the East Coast Naval Base. In 1982 he became chief of staff of the Berga Naval Training Schools. Holmberg was appointed head of the Berga Naval Training Schools from 1 October 1983. Four years later, on 1 October 1987, Captain Holmberg became head of the Navy Weapons Inspection (Flottans vapenslagsinspektion) in the Naval Staff. He was simultaneously promoted to senior captain.

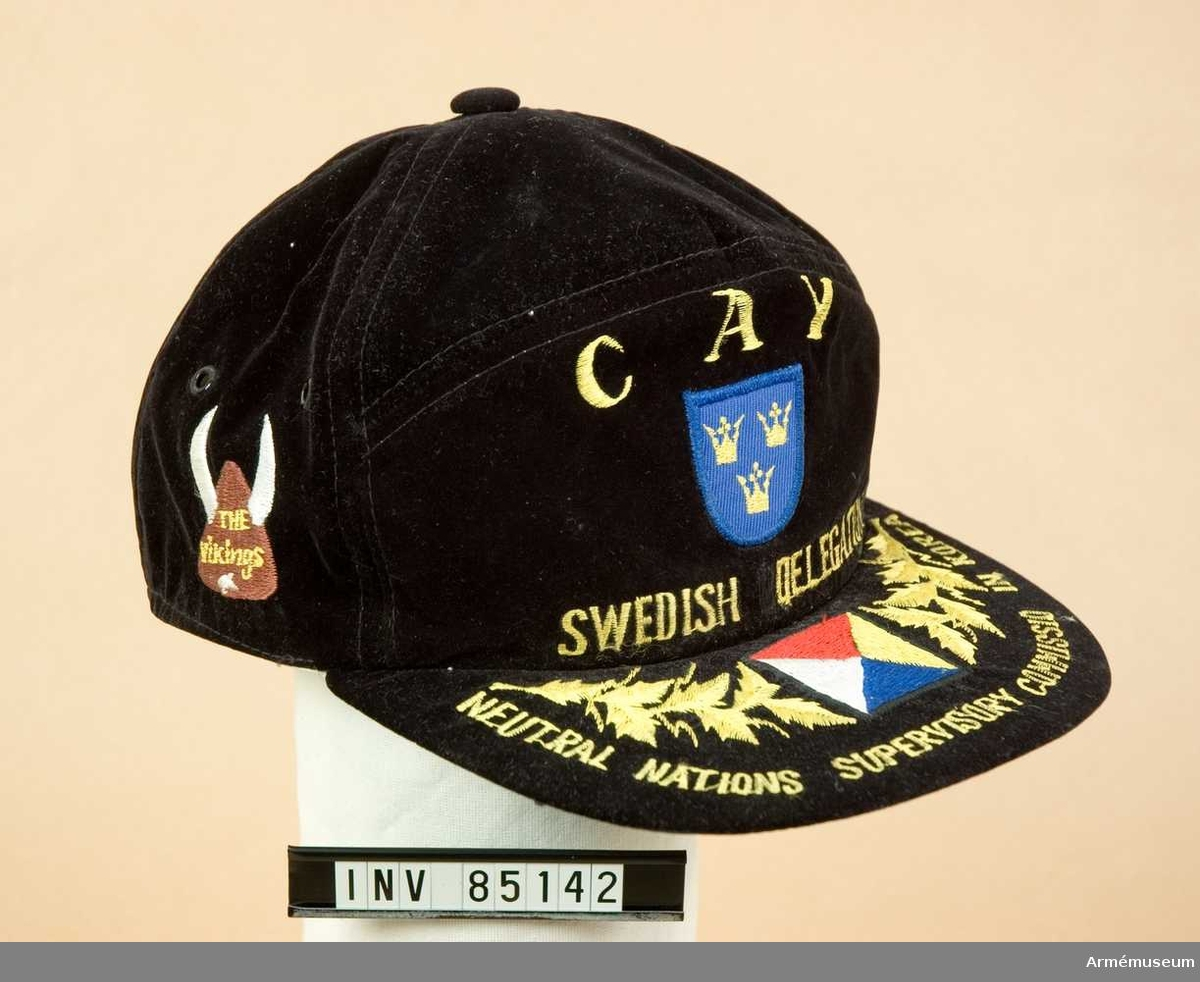
Cap worn by Holmberg in Panmunjom, South Korea 1991–1992.

In February 1990, Holmberg was appointed head of the Swedish contingent at the Neutral Nations Supervisory Commission in Korea. Swedish officers in international missions can be given a higher rank, whereby Holmberg had the acting rank of rear admiral during his service in Korea until 1 December 1991. The service was extended and in total he served in Korea from May 1990 to February 1992.

== Other work ==
Holmberg was a member of the Swedish Society for International Affairs (Utrikespolitiska samfundet).

Holmberg has been a law of the sea expert at the Ministry for Foreign Affairs and has represented the Swedish government in law of the sea negotiations.

In July 1981, he was elected chairman of the Marinlitteraturföreningen ("Marine Literature Association").

In 1987, on the initiative of, among others, Holmberg the naval association Flottans män local association was formed in Haninge. The formation was a "spin-off" from the main association in Stockholm.

Holmberg was chairman of the Association of Men of 1933 (Föreningen 1933 års män), an association for men born in 1933.

== Personal life ==
Holmberg got engaged to Ulla Molin in Stockholm on 3 January 1958. They had six children, of which one child died at under one year of age. Their daughter Filippa Holmberg was married to Sweden's Prime Minister Fredrik Reinfeldt from 1992 to 2013.

In 1989, he married Louise Hadorph (born 1943), the daughter of Carl Hadorph and Lilli (née Jacobsson).

== Death ==
Holmberg died on 16 June 2025 in Stockholm. The funeral service was held on 12 September 2025 in Gustaf Adolf Church in Stockholm.

== Dates of rank ==
- 1957 – Acting sub-lieutenant
- 19?? – Sub-lieutenant
- 1965 – Lieutenant
- 1970 – Lieutenant commander
- 1972 – Commander
- 1979 – Kommendörkapten med särskild tjänsteställning
- 1984 – Captain
- 1 October 1987 – Senior captain
- 1990 – Rear admiral (acting rank) (Note: Cay Holmberg had an acting rank of rear admiral as head of the Swedish contingent in the Neutral Nations Supervisory Commission from 1990 to 1992 but was senior captain in the Swedish Navy.)

== Awards and decorations ==
- (Sweden) Royal Swedish Society of Naval Sciences Medal of Merit in silver (2001)
- (South Korea) Order of National Security Merit, Cheonsu Medal (1992)
- (South Korea) Korean Service Medal (1992)

== Honours ==
- Member of the Royal Swedish Society of Naval Sciences (1969) (corresponding member)
- Member of the Royal Swedish Academy of War Sciences (1982)

== Bibliography ==
- Holmberg, Cay; Sevastik, Per (1986). Östersjön - fredens hav? (in Swedish). Stockholm: Utrikespolitiska institutet. ISBN 9171826998. LIBRIS: 7616613.
- Elger, Hans; Andrén, Nils; Holmberg, Cay (1983). Rymden och havet. Försvar och säkerhetspolitik, 0347-7703 (in Swedish). Stockholm: Centralförb. Folk och försvar. LIBRIS: 346733.
- Holmberg, Cay (1968). Öresund ur internationell och strategisk synvinkel (in Swedish). Kungl Örlogsmannasällskapet. LIBRIS: 21432187.

== Footnotes ==
Military offices
Preceded by Christer Söderhielm	Berga Naval Training Schools; 1983–1987	Succeeded by Tomas Lagerman
Preceded by Johan Bring	Navy Weapons Inspection; 1987–1990	Succeeded by None
Preceded by Finn Werner	Neutral Nations Supervisory Commission; 1990–1992	Succeeded by Leif Nilsson
