= Gunnar Grandin =

Swedish Navy officer (1918–2004)

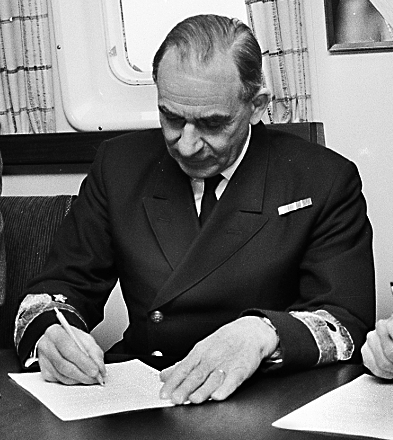
- Rear Admiral Grandin in 1982
- Born: Gunnar Emil Grandin; 10 July 1918; Västerås, Sweden
- Died: 2 August 2004 (aged 86); Nacka, Sweden
- Burial place: Galärvarvskyrkogården
- Military career
- Branch: Swedish Navy
- Service years: 1940–1982
- Rank: Rear Admiral
- Commands: 1st Destroyer Flotilla; Weapons Department, KMF; Weapons Department, FMV; Main Navy Materiel Department, FMV

Rear Admiral Gunnar Emil Grandin (10 July 1918 – 2 August 2004) was a Swedish Navy officer. Grandin's career in the Swedish Navy began in 1940 when he graduated from the Royal Swedish Naval Academy. Over the years, he rose through the ranks, serving on coastal defence ships and minesweepers. By 1965, he had attained the rank of captain. In his later career, Grandin played a crucial role in the development and procurement of naval equipment and systems for the Swedish Navy. He helped transition Sweden from relying on foreign naval electronics to achieving self-sufficiency in this area. This collaboration extended to other Nordic countries, especially Denmark and Norway, resulting in cost-sharing for various projects and more efficient production.

Grandin's contributions were not limited to his naval career; he was actively involved in various naval societies and played a role in preserving naval history. He was also instrumental in creating the Swedish Room at the Museo Storico Navale in Venice, Italy. His career culminated in his promotion to rear admiral in 1970, where he oversaw the planning and procurement of ships and weapon systems for the Swedish Navy. He retired in 1982.

== Early life ==
Grandin was born on 10 July 1918 in Saint Giles Parish in Västerås, Västmanland County, Sweden, the son of Emil Grandin and his wife Celeste (née Andersson). He passed studentexamen in 1937.

== Career ==
Grandin graduated from the Royal Swedish Naval Academy in 1940 and was commissioned as a naval officer and appointed acting sub-lieutenant in the Swedish Navy the same year. In his younger years, he mostly served aboard coastal defence ships and minesweepers. In 1942, he held the rank of sub-lieutenant and served as a communication and submarine hunting officer on the destroyer HSwMS Nordenskjöld. He was promoted to lieutenant in 1947 and attended the Royal Swedish Naval Staff College's staff course from 1947 to 1948 and its technical course from 1948 to 1949. In 1953, he underwent a mine clearance course in the United States. He then served as an officer in the Naval Staff's Planning Department from 1953 to 1956.

Grandin was promoted to lieutenant commander in 1957. He served at the Royal Swedish Naval Materiel Administration's Naval Mine Office from 1957 to 1960 and was the head of the Naval Staff's Planning Department from 1960. Grandin was promoted to commander in 1961. As a commander, he served as the head of the Naval Staff's Planning Department from 1960 to 1966, where he, in collaboration with the Swedish National Defence Research Institute, introduced operational analysis as an important tool in the organization's activities. During this period, he was promoted to captain on 1 October 1965.

At the end of July 1966, he and three other officers, along with the Chief of the Navy, Vice Admiral Åke Lindemalm, traveled to the Soviet Union upon an invitation from the Commander-in-Chief of the Soviet Navy, Fleet Admiral Sergey Gorshkov. The visit commenced in Moscow, after which they traveled to Leningrad and visited the Naval Academy and the Central Naval Museum. He also paid a visit to the old cruiser Auora. On 31 July, they participated in the celebration of the Soviet Navy Day. In October 1966, he was appointed as the commander of the 1st Destroyer Flotilla.

From 1967, Grandin served as the head of the Weapon Department of the Royal Swedish Naval Materiel Administration. Between 16 June and 20 June 1967, Grandin made an unofficial naval visit to Leningrad together with the destroyers HSwMS Södermanland and HSwMS Uppland. On 1 July 1968, the Royal Swedish Naval Materiel Administration was amalgamated into the newly formed authority, the Swedish Defence Materiel Administration (FMV), and from the same date, Grandin was appointed as the head of the Weapon Department in the Naval Material Administration of FMV. On 1 October 1970, Grandin succeeded Major General Benkt Dahlberg as the head of the Naval Material Administration (later called the Main Navy Materiel Department) within the Swedish Defence Materiel Administration, and he was promoted to rear admiral in the navy from the same date. Grandin now held the position of overseeing the planning and procurement of ships and weapon systems for the Swedish Navy.

It was a comprehensive area of responsibility he was now responsible for. Complete ship systems for combat and reconnaissance – above and below the water – modernization and new construction of advanced coastal defence systems, and more. Up until the early 1960s, modern naval electronics (radar, etc.) had primarily been acquired from abroad. Fruitful collaboration between the Swedish Defence Materiel Administration and the Swedish defence industry led to Sweden gradually becoming largely self-sufficient in this increasingly important area of materiel. Significant exports were also realized. Grandin worked diligently toward this goal. He quickly established working relationships with his colleagues, primarily in Denmark and Norway – in the spirit of the Nordic Council. Extensive cooperation within the field of naval materiel was established. Costs for certain development projects could be shared (e.g., torpedoes, missiles); more efficient mass production in the industry with longer production runs, and thus lower costs for the customer. For his collaboration with Norway, Grandin was awarded the Commander's Cross of the Order of St. Olav. Grandin retired on 30 September 1982, and was succeeded by Rear Admiral Ola Backman.

== Later life ==
Grandin was elected as a member of the Swedish association for the preservation of Venice, Pro Venezia, in May 1982. In July 1982 he became a member of the National Swedish Museums of Military History (Statens försvarshistoriska museer, SFHM).

Grandin served as the chairman of the Swedish Shipping and Navy League (Sveriges Flotta) and the Naval Officers Society in Stockholm (Sjöofficerssällskapet i Stockholm). Under his leadership, the majority of the Amiralitetskollegiets historia 1934–68 ("History of the Swedish Admiralty College 1934–68") was completed. He oversaw the compilation of memorial writings such as Allmänna försvarsföreningen 100 år ("The General Defense Association – 100 Years") and Karlskronavarvet 300 år ("Karlskrona Shipyard – 300 Years"). He was a naval military expert for the Nationalencyklopedin. He took on the task of creating the Swedish Room at the Museo Storico Navale in Venice, Italy, which was inaugurated on 12 June 1984.

== Personal life ==
He became engaged to Emmy Wiveka Hallbeck (1917–2012), daughter of the director N.P. Andersson in April 1942. Banns were published in July 1943, and they got married in St. Mary's Church in Helsingborg on 14 August 1943. They had a son on 6 February 1945 at the Karolinska Hospital in Stockholm. Two more sons were born at the Karolinska Hospital on 17 August 1946. A fourth son was born on 26 April 1953 at the Karolinska Hospital.

After their retirement, the Grandin couple settled in the city of Grasse on the French Riviera during the winter.

== Death ==
Grandin died on 2 August 2004. The funeral service was held on 10 September 2004 in Nacka Church in Nacka, Stockholm. He was interred at Galärvarvskyrkogården in Stockholm on 23 September 2004.

== Dates of rank ==
- 1940 – Acting sub-lieutenant
- 19?? – Sub-lieutenant
- 1947 – Lieutenant
- 1957 – Lieutenant commander
- 1961 – Commander
- 1 October 1965 – Captain
- 1 October 1970 – Rear admiral

== Awards and decorations ==
- (Sweden) Commander 1st Class of the Order of the Sword (18 November 1971)
- (Sweden) Commander of the Order of the Sword (15 November 1968)
- (Sweden) Knight of the Order of the Sword (1958)
- (Norway) Commander of the Order of St. Olav
- Knight 1st Class of the Order of the Lion of Finland

== Honours ==
- Member of the Royal Swedish Society of Naval Sciences (1957)
- Honorary member of the Royal Swedish Society of Naval Sciences (1970)
- Member of the Royal Swedish Academy of War Sciences (1965)

== Bibliography ==
- Grandin, Gunnar (1989). Slaget vid Hogland 1788: ett tvåhundraårsminne i museets samlingar [The Battle of Hogland 1788: a bicentennial commemoration in the museum's collections] (in Swedish). Stockholm. SELIBR 19695638.
- Grandin, Gunnar; Engdahl, Roland; Rheborg, Rolf (1955). Jagare i vårt framtida sjöförsvar [Destroyers in our future naval defense] (in Swedish). Stockholm: Kvinnoförb. för Sveriges sjöförsvar. SELIBR 1451763.

Military offices
Preceded by Harry Engblom	1st Destroyer Flotilla; 1966–1967	Succeeded by Per Rudberg
Preceded by None	Main Navy Materiel Department, FMV; 1970–1982	Succeeded by Ola Backman
