= HSwMS Hälsingland (J23) =

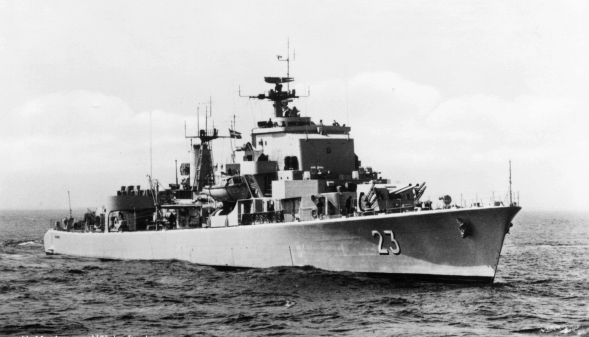
- HSwMS Hälsingland

History

Sweden
- Name: Hälsingland
- Namesake: Hälsingland
- Ordered: March 1953
- Builder: Götaverken
- Launched: 14 January 1957
- Commissioned: 17 June 1959
- Decommissioned: 1 July 1982
- Identification: Pennant number: J23
- Fate: Scrapped
- Badge

General characteristics
- Class & type: Östergötland-class destroyer
- Displacement: 2,180 t (2,150 long tons) standard; 2,600 t (2,600 long tons) full load
- Length: 112 m (367 ft 5 in)
- Beam: 11.2 m (36 ft 9 in)
- Draft: 3.7 m (12 ft 2 in)
- Propulsion: 2 shaft geared turbines, 2 boilers, 47,000 hp (35,000 kW)
- Speed: 35 kn (65 km/h)
- Range: 3,000 nmi (6,000 km) at 20 knots (37 km/h)
- Armament: 2 × dual 120 mm (4.7 in) m/44 guns; 7 × single Bofors 40 mm m/48 guns; 6 × single 533 mm (21.0 in) torpedo tubes; Torped 61; 1 × Squid anti-submarine mortar; 1 × quad Seacat SAM

HSwMS Hälsingland (J23) was the fourth ship of the Östergötland-class destroyer.

== Design ==
Due to time and cost, HSwMS Östergötland, like the other ships in the class, was built largely according to the drawings of the Öland-class destroyer. The length of the ship was 111.8 meters and the beam was 11.2 meters. Due to different equipment, however, the new vessels became about 200 tons heavier, which gave a draft of 3.7 meters, against the Öland-class of 3.4 meters. The machinery consisted of two oil-fired steam boilers of the Babcock & Wilcox brand, which supplied steam with a pressure of 32 bars to two steam turbines of the DeLaval brand, which in turn each operated a propeller. The machinery gave the effect 47,000 horsepower on the axles, which gave a top speed of 35 knots.

The main guns consisted of four 120 mm (4.7 in) guns m/44 placed in two double towers, one on the foredeck and one on the aft deck. From the beginning, the air defense consisted of seven 40 mm automatic cannons w / 48 E. These were placed two for the superstructure, one on each side amidships, and three on the aft bridge. Around 1965, the middle cannon on the aft bridge was replaced by the anti-aircraft missile Robot 07, and to increase the stability of the ship, the two cannons were removed at the same time amidships. For the same reason, all six torpedo tubes were also placed in a tube rack, having previously stood in two racks. There were also two submarine bombers and 58 mines on board.

== History ==
Hälsingland was built at Götaverken in Gothenburg and was launched on 14 January 1957 and commissioned on 17 June 1959.

Gästrikland was decommissioned on 1 July 1982, after which her superstructure has been dismantled and transferred to Upper Norrland's military area, where they were intended to be used for invasion defense. However, she were never used but were later scrapped. The hull was used by disposal of FOA for explosive tests, before it was sold for scrap in Karlskrona.
