= HSwMS Södermanland (J21) =

Swedish Östergötland-class destroyer

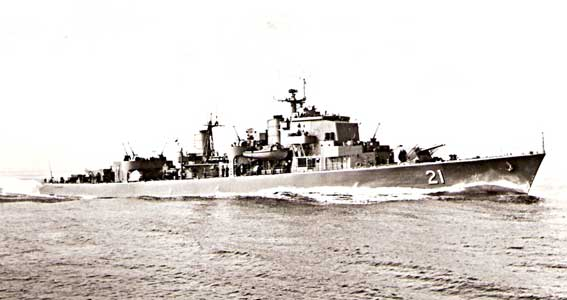
- HSwMS Södermanland

History

Sweden
- Name: Södermanland
- Namesake: Swedish province Södermanland
- Ordered: March 1953
- Builder: Götaverken
- Launched: 28 May 1956
- Commissioned: 27 June 1958
- Decommissioned: 1 July 1982
- Identification: Pennant number: J21
- Fate: Scrapped, 1985
- Badge

General characteristics
- Class & type: Östergötland-class destroyer
- Displacement: 2,180 t (2,150 long tons) standard; 2,600 t (2,600 long tons) full load
- Length: 112 m (367 ft 5 in)
- Beam: 11.2 m (36 ft 9 in)
- Draft: 3.7 m (12 ft 2 in)
- Propulsion: 2 shaft geared turbines, 2 boilers, 47,000 hp (35,000 kW)
- Speed: 35 kn (65 km/h)
- Range: 3,000 nmi (6,000 km) at 20 knots (37 km/h)
- Armament: 2 × dual 120 mm (4.7 in) m/44 guns; 7 × single Bofors 40 mm m/48 guns; 6 × single 533 mm (21.0 in) torpedo tubes; Torped 61; 1 × Squid anti-submarine mortar; 1 × quad Seacat SAM

HSwMS Södermanland (J21) was the second ship of the Östergötland-class destroyer.

== Design ==
Due to time and cost, HSwMS Östergötland, like the other ships in the class, was built largely according to the drawings of the Öland-class destroyer. The length of the ship was 111.8 meters and the beam was 11.2 meters. Due to different equipment, however, the new vessels became about 200 tons heavier, which gave a draft of 3.7 meters, against the Öland-class of 3.4 meters. The machinery consisted of two oil-fired steam boilers of the Babcock & Wilcox brand, which supplied steam with a pressure of 32 bars to two steam turbines of the DeLaval brand, which in turn each operated a propeller. The machinery gave the effect 47,000 horsepower on the axles, which gave a top speed of 35 knots.

The main guns consisted of four 120 mm (4.7 in) guns m/44 placed in two double towers, one on the foredeck and one on the aft deck. From the beginning, the air defense consisted of seven 40 mm automatic cannons w / 48 E. These were placed two for the superstructure, one on each side amidships, and three on the aft bridge. Around 1965, the middle cannon on the aft bridge was replaced by the anti-aircraft missile Robot 07, and to increase the stability of the ship, the two cannons were removed at the same time amidships. For the same reason, all six torpedo tubes were also placed in a tube rack, having previously stood in two racks. There were also two submarine bombers and 58 mines on board.

== History ==
Södermanland was built at Götaverken in Gothenburg and was launched on 28 May 1956 in which her sea trial took place in 1957 and commissioned on 27 June 1958. In the case of the Södermanland, unlike her sister ship Hälsingland, Eriksbergs Mekaniska Verkstad just built the hull, with completion and fitting out done by Kockums Mekaniska Verkstads AB. The reasons for this are unclear, though it may possibly have been part of a work share agreement.

Södermanland was decommissioned on 1 July 1982 and sold in 1985 for scrapping in Spain.
