= J22 =

J22 may refer to:

== Vehicles ==
=== Aircraft ===
- FFVS J 22, Swedish fighter
- Junkers J 22, a German prototype fighter
- Soko J-22 Orao, a Yugoslavian light bomber

=== Locomotives ===
- GNR Class J22, a British steam locomotive class

=== Ships and boats ===
- J/22, a keelboat
- HMS Britomart (J22), a Halcyon-class minesweeper of the Royal Navy
- HSwMS Gästrikland (J22), an Östergötland-class destroyer of the Swedish Navy
- INS Sarvekshak (J22), a Sandhayak-class survey ship of the Indian Navy

== Other uses ==
- County Route J22 (California)
- Gyroelongated triangular cupola, a Johnson solid (J_{22})
- Jennings J-22, a pistol
