= Torbjörn Hultman =

Swedish Navy officer

- Born: Torbjörn Åke Hultman; 7 May 1937 (age 89); Malmö, Sweden
- Military career
- Allegiance: Sweden
- Branch: Swedish Navy
- Service years: 1958–1997
- Rank: Rear Admiral
- Commands: HSwMS Gästrikland; Underwater Department, FMV; Main Department for Naval Materiel, FMV; Navy Materiel Division, FMV

Rear Admiral Torbjörn Åke Hultman (born 7 May 1937) is a retired Swedish Navy officer. Hultman graduated from the Royal Swedish Naval Academy in 1958 and began his career as a naval officer, serving on destroyers and torpedo boats until 1964. He then transitioned into various educational roles and technical training, ultimately leading the countermeasure office in the Naval Staff's Signal Intelligence Department. Hultman managed the development of the ARTE 722 fire control system and later became head of the Missile Section at the Artillery and Missile Bureau within the Swedish Defence Materiel Administration, where he played a crucial role in procuring anti-ship missiles, including the RBS 15. Promoted to rear admiral in 1988, he led the Main Department for Naval Materiel from 1989 to 1996, overseeing significant advancements in naval technology, particularly in submarine protection. Hultman retired in 1997.

== Early life ==
Hultman was born on 7 May 1937 in Malmö Saint John Parish in Malmöhus County, Sweden, the son of Axel Hultman, a manager, and his wife Margit (née Widén), a lecturer. He passed his student exam at Enskede Higher General Secondary School (Enskede högre allmänna läroverk) on 2 May 1955.

== Career ==
Hultman graduated from the Royal Swedish Naval Academy in 1958 and was commissioned as a naval officer the same year. Thereafter, he served in the gunnery and combat department on board destroyers and torpedo boats during sea deployments in the Coastal Fleet from 1959 to 1964. He attended schools (both as a teacher and a student) from 1964 to 1969, participated in the higher technical course at the Swedish Armed Forces Staff College from 1967 to 1969, and served in the Coastal Fleet from 1969 to 1971.

As his first assignment after completing the Navy Program's Technical Course (Marinlinjens tekniska kurs, MTK), Hultman became the head of the countermeasure office in the Naval Staff's Signal Intelligence Department. His main task there was, in collaboration with the Swedish National Defence Research Institute, to develop a TTEM (Tactical, Organizational, and Economic Objective) for a strip countermeasure system for surface combatants, which he had proposed in his individual report. The system [MAS] was subsequently realized, procured, and installed on a large number of ships. Hultman's next position was as the office and section head for the fire control section (VAE) within the Artillery Bureau at the Main Department for Naval Materiel (FMV-M) within the Swedish Defence Materiel Administration (FMV) from 1971 to 1976. In addition to the usual administrative duties at this level, he was tasked with being the navy's project manager for the new analog fire control system ARTE 722 for the new Spica II-class, which was later modified to the Norrköping-class missile boat. This role involved closely monitoring and directing the development of this large fire control system in collaboration with the supplier Peab as the responsible representative for the customer. From 1976 to 1977, he served as the ship's captain. In September 1977, Hultman, as a lieutenant commander, was the commander of the destroyer HSwMS Gästrikland when he won the Duke of Halland's wandering trophy for torpedo shooting with destroyers (the Prince's Cup, Prinsens pokal).

From 1977 to 1981, he was the head of the Missile Section at the Artillery and Missile Bureau in the Weapon Department at FMV. There, he served as the project manager for the procurement of anti-ship missile systems for the navy. In the autumn of 1978, Hultman became the navy's project manager for the Harpoon missile system procurement and was tasked, along with FMV's commercial division, with initiating negotiations with the United States Navy, which was the American counterpart (known as FMS procurement). The next step in the development occurred when the Swedish government rejected the Supreme Commander's request to acquire Harpoon in the autumn of 1978 and instead ordered the Supreme Commander and FMV to investigate the possibility of acquiring a naval missile system from the Swedish defence industry jointly for the navy and the air force. Saab AB had offered such an alternative and had made significant efforts to facilitate this development. The result was a decision to procure a joint missile system for the navy and air force from Saab AB, designated RBS 15. Hultman was appointed as the joint project manager for FMV, with a deputy project manager from the air force, Aviation Director Sven Ydell. The contract for the development and series production of the Swedish anti-ship missile system RBS 15M was signed on 17 July 1979. Hultman continued as the project manager for RBS 15 until 1981. On 25 June 1981, he was appointed captain and chief engineer at the Main Department for Naval Materiel (FMV-M). He also served as the acting head of planning at FMV-M from 1981 to 1982. In June 1982, he was appointed head of the System Planning Bureau at the System Department.

In December 1982, Hultman was appointed head of the Technical Administration at the East Coast Naval Base at Muskö. He attended the Swedish National Defence College in 1984. In June 1984, Hultman was appointed technical director and department head for the Underwater Weapons Department at FMV, effective 1 October of the same year. He was promoted to senior captain on 1 October 1984, and served in this position until 1989. His time as head of the Underwater Department coincided with the major submarine hunts of the 1980s. Hultman was involved with FMV in a three-year research program, in collaboration with the Swedish National Defence Research Institute, to significantly improve Swedish submarine protection. Among the new developments were hydrophones for submarines and patrol boats designed to address the challenges posed by the rugged underwater topography of the Swedish archipelagos, as well as active bottom hydrophones for submarines. Additionally, new small unconventional torpedoes for shallower waters were ordered, along with a new generation of naval mines. The Elma ASW-600 anti-submarine warfare system was also procured by the navy and tested during Hultman's tenure in the Underwater Department.

In December 1988, Hultman, who was then the department head at the Main Department for Naval Materiel, was appointed rear admiral and head of the main department. He led the Main Department for Naval Materiel (Huvudavdelningen för marinmateriel, FMV-M) from 1989 to 1996, which was renamed Naval Materiel Administration (Marinmaterielledningen, MML) in 1993. He then served as head of the Navy Materiel Division (Division Marinmateriel, MDIV) from 1996 to 1997 and was a member of FMV's Executive Management during the same period. Hultman retired in 1997 and was succeeded by Rear Admiral Bertil Björkman.

In April 1998, Hultman, then retired, was awarded the Singapore Defence Technology Distinguished Fellowship (SDTDF) by Singapore's Deputy Prime Minister and Minister for Defence, Dr. Tony Tan for playing a vital role in sharing Sweden's expertise in naval ship technology with Singapore, particularly in the areas of mine counter-measure Vessels, patrol vessels, and submarine programs. Through the SDTDF, Hultman continued to provide consultancy on naval technology development to Singapore.

== Personal life ==
In November 1960, Hultman became engaged to Renate Romana Oettelt (born 1941), the daughter of construction engineer Robert Oettelt and Leopoldine (née Lauer) from Vienna, Austria. They were married on 9 July 1961, at Rønne Church in Rønne on Bornholm. A daughter was born on 14 May 1964, at the Södra barnbördshuset in Södermalm, Stockholm, and a son was born on 14 June 1968, at the Allmänna BB in Stockholm.

== Dates of rank ==
- 1958 – Acting sub-lieutenant
- 1960 – Sub-lieutenant
- 1966 – Lieutenant
- 1971 – Lieutenant commander
- 1972 – Commander
- 1980 – Kommendörkapten med särskild tjänsteställning
- 1981 – Captain
- 1 October 1984 – Senior Captain
- 1989 – Rear admiral

== Honours ==
- Member of the Royal Swedish Society of Naval Sciences, VSG III (Maritime technology), 1974
- Member of the Royal Swedish Academy of War Sciences, 1982
- Singapore Defence Technology Distinguished Fellowship (SDTDF), 2 April 1998

Military offices
Preceded by Ola Backman	Main Department for Naval Materiel, FMV; 1989–1996	Succeeded by Björn Nordbeck
Preceded by None	Navy Materiel Division, FMV; 1996–1997	Succeeded by Bertil Björkman
