= Ola Backman =

Swedish Navy officer

- Born: Ola Artur Backman; 3 December 1928; Upplands Väsby, Sweden
- Died: 22 February 2016 (aged 87); Västerhaninge, Sweden
- Military career
- Allegiance: Sweden
- Branch: Swedish Navy
- Service years: 1953–1989
- Rank: Rear Admiral
- Commands: Main Navy Materiel Department, FMV

Rear Admiral Ola Artur Backman (3 December 1928 – 22 February 2016) was a Swedish Navy officer. Backman had a distinguished career in the Swedish Navy, starting in 1953 when he graduated from the Royal Swedish Naval Academy and became a commissioned naval officer. He served on various naval vessels, including HSwMS Älvsnabben and HSwMS Drottning Victoria. Backman underwent training at different naval schools and earned promotions throughout his career, becoming a lieutenant commander in 1969 and a commander in 1971.

In 1978, he assumed the role of head of the Torpedo Office in the Main Navy Materiel Department within the Swedish Defence Materiel Administration (FMV) and was promoted to captain later that year. In 1980, Backman became the head of Technical Administration at the West Coast Naval Base/West Coast Naval Command in Gothenburg, and he attended the Swedish National Defence College in 1982. His significant career milestone came in 1982 when he was promoted to rear admiral and appointed head of the Main Navy Materiel Department at the FMV.

During his tenure at the FMV, Backman oversaw the development of several critical defence projects, including coastal artillery, anti-submarine technology, and the Stockholm-class corvette, amounting to a budget of 1.2 billion Swedish krona. His leadership coincided with a period of intense submarine defence activities in the 1980s, leading to the development of new ships, submarines, and weapons, along with the pioneering of stealth technology for ships.

== Early life ==
Backman was born on 3 December 1928 in Hammarby Parish in Upplands Väsby Municipality, Stockholm County, the son of Artur Backman, an engineer, and his wife Märta. He passed studentexamen in 1949. Backman was admitted to the Royal Swedish Naval Academy in 1949 but experienced a diving accident and had to interrupt his training.

== Career ==
Backman graduated from the Royal Swedish Naval Academy in 1953 and was commissioned as a naval officer in the Swedish Navy the same year. He was promoted to sub-lieutenant in 1955. He served on HSwMS Älvsnabben during her first long voyage, and then he spent the summer as an executive officer on the coastal defence ship HSwMS Drottning Victoria while she was moored as an engineering school. After a year at the Fleet Basic Training School (Värnpliktsskolan) in Karlskrona and the Weapons Officer School at Berga Naval Training Schools, he followed several years of service on destroyers, motor torpedo boats, and torpedo boats, interrupted by teaching service at the Berga Naval Training Schools, a general course, and an advanced torpedo technology course at the Swedish Armed Forces Staff College from 1963 to 1965. From 1966 to 1969, he served in the Planning Department at the Naval Staff.

In 1969, Backman was promoted to lieutenant commander, after which, he was the commander of a torpedo boat division from 1969 to 1971. He was promoted to commander in 1971, after which he served as commander of the Torpedo Section in the Weapons Department in the Naval Staff from 1971 to 1974. In April 1978, Backman was appointed head of the Torpedo Office in the Main Navy Materiel Department in the Swedish Defence Materiel Administration (FMV). He was promoted to captain from 1 October 1978.

In May 1980, he was appointed head of Technical Administration at the West Coast Naval Base/West Coast Naval Command in Gothenburg. He attended the Swedish National Defence College in 1982. Backman was promoted to rear admiral on 1 October 1982 and appointed head of the Main Navy Materiel Department at the Swedish Defence Materiel Administration succeeding Rear Admiral Gunnar Grandin. With a budget of 1.2 billion Swedish krona, the 12 cm mobile coastal artillery gun m/80, anti-submarine technology, and the Stockholm-class corvette were developed, among other things.

Backman's tenure as the head of the Main Navy Materiel Department at the Swedish Defence Materiel Administration (FMV) almost entirely coincided with the intense submarine defence activities of the 1980s. The Swedish Navy and the FMV were faced with war-like demands to rapidly and unconventionally develop, acquire, and put into operational use new weapons and new ship platforms to address the previously seriously neglected resource needs for the Navy's submarine defence capability. New surface combat vessels and submarines were designed and constructed. New command systems, underwater weapons, and sensors were developed and procured. This work was carried out within FMV in close collaboration with the Navy Command, units, and a significant portion of the Swedish defence industry. Extensive cooperation with the defence industries of other countries was also established. Within the then Swedish National Defence Research Institute, the largest collective defence research project in many decades, the "Submarine Defence Project" (Ubåtsskyddsprojektet) was conducted, in which FMV played a significant role. The close cooperation between the stakeholders, FMV, and the industry led to a highly successful and internationally acclaimed development of new ships, submarines, and weapons. In particular, the new stealth technology for ships that was developed during Backman's tenure, including the new trial platform HSwMS Smyge, attracted significant international interest. He was also instrumental in the development of the Norrköping-class missile boat. The work was extensive, under tight time constraints, and took place in a complex world with new and partly unconventional forms. Backman retired in 1989 and was succeeded by Rear Admiral Torbjörn Hultman.

== Other work ==
Backman was the chairman of the Naval Officers Society in Stockholm (Sjöofficerssällskapet i Stockholm, SOSS) from 1982 to 1990. During this time, significant changes occurred within the Swedish defence forces, including the introduction of the Ny befälsordning (NBO) ("New Command System") reform in 1983. The term "naval officer" was replaced with other concepts within the NBO. This necessitated changes in SOSS and the associated foundation's statutes and operations, addressing the question of who would be eligible to become a member of SOSS in the future and who would have the right to seek support and contributions from the Society's funds. Backman was deeply involved and led this effort, and in January 1990, the approval and decision to amend the statutes were granted by the Legal, Financial and Administrative Services Agency. During Backman's tenure, there were also significant developments and changes in the Society's activities. Substantial capital assets that had been tied up in the Society's funds began to be actively utilized within the framework of the foundation's statutes for the benefit and enjoyment of the members and their families.

Backman was chairman of the Royal Swedish Academy of War Sciences's Department IV from 1987 to 1990. He was also national chairman of the Kamratföreningen Flottans män ("Comrades' Association of the Men of the Swedish Fleet") from 1990 to 1996.

== Personal life ==
Backman became engaged to pharmacist Ann-Sofie Norrgren (born 1928), the daughter of Major Gustaf Norrgren and his wife (née Skoog), on 22 June 1952, in Falun. Banns were published in September 1953, and they got married in Kristine Church in Falun on 3 October 1953. They had two daughters and one son.

== Death ==
Backman died on 22 February 2016 in Västerhaninge, Sweden. The funeral service was held on 17 March 2016 in Västerhaninge Church.

== Dates of rank ==
- 1953 – Acting sub-lieutenant
- 1955 – Sub-lieutenant
- 1963 – Lieutenant
- 1969 – Lieutenant commander
- 1971 – Commander
- 1 October 1978 – Captain
- 1 October 1982 – Rear admiral

== Awards and decorations ==
- (Sweden) Knight of the Order of the Sword (6 June 1971)

== Honours ==
- Member of the Royal Swedish Society of Naval Sciences (1975)
- Member of the Royal Swedish Academy of War Sciences, Department II (1981)

Military offices
Preceded by Gunnar Grandin	Main Navy Materiel Department, FMV; 1982–1989	Succeeded by Torbjörn Hultman
