= HSwMS Öland =

Swedish destroyer

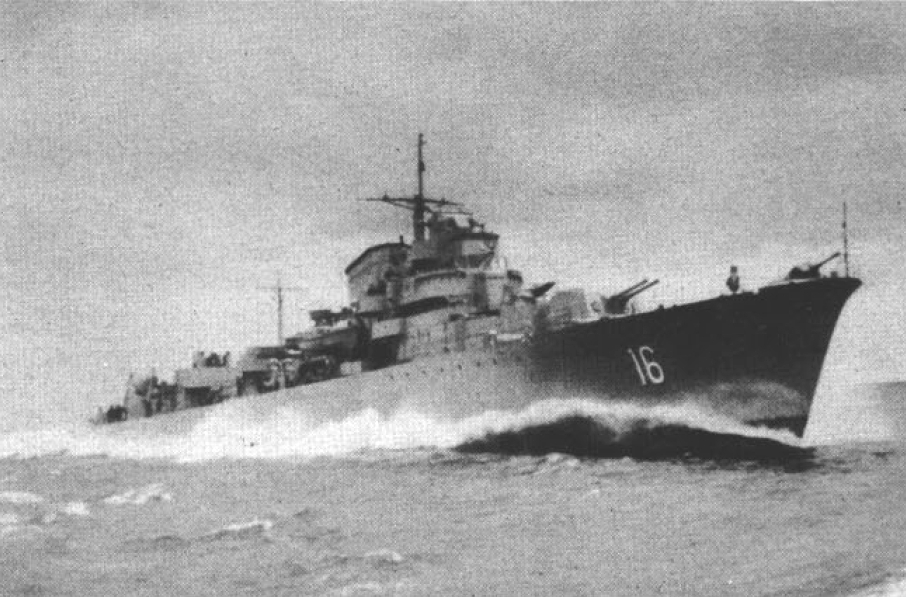
- HSwMS Öland underway in 1947

History

Sweden
- Name: Öland
- Namesake: Öland
- Ordered: 1 July 1943
- Builder: Saab Kockums
- Launched: 15 December 1945
- Completed: 5 December 1947
- Decommissioned: 1 July 1978
- Fate: Scrapped

General characteristics
- Class & type: Öland-class destroyer
- Displacement: 1,880 tonnes (1,850 long tons; 2,070 short tons) standard; 2,400 tonnes (2,400 long tons; 2,600 short tons) full load
- Length: 112 m (367 ft 5.4 in) o/a
- Beam: 11.2 m (36 ft 8.9 in)
- Draught: 3.4 m (11 ft 1.9 in)
- Propulsion: 2 Penhoët boilers; 2 geared de Laval geared steam turbines, 44,000 shp (33,000 kW)
- Speed: 35 knots (40.3 mph; 64.8 km/h)
- Range: 2,500 nmi (4,600 km) at 20 kn (37 km/h)
- Complement: 210
- Armament: 4 × Bofors 120 mm (4.7 in) dual-purpose guns (2×2); 7 × Bofors 40 mm (1.6 in) anti-aircraft guns (7×1); 8 × 25 mm (1.0 in) anti-aircraft guns (8×1); 6 × 533 mm (21 in) torpedo tubes (2×3); 1 x Squid ASW Mortar (post refit); 4 × depth charge throwers and 2 × depth charge racks; 60 × mines

HSwMS Öland was the lead ship of the two ship Öland-class of destroyers which served with the Royal Swedish Navy. Larger and more stable than previous Swedish destroyers, the vessel was launched on 15 December 1945. Armament was based around two twin mounting for semi-automatic 120 mm (4.7 in) guns, an extensive anti-aircraft defence of seven 40 mm (1.6 in) and eight 25 mm (1.0 in) guns and a quadruple 375 mm (15 in) anti-submarine rocket launcher, as well as torpedoes and mines. The ship was upgraded in 1960, which involved the addition of a Squid anti-submarine mortar amongst other alterations, and reclassified as a frigate in 1974, until ultimately being retired on 1 July 1978 as part of a strategy to remove larger combat vessels from the fleet.

== Design and development ==
Öland was the first Öland or Province class destroyer built for the Royal Swedish Navy. The ship was named after the Swedish province. Developed using lessons learned from the Second World War, the vessel was larger than previous Swedish destroyers. The design had a double hull, which, along with the larger size, meant that the class was more stable at sea. The hull was fulling welded, apart from armour plate, which was positioned around the engine room. The superstructure was also protected by light armour.

The destroyer had a length overall of 112 metres (367 ft 5.4 in) and 107 m (351 ft 0.6 in) between perpendiculars, a beam of 11.2 m (36 ft 8.9 in) and a draught of 3.4 m (11 ft 1.9 in). Displacement was 1,880 tonnes (1,850 long tons; 2,070 short tons) standard and 2,400 tonnes (2,400 long tons; 2,600 short tons) full load. Power was provided by two Penhoët boilers feeding two de Laval geared steam turbines rated at 44,000 shaft horsepower (33,000 kW) and driving two shafts. Design speed was 35 knots (65 km/h; 40 mph). A single funnel was fitted. 300 long tons (300 t) of oil were carried, giving a design range of 2,500 nautical miles (4,600 km; 2,900 mi) at 20 kn (37 km/h; 23 mph). The ship's complement was 210 officers and ratings.

As-built the armament consisted of four Bofors 120 mm (4.7 in) semi-automatic dual-purpose guns in two twin M/44 dual-purpose mounts on the ship's centreline, one on the forecastle and one aft. The guns could elevate to 80°. Anti-aircraft defense consisted of seven 40 mm (1.6 in) guns in 2 twin water cooled and power operated Hazemeyer stabilized mounts, one twin power operated mount with air cooled guns and one single hand-worked mount at the bow. Twin mountings were protected by splinter shields. Close range AA armament was completed with eight single mounts for Bofors 20 mm M/40 anti-aircraft guns arranged around the forward superstructure and funnel. Within a few years this was reduced to 4. Anti-submarine warfare armament consisted of four depth charge throwers and two depth charge racks.[5]Torpedo armament was based on two triple mounts for 533 mm (21 in) torpedo tubes. The vessel was also equipped for laying mines, carrying 60.[4] Mid-life refits saw the L60 40mm guns replaced by six 40mm L70 guns in single mounts and removal of all 20mm. A Squid ASW mortar was added.

== Construction and career ==
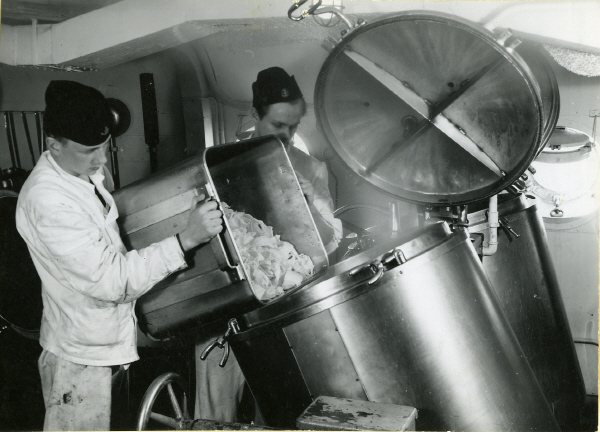
Cooking aboard Öland

Öland was ordered on 1 July 1943 from Kockums and laid down at the yard in Malmö shortly afterwards. Launched on 15 December 1945 by Per Albin Hansson, the ship was commissioned on 5 December 1947. The vessel was designed to act as part of a flotilla of destroyers under the command of one of the light cruisers of the Tre Kronor-class, the second of which was commissioned in the same month.

The destroyer underwent upgrades in 1949, 1953, 1960 and 1969 The 1960 modernisation was extensive, raising the standard displacement to 2,000 tonnes (2,000 long tons; 2,200 short tons), fitting a new bridge and replacing the depth charge throwers with a Squid anti-submarine mortar. The anti-aircraft armament was also upgraded. The 40-mm mount nearest to the jackstaff was removed and the remaining six were updated. The light anti-aircraft guns were subsequently removed in 1964. Radar was fitted and by 1974 Öland was equipped with a Thomson-CSF Saturn S band long range radar, a navigation set and two Hollandse Signaalapparaten M45 fire-control radars. In that year, the vessel was reclassified as a frigate.

Meanwhile, in 1972, the Riksdag decided to retire the existing fleet of frigates and cruisers, and focusing instead on a larger number of smaller and more nimble fast attack craft. The ship was subsequently removed from the Naval List on 1 July 1978 and broken up.
