= Östergötland-class destroyer =

Ship class

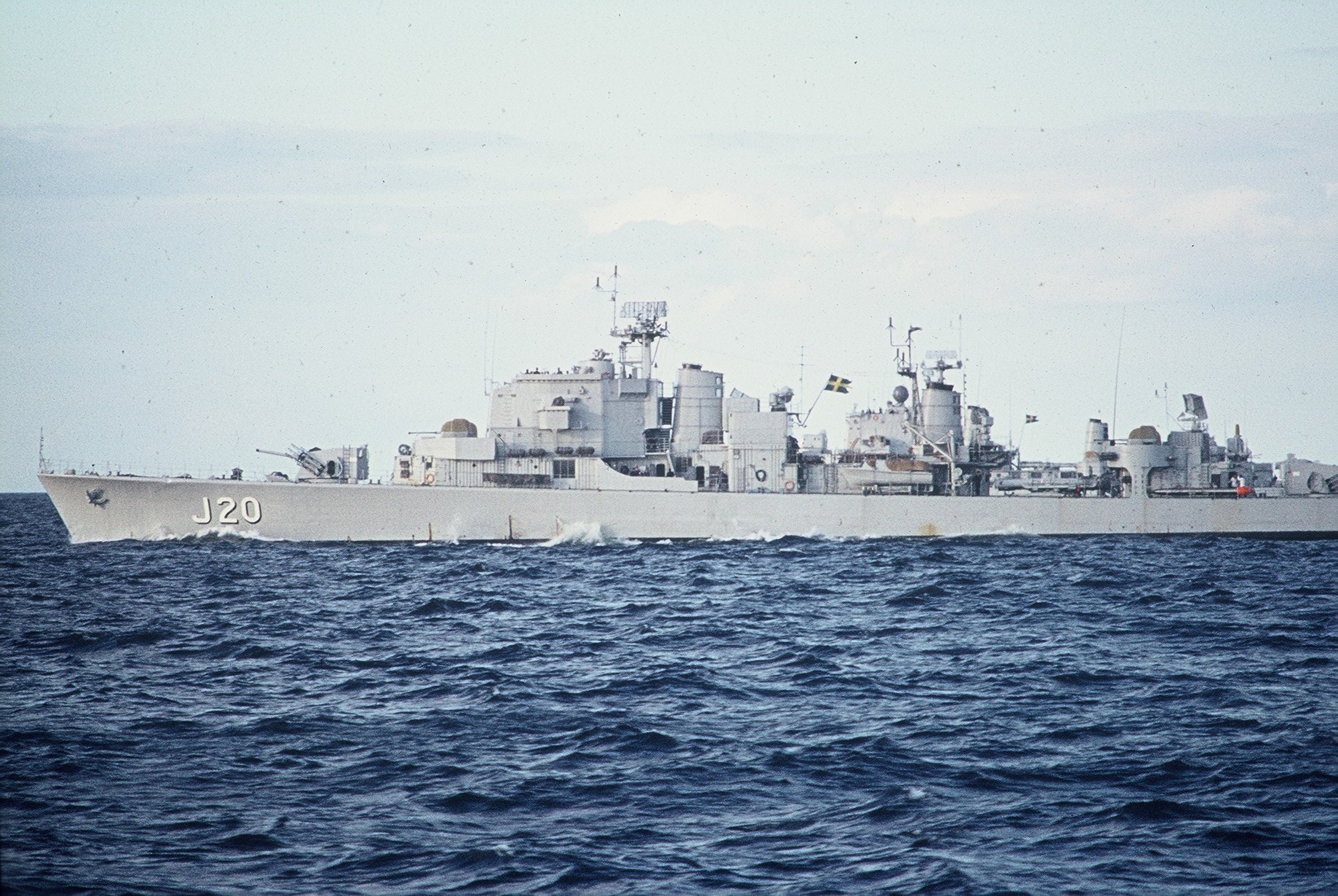
- HSwMS Östergötland

Class overview
- Name: Östergötland class
- Builders: Götaverken, Eriksbergs Mekaniska Verkstad, Kockums Mekaniska Verkstads AB
- Operators: Swedish Navy
- Preceded by: Halland class
- Succeeded by: Luleå class (capability successor)
- In commission: Sweden: 1958–1982
- Completed: 4
- Retired: 4

General characteristics
- Type: Destroyer
- Displacement: 2,150 tons standard; 2,600 tons full load
- Length: 112 m (367 ft 5 in)
- Beam: 11.2 m (36 ft 9 in)
- Draft: 3.7 m (12 ft 2 in)
- Propulsion: 2 shaft geared turbines, 2 boilers, 47,000 hp (35,000 kW)
- Speed: 35 kn (65 km/h)
- Range: 3,000 nmi (6,000 km) at 20 knots (37 km/h)
- Complement: 244
- Armament: 4 × 120 mm (4.7 in) guns m/44 (2×2); 7 × Bofors 40 mm AA guns m/48 (7×1); 6 × 533 mm (21.0 in) torpedo tubes (1×6 ) for Wire-guided Torped 61; 1 Squid anti-submarine mortar; 1 quadruple Seacat SAM launcher replaced 3 - 40mm guns in 1960's
- Notes: Ships of the class took part in a number of incidents and confrontations involving Soviet incursions into Swedish waters during the late 1970s and early 1980s, most notably the Whiskey on the rocks incident in 1981.

The Östergötland class were a class of destroyers built for the Swedish Navy in the late 1950s. They were smaller and less capable than the preceding Halland class and were decommissioned in 1982. The class were the last destroyers built by Sweden in the 20th century. They were sometimes referred to as light destroyers.

== Ships ==
ship	Pennant number	builder	commissioned	fate
HSwMS Östergötland	J20	Götaverken, Göteborg	1958	Decommissioned 1982
HSwMS Södermanland	J21	Eriksberg, Göteborg (Note: In the case of the Södermanland, unlike her sister ship Hälsingland, Eriksbergs Mekaniska Verkstad just built the hull, with completion and fitting out done by Kockums Mekaniska Verkstads AB. The reasons for this are unclear, though it may possibly have been part of a work share agreement.)	1958	Decommissioned 1982
HSwMS Gästrikland	J22	Götaverken, Göteborg	1959	Decommissioned 1982
HSwMS Hälsingland	J23	Eriksberg, Göteborg	1959	Decommissioned 1982

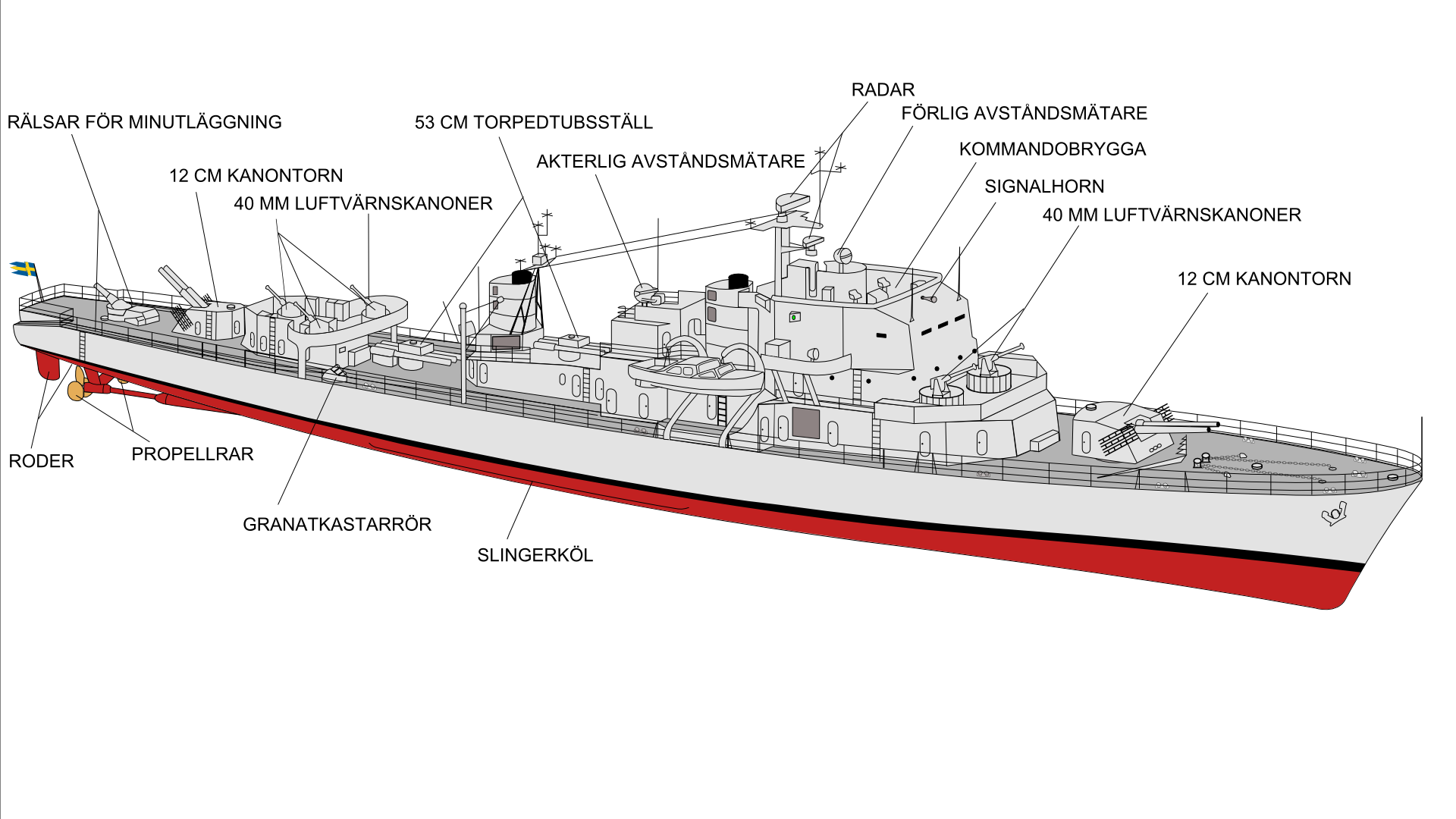
The general layout of an Östergötland destroyer, prior to the class being modernised between 1963 and 1967

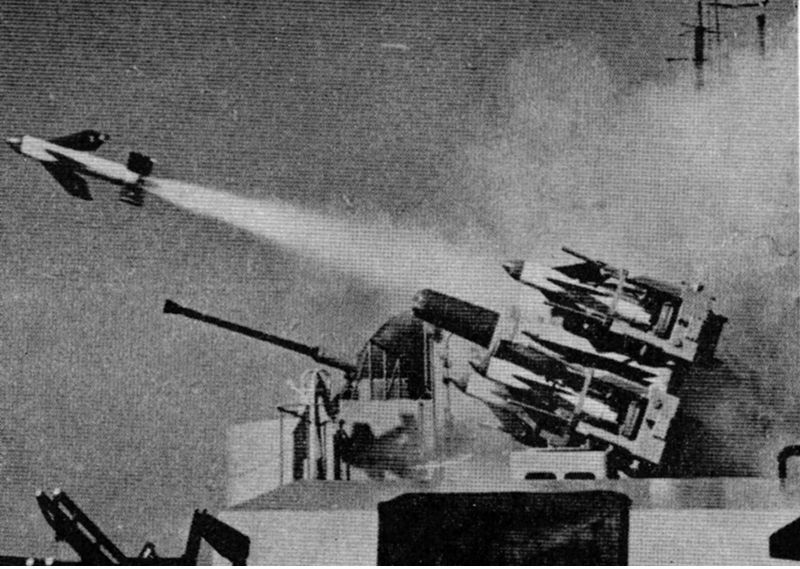
Södermanland testing its newly installed Sea Cat launcher sometime during 1963. The linked CRBFD used a variant of the M4 radar manufactured by Hollandse Signaalapparaten.

== See also ==
- List of destroyers of the Swedish Navy

Equivalent destroyers of the same era

- Skory class
- Holland class
- Ayanami class
- Zerstörer 1 class
- Artigliere class
