= HSwMS Uppland (J17) =

Swedish destroyer

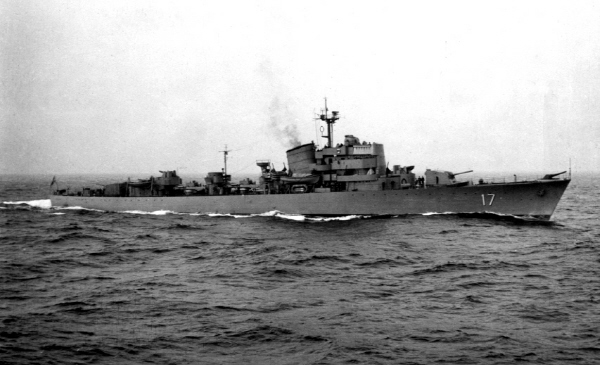
- HSwMS Uppland underway in 1947

History

Sweden
- Name: Uppland
- Namesake: Uppland
- Ordered: 26 November 1943
- Builder: Karlskronavarvet
- Launched: 15 November 1946
- Completed: 31 January 1948
- Decommissioned: 1 July 1978
- Fate: Scrapped

General characteristics
- Class & type: Öland-class destroyer
- Displacement: 1,880 tonnes (1,850 long tons; 2,070 short tons) standard; 2,400 tonnes (2,400 long tons; 2,600 short tons) full load
- Length: 112 m (367 ft 5.4 in) o/a
- Beam: 11.2 m (36 ft 8.9 in)
- Draught: 3.4 m (11 ft 1.9 in)
- Propulsion: 2 Penhoët boilers; 2 geared de Laval geared steam turbines, 44,000 shp (33,000 kW)
- Speed: 35 kn (40.3 mph; 64.8 km/h)
- Range: 2,500 nmi (4,600 km) at 20 kn (37 km/h)
- Complement: 210
- Armament: 4 × Bofors 120 mm (4.7 in) dual-purpose guns (2×2); 7 × Bofors 40 mm (1.6 in) anti-aircraft guns (7×1); 8 × Bofors 20 mm (1 in) anti-aircraft guns (8×1); 6 × 533 mm (21 in) torpedo tubes (2×3); 1 × Squid anti-submarine Mortar (after refit); 4 × depth charge throwers and 2 × depth charge racks (before refit); 60 × mines

HSwMS Uppland was a Öland-class destroyer which served with the Royal Swedish Navy. Larger and more stable than previous Swedish destroyers, the vessel was launched on 15 December 1948. Armament was based around two twin mounting for semi-automatic 120 mm (4.7 in) guns, an extensive anti-aircraft defence of seven 40 mm (1.6 in) and eight 20 mm (1 in) guns and a quadruple 375 mm (15 in) anti-submarine rocket launcher, as well as torpedoes and mines. The ship was upgraded in 1963, which involved the addition of a helicopter platform amongst other alterations, and reclassified as a frigate in 1974, until ultimately being retired on 1 July 1978 as part of a strategy to remove larger combat vessels from the fleet.

== Design and development ==
Uppland was the second and final Öland or Province class destroyer built for the Royal Swedish Navy. The ship was named after the Swedish province. Using lessons learned from the Second World War, the vessel was larger than previous Swedish designs. The design had a double hull, which, along with the larger size, meant that the class was more stable at sea. The hull was fulling welded, apart from armour plate, which was positioned around the engine room. The superstructure was also protected by light armour.

The destroyer had a length overall of 112 metres (367 ft 5.4 in) and 107 m (351 ft 0.6 in) between perpendiculars, a beam of 11.2 m (36 ft 8.9 in) and a draught of 3.4 m (11 ft 1.9 in). Displacement was 1,880 tonnes (1,850 long tons; 2,070 short tons) standard and 2,400 t (2,400 long tons; 2,600 short tons) full load. Power was provided by two Penhoët boilers feeding two de Laval geared steam turbines rated at 44,000 shaft horsepower (33,000 kW) and driving two shafts. Design speed was 35 knots (65 km/h; 40 mph). A single funnel was fitted. 300 long tons (300 t) of oil were carried, giving a design range of 2,500 nautical miles (4,600 km; 2,900 mi) at 20 kn (37 km/h; 23 mph). The ship's complement was 210 officers and ratings.

As-built the armament consisted of four Bofors 120 mm (4.7 in) semi-automatic dual-purpose guns in two twin M/44 dual-purpose mounts on the ship's centreline, one on the forecastle and one aft. The guns could elevate to 80°. Anti-aircraft defense consisted of seven 40 mm (1.6 in) guns in 2 twin water cooled and power operated Hazemeyer stabilized mounts, one twin power operated mount with air cooled guns and one single hand-worked mount at the bow. Twin mountings were protected by splinter shields. Close range AA armament was completed with eight single mounts for Bofors 20 mm M/40 anti-aircraft guns arranged around the forward superstructure and funnel. Within a few years this was reduced to 4. Anti-submarine warfare armament consisted of four depth charge throwers and two depth charge racks.Torpedo armament was based on two triple mounts for 533 mm (21 in) torpedo tubes. The vessel was also equipped for laying mines, carrying 60. Mid-life refits saw the L60 40mm guns replaced by six 40mm L70 guns in single mounts and removal of all 20mm. A Squid ASW mortar was added.

== Construction and career ==
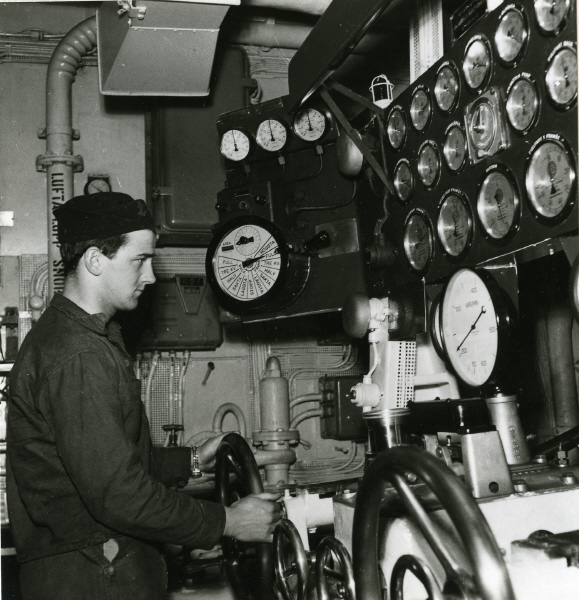
The engine room in Uppland

Uppland was ordered on 26 November 1943 and laid down at the Naval Yard at Karlskrona shortly afterwards. Launched on 15 November 1946, the ship was commissioned on 31 January 1948. The vessel was designed to act as part of a flotilla of destroyers under the command of the light cruisers of the Tre Kronor-class, the last of which had been commissioned during the previous month.

The destroyer underwent upgrades in 1954 and 1963. The latter modernisation was extensive including fitting a new bridge and adding a platform for a helicopter. The light anti-aircraft guns were subsequently removed in 1964. In 1974, the vessel was reclassified as a frigate. In the meantime, sensors had been fitted and, by that year, Uppland was equipped with a Thomson-CSF Saturn S band long range radar, a navigation set and two Hollandse Signaalapparaten M45 fire-control radars.

Meanwhile, in 1972, the Riksdag decided to retire the existing fleet of frigates and cruisers, and focusing instead on a larger number of smaller and more nimble fast attack craft. Uppland was subsequently removed from the Naval List on 1 July 1978. The ship departed from Lysekil on 10 January 1981 and sailed to Gijón, Spain, to be broken up.
