= Öland-class destroyer =

Swedish destroyer class

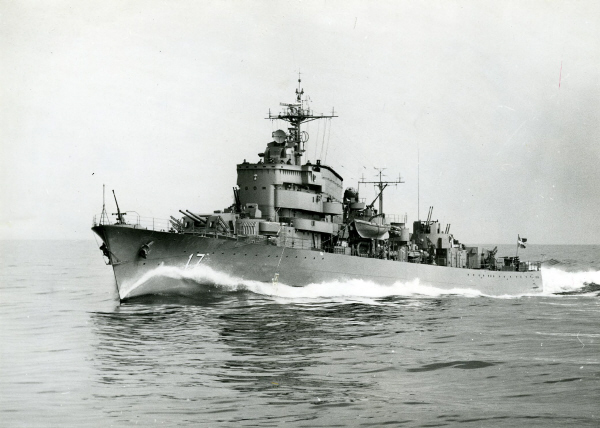
- HSwMS Uppland

Class overview
- Name: Öland class
- Builders: Karlskronavarvet
- Operators: Swedish Navy
- Preceded by: Visby class
- Succeeded by: Halland class
- In commission: 1947-1979
- Planned: 4
- Completed: 2
- Cancelled: 2
- Retired: 2

General characteristics
- Type: Destroyer/Frigate
- Displacement: 1,880-2,250 tons
- Length: 111 m (364 ft)
- Beam: 11.2 m (37 ft)
- Draught: 3.4 m (11 ft)
- Speed: 35 kn (65 km/h; 40 mph)
- Complement: 235
- Armament: 4 × 120 mm (4.7 in)/45 cal Bofors M/44; 7 × 40 mm (1.6 in)/56 cal Bofors lvkan M/36; 6 × 533 mm (21 in) torpedo tubes; 8 × 20 mm (0.79 in)/60 cal Bofors apjäs M/40; Depth charges, mines

The Öland class was a Swedish destroyer class. From 1943 to 1947, two destroyers were constructed, HSwMS Öland and HSwMS Uppland. Originally four ships were planned for the class, but after the end of World War II, two were cancelled. When commissioned the ships were the largest destroyers that had ever served in the Swedish navy. The ships served in the navy until 1979 when the last ship was decommissioned.

== Design ==
The Öland class was 111 metres (364 ft) long and had a displacement of 2,250 tons when fully loaded making it, when commissioned, the largest destroyer class in the navy. Because of their weight the destroyers were constructed with a double hull to withstand damages better. Some parts of the inner hull were made of armor to protect important parts like the engine room.

Main armament was a new pattern of Bofors 120mm semi-automatic gun arranged in a pair of twin high angle mountings making them truly dual purpose.

== Sources ==
- Borgenstam, Curt; Insulander, Per; Kaudern, Gösta (1989), Jagare: med Svenska flottans jagare under 80 år (in Swedish), Västra Frölunda: Marinlitteratur, ISBN 91-970700-4-1, SELIBR 7792227
- von Hofsten, Gustaf; Waernberg, Jan; Ohlsson, Curt S. (2003). Örlogsfartyg: svenska maskindrivna fartyg under tretungad flagg. [Forum navales skriftserie], 1650-1837; [6] (in Swedish). Stockholm: Svenskt militärhistoriskt bibl. i samarbete med Marinlitteratur. ISBN 919743843X. SELIBR 8873330.
- Whitley, M. J. (2000). Destroyers of World War Two: An International Encyclopedia. London: Cassell & Co. ISBN 1-85409-521-8.
