= Torped 613 =

Torped 613 (TP613)
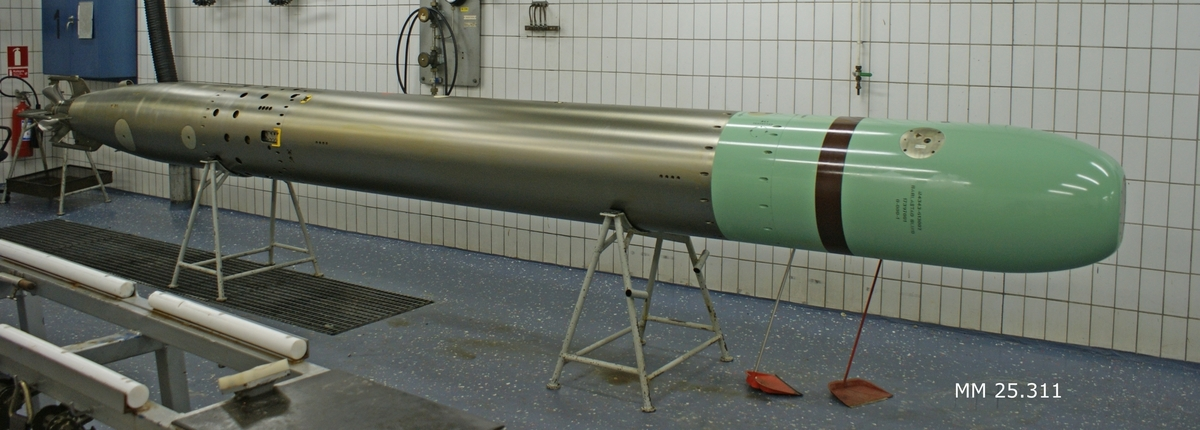
- Type: Heavyweight torpedo
- Place of origin: Sweden

Service history
- In service: 1983–present (Torped 613)
- Used by: Sweden, Norway, Denmark, Poland, Singapore

Production history
- Manufacturer: Förenade Fabriksverken (FFV)

Specifications
- Mass: 1,765 kg (3,891 lb)
- Length: 7.025 m (23 ft 0.6 in)
- Diameter: 533 mm (21 in)
- Warhead: Hexotonal NSL 51
- Warhead weight: 250 kg (550 lb)
- Detonation mechanism: Inertial and proximity
- Engine: Piston engine
- Propellant: Bipropellant HTP/Ethanol
- Operational range: 30 km (16 nmi) low-speed, 20 km (11 nmi) high-speed
- Maximum speed: >45 kn (83 km/h) high-speed
- Guidance system: Wire-guided, acoustic homing, wake homing
- Launch platform: Submarines, MTBs, shore batteries

Torped 613 (TP613) is a heavyweight torpedo still in use by the Swedish Navy.

== Description ==
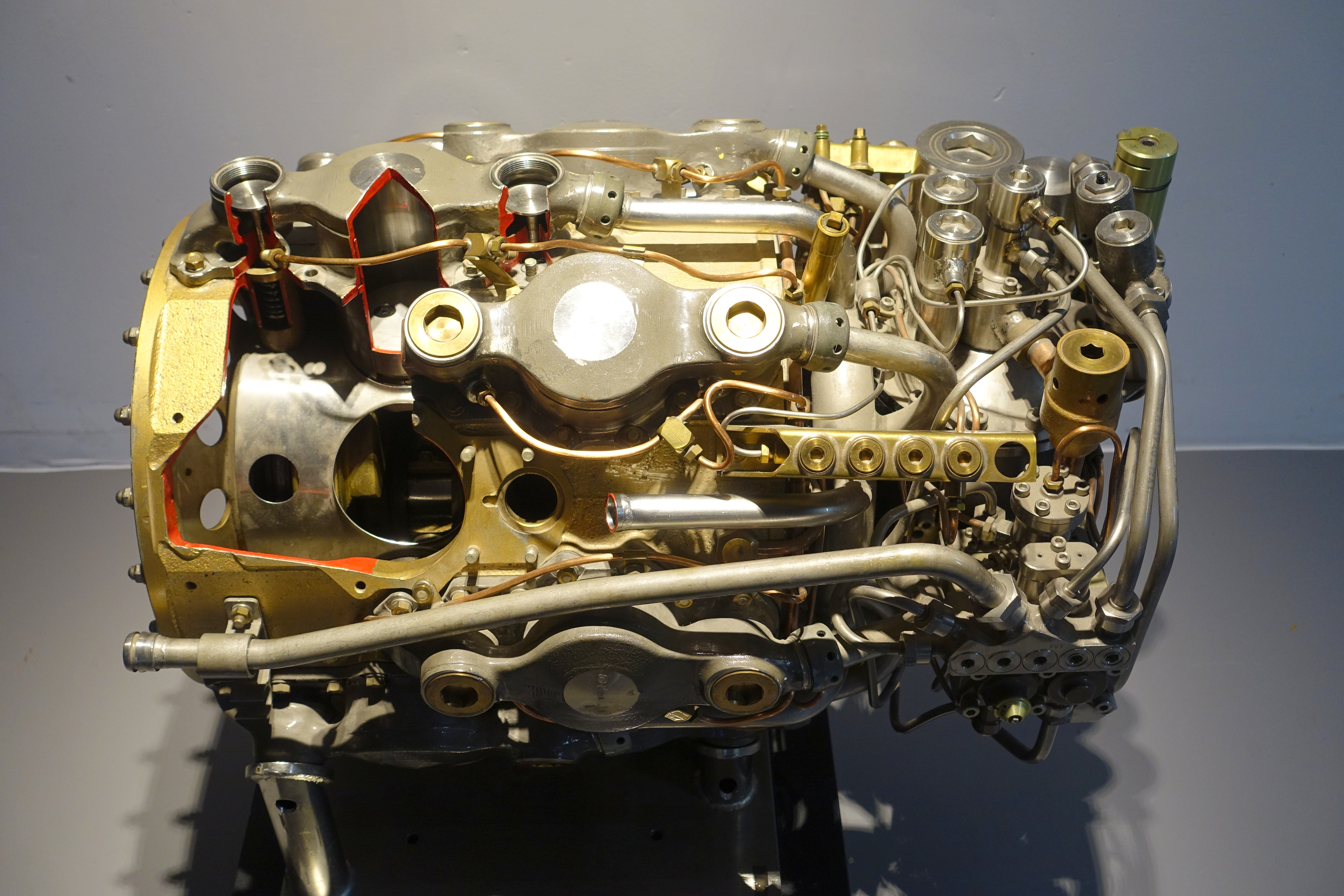
A cutaway demonstrator of the Torped 61 series engine assembly, exhibited at the Marinmuseum.

Torped 613 is wire-guided and has a dual passive and active sonar seeker head that incorporates terminal homing and two-way wire guidance to send back information through the wire. The torpedo was developed during the late 1970s and early 1980s through a collaboration between the navies of Denmark, Norway, and Sweden. Testing was performed between 1981 and 1983, with production beginning in 1983 and the first deliveries following in 1984. Numerous units of TP612 were upgraded into TP613 after its introduction.

Like the older Swedish Torped 61 introduced in 1968, it is driven by a bipropellant piston engine using high-test peroxide and alcohol, which gives long range and a minimum exhaust consisting of water vapor and carbon dioxide. Consequently, the weapon is wakeless.

The torpedo is planned to be replaced by the more modern Torped 62.

Short history of the TP61-series torpedoes:

- TP61, ca 1970 (developed from several previous HTP-propulsioned torpedoes starting in 1955): Straight-running anti-surface torpedo for use with submarines and surface vessels.
- TP611: Wire-guided version of the TP61.
- TP612: Further development of the TP611 with "swim-out" launch from submarine tubes and improved noise-profile.
- TP618, ca 1980: Export version of the TP612 (increased speed and less noise-reduction).
- TP613, ca 1982: Development of the TP612 with passive-hydrophone target-seeker and pistol. Two-way data communications, and engine with two speeds which could be changed during the run.
- TP617, ca 1982: Export version of the TP613, identical, with some degraded parameters in software for hydrophone-control and pistol giving it a slightly reduced performance.

== Operators ==
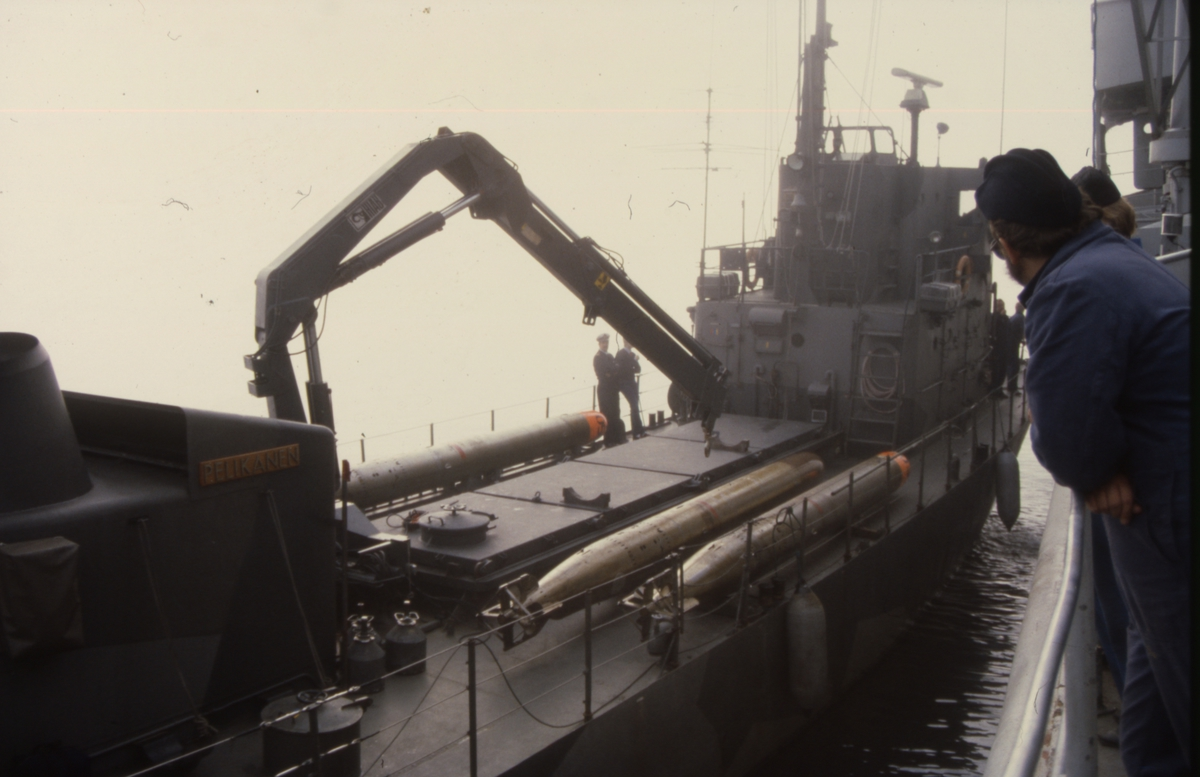
Multiple units of the Torped 613 on the deck of HSwMS Pelikanen

- Swedish Navy
- Royal Norwegian Navy
- Royal Danish Navy
- Polish Navy
- Republic of Singapore Navy

== Bibliography ==
- Klintebo, Roderick (2004). Det svenska ubåtsvapnet, 1904-2004. Forum navales skriftserie, 9 (in Swedish). Stockholm: Literatim. ISBN 978-91-973075-3-6. OCLC 71502578.
