= Middle Army Division =

- Mellersta arméfördelningen
- Active: 1941–1997
- Country: Sweden
- Allegiance: Swedish Armed Forces
- Branch: Swedish Army
- Type: Infantry
- Size: Division
- Part of: Middle Military District (Note: The army division staff was subordinated to the Svea Life Guards (1946–1966), the Life Grenadier Regiment (1966–1984) and the Södermanland Regiment (1984-1994).)
- Garrison/HQ: Linköping
- March: "Svensk lösen" (Modéer) (Note: The march was established on 13 June 1996 by TFG 960005. It was taken over in 2000 by the 1st Mechanized Division (1. mekaniserade divisionen).)

Insignia
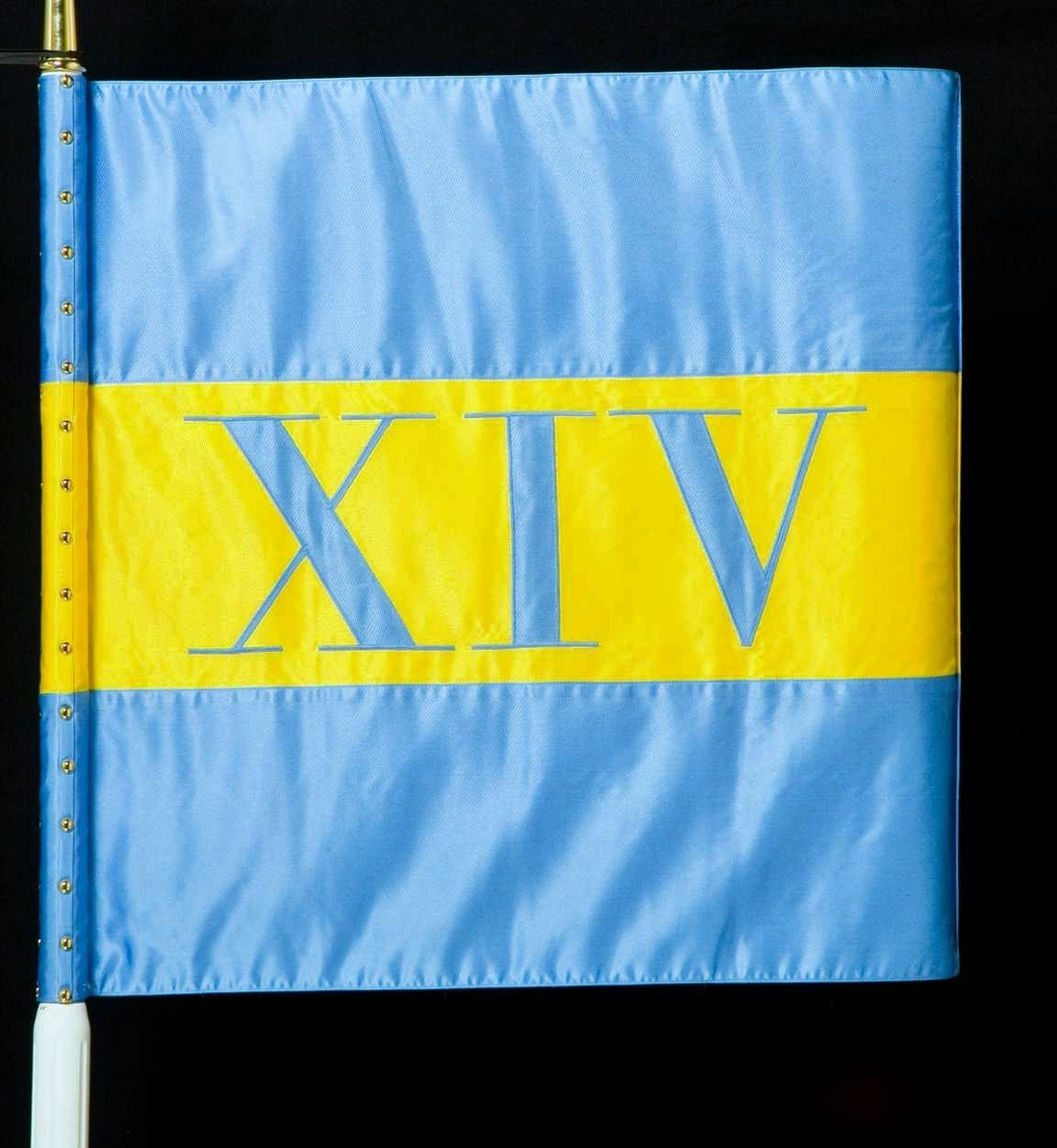
- Standard m/1995

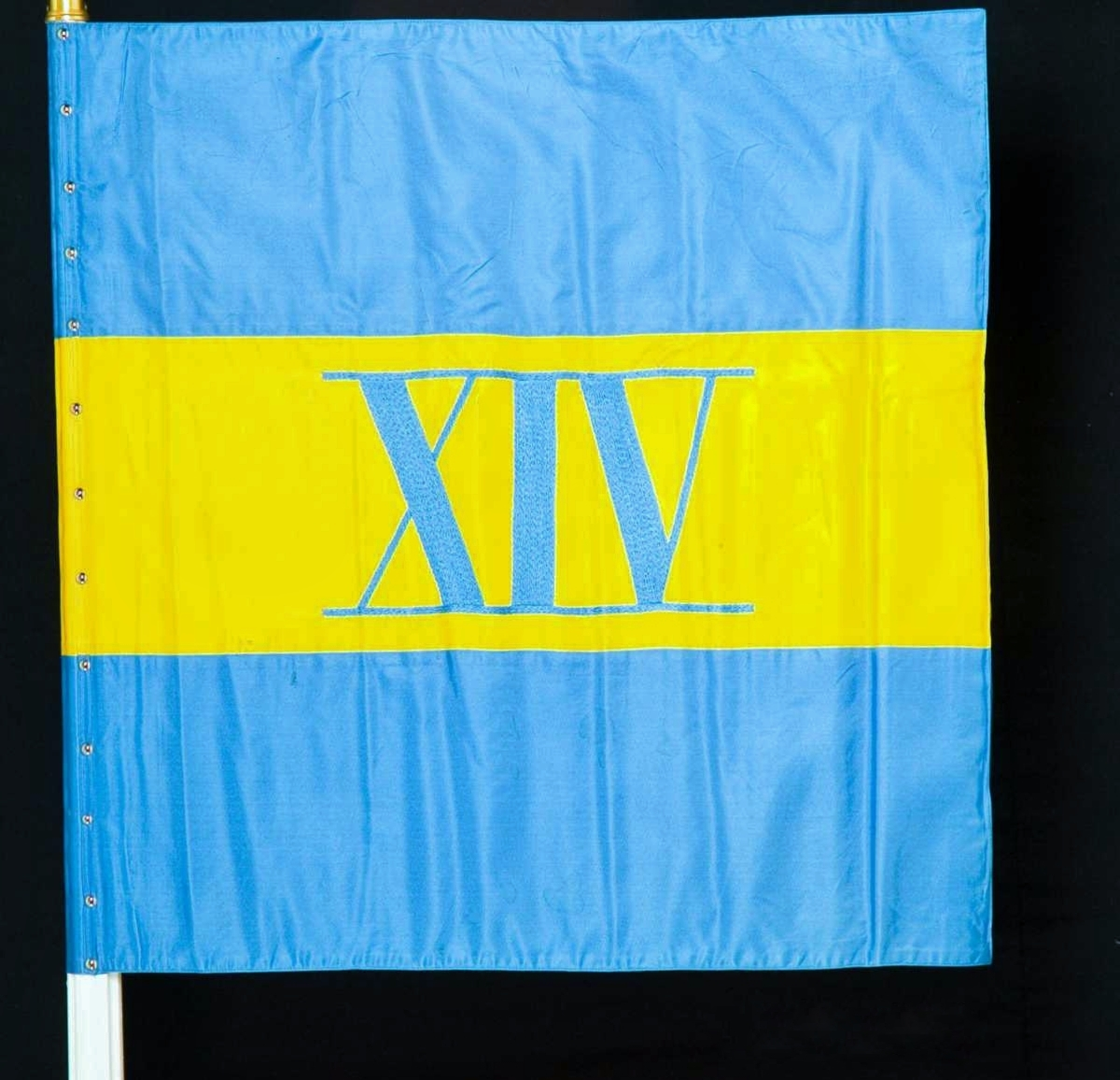
- Standard m/1950

The Middle Army Division (Swedish: Mellersta arméfördelningen, 14. förd), was a division of the Swedish Army which operated in various forms from 1941 to 1997. Its staff was located in Linköping Garrison in Linköping.

== History ==
The Middle Army Division was raised on 1 August 1941 as the XIV Division (XIV. fördelningen), a doubling division of the IV Division. The army division was directly subordinate to the military commander of the IV Military District, while the Svea Life Guards was responsible for raising and mobilization of the army division staff. In 1966, the mobilization responsibility for the army division was transferred to the Life Grenadier Regiment in Linköping. On 1 October 1966, the designation was changed from being given in Roman numerals to Arabic numerals, that is, the division was termed the 14th Division (14. fördelningen). On 1 July 1984, the mobilization responsibility for the army division was transferred to Södermanland Regiment (P 10/Fo 43) in Strängnäs.

On 1 July 1991, the Bergslagen Military District and the Eastern Military District merged and formed the Middle Military District. The army division, together with the Eastern Army Division, thus came to be subordinate to the military commander of the Middle Military District. Through the Defence Act of 1992, the Riksdag decided that the Swedish Armed Forces' war organization should reflect the peace organization. As of 1 July 1994, the army division staff, together with the Eastern Army Division, came to be organized as cadre-organized units within the Middle Military District. With this reorganization, the division was relocated to Linköping Garrison.

Prior to the Defence Act of 1996, the Swedish government proposed to the Riksdag that the war organization to be reduced. Where, among other things, the three military areas would be covered by each division staff. Of the six division staffs, three with division units and 13 army brigades would be maintained. Within the Middle Military District, the government proposed that the Middle Army Division should be disbanded. On 13 December 1996, the Riksdag adopted the government's bill, which meant that the Middle Army Division was disbanded on 31 December 1997.

== Barracks and training areas ==
Although the division was mobilized by other units, it was in peace time grouped together with the military area staff. When the division staff was raised, it came to be co-located with the Eastern Military District Staff at Stureplan in Stockholm. In 1949, the two staffs were moved to the barracks of the Life Regiment of Horse (K 1) at Lidingövägen 28 in Stockholm. On 14 June 1963, both staff were transferred to a new property complex in Strängnäs Garrison. When the staff became independent on 1 July 1994, the staff was placed to the barracks area in Linköping Garrison.

== Heraldry and traditions ==
=== Coat of arms ===
The coat of arms of the Middle Army Division used from 1994 to 1997. Blazon: "Azure, the provincial badge of Östergötland, a griffin with dragon wing and tail or, armed and langued gules. The shield surmounted two batons, charged with open crowns azure in saltire or".

=== Medals ===
In 1995, the Mellersta arméfördelningens förtjänstmedalj ("Middle Army Division Medal of Merit") in silver (MellfördSM) of the 8th size was established. In 1997, this medal was renamed Mellersta fördelningens (14.förd) minnesmedalj ("Middle Division (14.förd) Commemorative Medal") in silver (MellfördSMM). The medal ribbon is blue with red edges followed by a yellow stripe.

== Commanding officers ==
- 1941–1994: ?
- 1994–1996: Senior Colonel Hans Berndtson
- 1996–1997: Lieutenant Colonel Anders Ihrén (acting)

== Names, designations and locations ==
Name	Translation	From		To
XIV. arméfördelningen	XIV Army Division	1941-08-01	–	1966-09-30
14. arméfördelningen	14th Army Division	1966-10-01	–	1994-06-30
Mellersta arméfördelningen	Middle Army Division	1994-07-01	–	1997-12-31
Designation		From		To
XIV. förd		1941-08-01	–	1966-09-30
14. förd		1966-10-01	–	1997-12-31
Location		From		To
Stockholm Garrison		1941-08-01	–	1966-09-30
Linköping Garrison		1966-10-01	–	1984-06-30
Strängnäs Garrison		1984-07-01	–	1994-06-30
Linköping Garrison		1994-07-01	–	1997-12-31

== See also ==
- Division
