= Ivar Holmquist =

Swedish Army officer and sports official

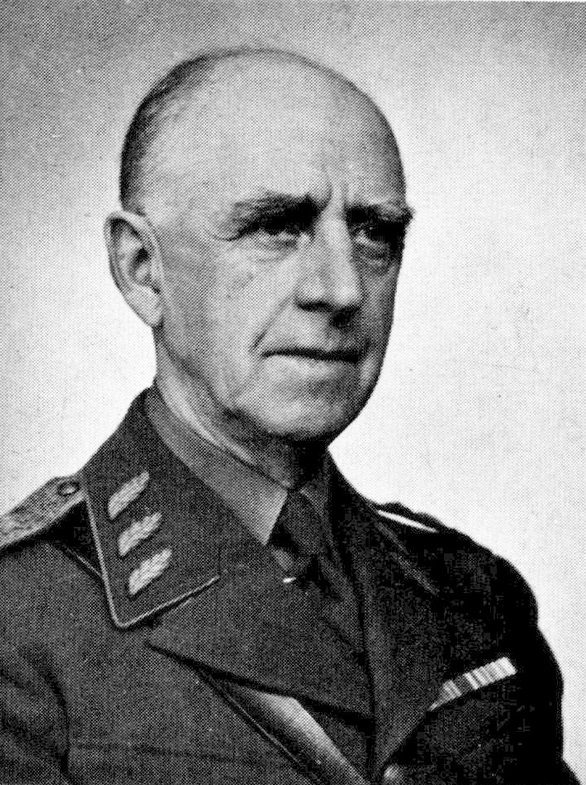
- Born: Carl Axel Fredrik Ivar Holmquist; 22 February 1879; Helsingborg, Sweden
- Died: 24 September 1954 (aged 75); Djursholm, Sweden
- Military career
- Allegiance: Sweden
- Branch: Swedish Army
- Service years: 1899–1944
- Rank: Lieutenant General
- Commands: Norrbotten Regiment; Northern Army Division; II Army Division; Chief of the Army
- Other work: President of FIS (1924–34)

Lieutenant General Carl Axel Fredrik Ivar Holmquist (22 February 1879 – 24 September 1954) was a senior Swedish Army officer and sports official. He was president of the International Ski Federation from 1924 to 1934 and served as Chief of the Swedish Army during World War II.

Holmquist, embarked on a career spanning from his commissioning in 1899 to his tenure as Chief of the Army from 1940 to 1944. Notable milestones include his service in various roles within the Royal Swedish Army Staff College and his command of the Norrbotten Regiment and the Northern Army Division. Rising through the ranks, he attained the position of lieutenant general in 1940. Beyond his military career, Holmquist was deeply involved in sports administration, particularly skiing. He co-founded the International Ski Federation (FIS) and served as its inaugural president from 1924 to 1934. Additionally, he played pivotal roles in promoting cross-country skiing in Sweden and advocating for alpine skiing's introduction in the country. His leadership extended to chairing organizations like the Association for the Promotion of Cross-country Skiing in Sweden and the Norrbotten Landstorm Association. Holmquist's legacy endures through his significant contributions to both the military and sports domains.

== Early life ==
Holmquist was born on 22 February 1879 in Helsingborg, Sweden, the son of Lieutenant General Fredrik Holmquist (1847–1927) and his wife Baroness Cecilia Raab. His uncle was the civil servant Axel Holmquist (1849–1905) and his grandfather was the lawyer Fredrik Holmqvist (1811–1876). He was the brother of lieutenant colonels Hugo Holmquist (1882–1960) and Erik Holmquist (1883–1973).

== Career ==
=== Military career ===
Holmquist was commissioned as an officer and second lieutenant in 1899 and was assigned to Göta Life Guards (I 2) where he became lieutenant in 1903. Holmquist attended the Royal Swedish Army Staff College from 1902 and 1904 and the Firing School in 1904. Holmquist was a cadet of the General Staff from 1905 to 1907, staff adjutant and lieutenant of the General Staff in 1908 and conducted a field trip in Russia the same year. He was a teacher at the Royal Swedish Army Staff College from 1911 to 1917 and captain of the General Staff in 1912. Holmquist was ordered to the Austro-Hungarian Army in 1912 and was captain of the Göta Life Guards in 1917.

In 1918, Holmquist was chief of staff of the Åland detachment and in 1918 and 1919 Holmquist was secretary of the negotiations regarding the demolition of Åland's fortifications. He was staff adjutant and captain of the General Staff in 1919, chief adjutant and major there in 1919 and attended the War College in Paris from 1920 to 1920. Holmquist was an expert at the negotiations of the Åland crisis at the Council of the League of Nations at the Commission of Jurists in Paris and the conference in Geneva in 1921. He was a teacher at the tactical course for captains and cavalry captains in 1921, 1924 and 1925. Holmquist was a teacher at the winter course for officers in 1923 and was head of the same from 1928 to 1930.

Holmquist was a major of the Göta Life Guards in 1924, became lieutenant colonel in 1925 and was appointed colonel and commander of Norrbotten Regiment (I 19) in 1928 and brigade commander of the Northern Army Division in 1934. He was promoted to major general in the Swedish Army in 1935 and was appointed a commander of the II. Army Division in 1937 before being promoted to lieutenant general in 1940. Holmquist was then Chief of the Army from 1940 to 1944.

=== Other work ===
Holmquist was the Swedish Army's representative at the military skiing competition in Oslo in 1930, chairman of the Association for the Promotion of Cross-country Skiing in Sweden, vice chairman of the Swedish Ski Association, chairman of the Norrbotten Landstorm Association, president of the International Ski Federation from 1924 to 1934 and honorary chairman from 1934.

As a sports official, Holmquist was a co-founder of the International Ski Federation (FIS) and he became its first president during the period 1924 to 1934. Since 1900 he was a board member of the Association for Ski Promotion (Skidfrämjandets, now the Swedish Outdoor Association, Friluftsfrämjandet) where he became a long and successful chairman during the years 1923-1950. As such, he was automatically also the vice-president of the Swedish Ski Association (1923–1946). Holmquist worked to introduce alpine skiing in Sweden and was the initiator for the Association for Ski Promotion's facilities in Storlien and Riksgränsen.

== Personal life ==
Holmquist was in his first marriage 1904–1920 married to Thora Nygren (born 1883), daughter of the pharmacist Gottfrid Nygren and Augusta Lyon. They were the parents of Bengt Holmquist (1907–1992). He was in his second marriage 1924–1936 married to Mary Hammarberg (born 1880), daughter of merchant James Hammarberg and Mina Evers. He married for the third time in 1936 with Astrid Minda Bäckström (born 1899), daughter of professor Helge Bäckström and singer Ragnhild Juell.

== Dates of rank ==
- 8 December 1899 – Underlöjtnant
- 26 June 1903 – Lieutenant 2nd Class
- 1 February 1907 – Lieutenant 1st Class
- 25 June 1912 – Captain (General Staff)
- 18 July 1913 – Captain 1st Class (General Staff)
- 24 January 1914 – Captain
- 5 September 1916 – Captain 2nd Class
- 1 January 1917 – Captain 1st Class
- 31 December 1919 – Major
- 17 April 1925 – Lieutenant colonel
- 20 May 1927 – Colonel
- 13 December 1935 – Major general
- 1 October 1940 – Lieutenant general

== Awards and decorations ==
=== Swedish ===
- (Sweden) Commander Grand Cross of the Order of the Sword (15 November 1940)
- (Sweden) Knight of the Order of Vasa (1918)
- (Sweden) Swedish Military Sports Association's Prize Medal in Gold (Sveriges militära idrottsförbunds prismedalj i guld)
- Association for the Promotion of Cross-country skiing in Sweden's gold medal (Föreningens för skidlöpningens främjande i Sveriges guldmedalj)
- (Sweden) Swedish Gymnastic and Sports Clubs' Association's gold medal (Svenska gymnastik- och idrottsföreningarnas riksförbunds guldmedalj)

=== Foreign ===
- (Finland) 1st Class of the Order of the Cross of Liberty with swords and star
- (France) Commander of the Legion of Honour
- Commander of the Order of the Crown of Italy
- (Poland) Commander 2nd Class of the Order of Polonia Restituta
- Commander 2nd Class of the Decoration of Honour for Services to the Republic of Austria
- Knight of the 1st Class of the Order of the White Rose of Finland
- (Russian Empire) 3rd Class Knight of the Order of Saint Stanislaus

== Honours ==
- Member of the Royal Swedish Academy of War Sciences

Sporting positions
Preceded by None	President of the International Ski Federation (FIS); 1924–1934	Succeeded by Nikolai Ramm Østgaard
Military offices
Preceded by Axel Lyström	II Army Division; 1937–1940	Succeeded by Helge Jung
Preceded by Per Sylvan	Chief of the Army; 1940–1944	Succeeded by Archibald Douglas
