= List of presidents of FIS =

The following is a list of presidents of the International Ski and Snowboard Federation (FIS), the world skiing governing body.

#	Name	Nationality	Term
1.	Ivar Holmquist	Sweden	1924–1934
2.	Nicolai Ramm Østgaard	Norway	1934–1951
3.	Marc Hodler	Switzerland	1951–1998
4.	Gian-Franco Kasper	Switzerland	1998–2021
5.	Johan Eliasch	United Kingdom; Sweden	2021-2026
6.	Alexander Ospelt	Liechtenstein	2026-
