= Hans Berndtson =

Swedish Army officer

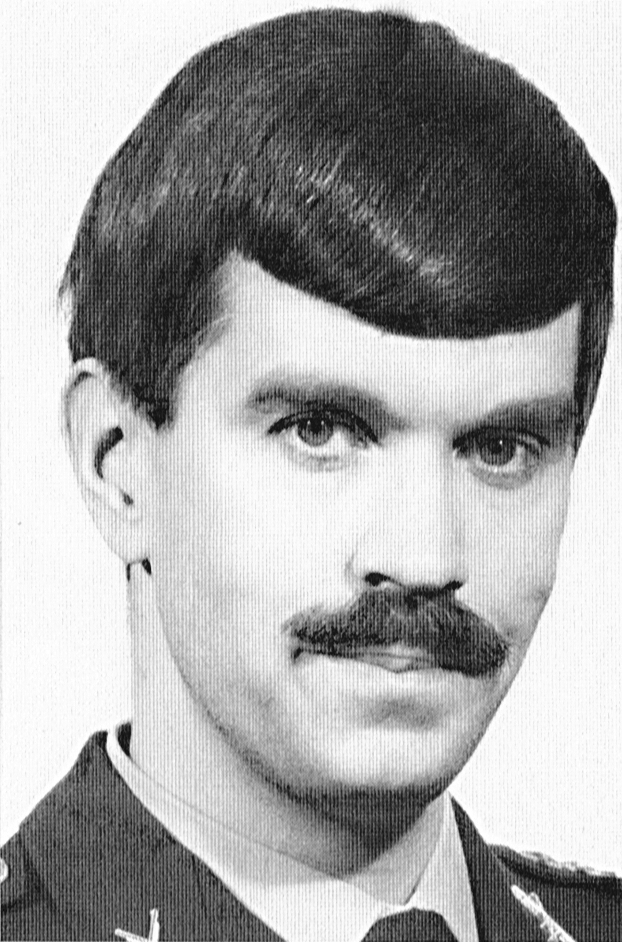
- Berndtson as major.
- Born: Hans Göran Berndtson; 2 July 1945 (age 81); Gothenburg, Sweden
- Military career
- Allegiance: Sweden
- Branch: Swedish Army
- Service years: 1970–2005
- Rank: Lieutenant General
- Commands: Gästrike Brigade; Hälsinge Regiment; Gävleborg Defence District; Middle Army Division; General Training and Management Directorate; Swedish Armed Forces Headquarters; Deputy Supreme Commander

Lieutenant General Hans Göran Berndtson (born 2 July 1945) is a retired Swedish Army officer. His senior commands include commanding officer of the Middle Army Division, head of the General Training and Management Directorate in the Swedish Armed Forces Headquarters and as Deputy Supreme Commander.

== Early life ==
Berndtson was born on 2 July 1945 in Vasa Parish, Gothenburg, Sweden, the son of Birger Berndtson and his wife Ingrid (née Jacobsson). Berndtson passed studentexamen in 1966.

== Career ==
He graduated from the Military Academy Karlberg in 1970 and was promoted the same year to lieutenant in Bohuslän Regiment, where he was promoted to captain in 1973 and served as a platoon leader. Berndtson was educated at the Swedish Infantry Combat School in 1972 and he attended the Higher Staff Course at the Swedish Armed Forces Staff College from 1978 to 1980. At the staff college, Berndtson received its jeton "for particularly good study results" and received a scholarship from the Association KHS Scholarship Fund (Föreningen KHS Stipendiefond) for military science studies abroad. In December 1980, Berndtson, an army officer, was awarded by the Royal Swedish Society of Naval Sciences, which was unusual. Berndtson had written an article about the significance of the Panama Canal for the United States. He was promoted to major in 1981 and entered the General Staff Corps in 1983, and served as a teacher at the vid Swedish Armed Forces Staff College from 1984 to 1986. Berndtson was promoted to lieutenant colonel in the General Staff Corps in 1986, and studied at the Bundeswehr Command and Staff College in Germany from 1986 to 1987, and served in the Dalarna Regiment from 1987 to 1989 and was head of the Planning Department in the Defence Staff from 1989 to 1991.

In 1991, Berndtson was promoted to colonel and appointed commanding officer of the Gästrike Brigade (Gästrikebrigaden). He was promoted to senior colonel in 1993 and then served as commanding officer of the Gävleborg Defence District (Gävleborgs försvarsområde) as well as of the Hälsinge Regiment from 1993 to 1994. Berndtson then served as commanding officer of the Middle Army Division from 1994 to 1996. During the 1990s he also educated himself at the Swedish National Defence College: Higher Operational Management Course in 1993, Main Course in 1994 and the Senior Management Course in 1996. In 1996, Berndtson was promoted to major general and from 1996 to 1998 he served as head of the Supreme Commander's coordination group for implementation of the Defence Act of 1996. He was promoted to lieutenant general in 1998 and was head of the General Training and Management Directorate (Grundorganisationsledningen) in the Swedish Armed Forces Headquarters from 1998 to 2000. From 2001, Berndtson served as Deputy Supreme Commander and head of the Swedish Armed Forces Headquarters. The Swedish government decided on 25 March 2004 that Berndtson would continue to be employed as Deputy Supreme Commander from 1 April 2004 to 31 October 2004. He retired from the Swedish Armed Forces in 2005.

Berndtson has also been an expert in the Swedish Parliamentary Defence Commission (Försvarsberedningen), and chairman of the Swedish Armed Forces Personnel Responsibility Committee (Försvarsmaktens personalansvarsnämnd). He was also a member of the board of the Society and Defence, the Swedish Coast Guard, the Swedish National Board of Psychological Defence (Styrelsen för psykologiskt försvar) and the Stiftelsen Gällöfsta kurscentrum.

== Personal life ==
On 24 October 1981, Berndtson became engaged to Agnetha Linder, the daughter of Olof Linder and his wife Karin (née Wennberg). The banns of marriage was issued on 19 September 1982 and the wedding took place on 9 October 1982 in Lidingö Church.

== Dates of rank ==
- 19?? – Second lieutenant
- 1970 – Lieutenant
- 1973 – Captain
- 1981 – Major
- 1986 – Lieutenant colonel
- 1991 – Colonel
- 1993 – Senior colonel
- 1996 – Major general
- 1998 – Lieutenant general

== Honours ==
- Member of the Royal Swedish Academy of War Sciences (1997)

Military offices
Preceded by Folke Ekstedt	Hälsinge Regiment; Gävleborg Defence District; 1993–1994	Succeeded by Tomas Bornestaf
Preceded by ?	Middle Army Division; 1994–1996	Succeeded by Anders Ihrén as acting
Preceded by None	General Training and Management Directorate; 1998–2000	Succeeded by Bengt-Arne Johansson
Preceded by Frank Rosenius	Swedish Armed Forces Headquarters; 2001–2002	Succeeded by Johan Kihl
Preceded by Frank Rosenius	Deputy Supreme Commander; 2001–2004	Succeeded by None
