= Eastern Army Division =

- Östra arméfördelningen
- Active: 1941–2000
- Country: Sweden
- Allegiance: Swedish Armed Forces
- Branch: Swedish Army
- Type: Infantry
- Size: Division
- Part of: IV Military District (1941–1966); Eastern Military District (1966–1991); Middle Military District (1991–1997)
- Garrison/HQ: Strängnäs
- Motto: Semper primum ("Always first")
- March: "Ryska grenadjärerregementets Konungen av Preussen marsch" (Schubert) (Note: The march was inherited from the Göta Life Guards, and was established on 13 June 1996 by TFG 960005.)

Insignia
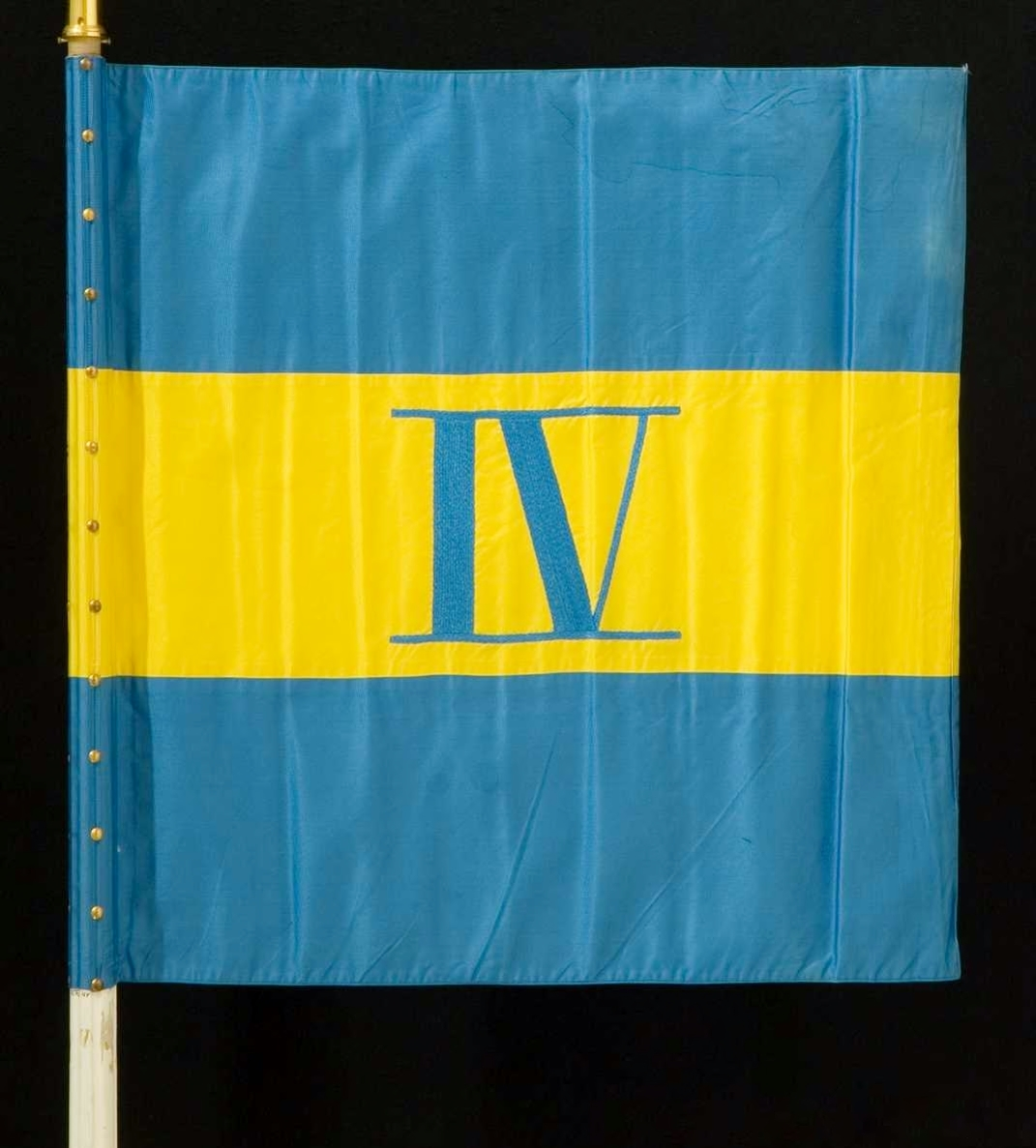
- Command flag

The Eastern Army Division (Swedish: Östra arméfördelningen, 4. förd), was a division of the Swedish Army that operated in various forms from 1941 to 2000. Its staff was located in Strängnäs Garrison in Strängnäs. The unit was disbanded as a result of the disarmament policies set forward in the Defence Act of 2000.

== History ==
The Eastern Army Division was raised on 1 August 1941 as the IV Division (IV. fördelningen). The division was together with the XIV Division directly subordinate to the military commander of the IV Military District, while the Svea Life Guards was responsible for raising and mobilization of the army division staff. In 1957, the mobilization responsibility for the division was transferred to the Göta Life Guards, and in 1970 to the Uppland Regiment. However, the peace organization of the army division was co-located with the military district staff.

On 1 October 1966, the designation was changed from being given in Roman numerals to Arabic numerals, that is, the division was termed the 4th Division (4. fördelningen). On 1 July 1991, the Bergslagen Military District and the Eastern Military District merged and formed the Middle Military District. The army division, together with the Middle Army Division, thus came to be subordinate to the military commander of the Middle Military District. Through the Defence Act of 1992, the Riksdag decided that the Swedish Armed Forces' war organization should reflect the peace organization. As of 1 July 1994, the army division staff, together with the Middle Army Division, came to be organized as cadre-organized units within the Middle Military District.

Prior to the Defence Act of 1996, the Swedish government proposed to the Riksdag that the war organization to be reduced. Where, among other things, the three military districts would be covered by each division staff. Of the six division staffs, three with division units and 13 army brigades would be maintained. Within the Middle Military District, the government proposed that the Middle Army Division should be disbanded. On 13 December 1996, the Riksdag adopted the government's bill, which meant that the Middle Army Division was disbanded on 31 December 1997. By the disbandment of the Middle Army Division, the Eastern Army Division became the only remaining army division in Svealand.

Prior to Defence Act of 2000, the government proposed in its bill to the Riksdag that the tactical level would be reduced by the disbandment of divisions, and defense district staffs as well as naval commands and air force commands. This was to design an Army Tactical Command, Naval Tactical Command and an Air Force Tactical Command which would be co-located with the Joint Forces Command. The proposal meant that all territorial staffs would be disbanded, which meant, among other things, that the three army division staffs were disbanded on 30 June 2000. In its place on 1 July 2000, the 1st Mechanized Division (1. mekaniserade divisionen), was raised which gathered all field units within the army.

== Barracks and training areas ==
Although the division was mobilized by other units, it was in peace time grouped together with the military district staff. When the division staff was raised, it came to be co-located with the Eastern Military District Staff at Stureplan in Stockholm. In 1949, the two staffs were moved to the barracks of the Life Regiment of Horse (K 1) at Lidingövägen 28 in Stockholm. On 14 June 1963, both staff were transferred to a new property complex in Strängnäs Garrison, where it was located in various forms until 2005.

== Heraldry and traditions ==
=== Coat of arms ===
The coat of arms of the Eastern Army Division used from 1994 to 2000. Blazon: "Or, from a wavy base azure, a demigriffon issuant sable, armed and langued gules. The shield surmounted two batons, charged with open crowns azure in saltire or".

=== Medals ===
In 2000, the Östra arméfördelningens (4.förd) minnesmedalj ("Eastern Army Division (4.förd) Commemorative Merit") in silver (ÖFördSMM) of the 8th size was established. The medal ribbon is of blue moiré with a broad red stripe on the middle followed on both sides by a white line and with two yellow lines on each side.

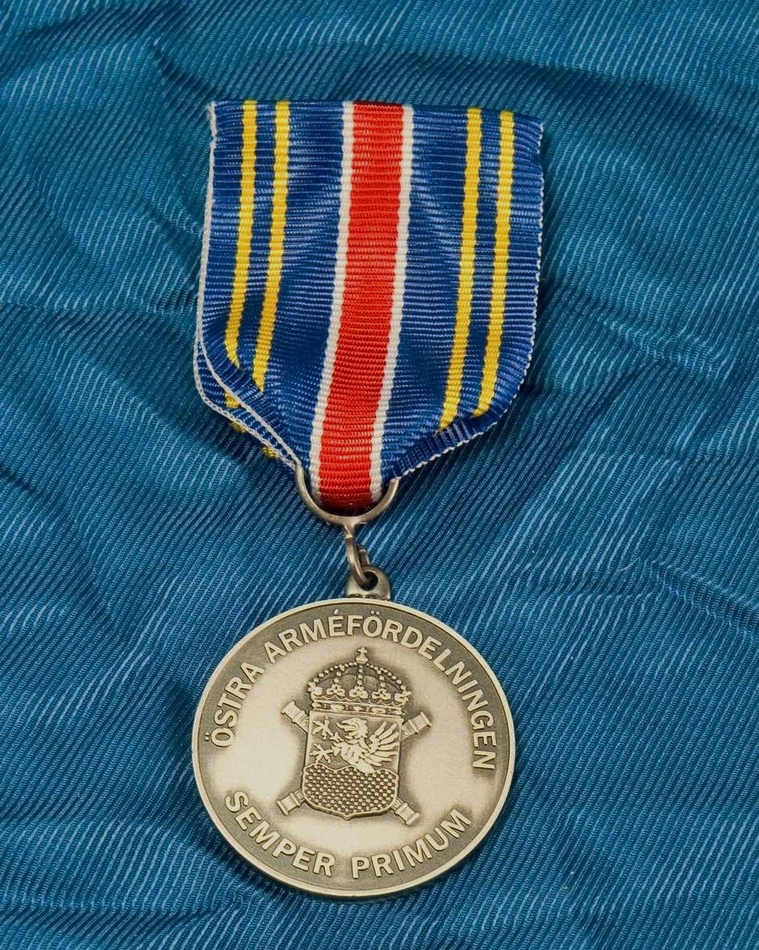
Eastern Army Division Commemorative Merit.

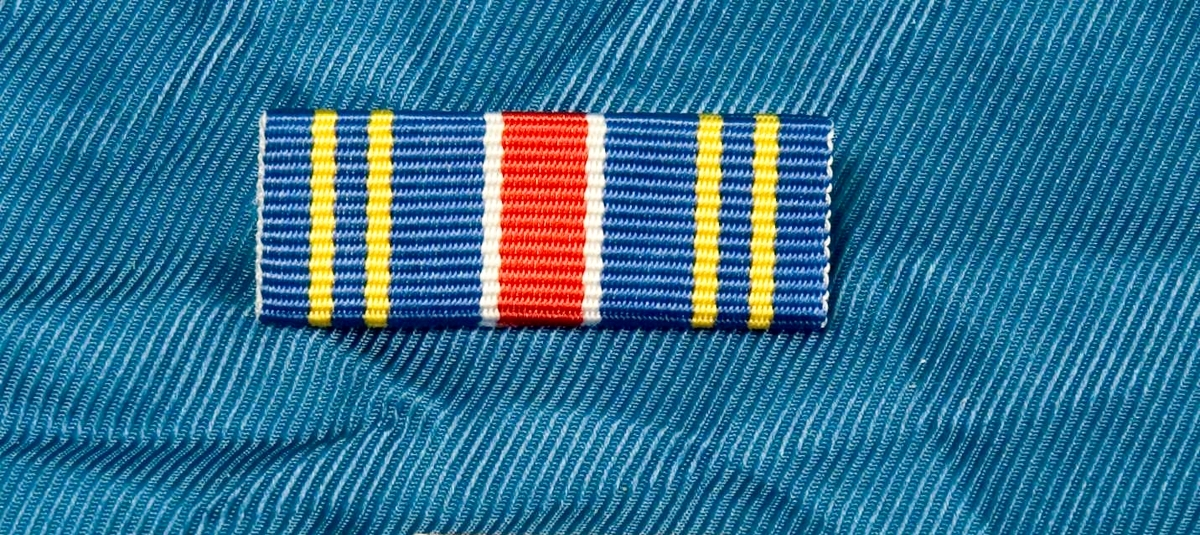
Ribbon.

== Commanding officers ==
- 1941–1968: ?
- 1968–1970: Colonel Nils Östlund
- 1970–1976: Senior Colonel Sten Ljungqvist
- 1976–1979: Senior Colonel Bengt Selander
- 1979–1990: Senior Colonel Åke Lundin
- 1990–1994: Senior Colonel Nils Rosenqvist
- 1994–1999: Senior Colonel Ulf Henricsson
- 1999–2000: Senior Colonel Roland Ekenberg

== Names, designations and locations ==
| Name | Translation | From | | To |
|---|---|---|---|---|
| IV. fördelningen | IV Division | 1941-08-01 | – | 1966-09-30 |
| 4. arméfördelningen | 4th Army Division | 1966-10-01 | – | 1994-06-30 |
| Östra arméfördelningen | Eastern Army Division | 1994-07-01 | – | 2000-06-30 |
| Designation | | From | | To |
| IV. förd | | 1941-08-01 | – | 1966-09-30 |
| 4. förd | | 1966-10-01 | – | 2000-06-30 |
| Location | | From | | To |
| Stockholm Garrison | | 1941-08-01 | – | 1963-06-13 |
| Strängnäs Garrison | | 1963-06-14 | – | 2000-06-30 |

== See also ==
- Division
