= Mats Welff =

Swedish Army officer

- Born: Mats Håkan Ingemar Welff; 12 July 1947 (age 79); Landskrona, Sweden
- Military career
- Allegiance: Sweden
- Branch: Swedish Army
- Service years: 1970–2002
- Rank: Major General
- Commands: Malmö Brigade; Nordbat 1 Halland Regiment; Halland Defence District; Southern Army Division; Chief of Staff, Milo S Chief of Home Guard
- Conflicts: Yugoslav Wars

Major General Mats Håkan Ingemar Welff (born 12 July 1947) is a retired Swedish Army officer. Welff began his military career as a second lieutenant in the Swedish Army in 1970 and steadily rose through the ranks. He attended the Swedish Armed Forces Staff College and served in different roles within the military, including commanding the Malmö Brigade and the 1st Nordic Battalion in UNPROFOR in the Balkans. Notably, he commanded the Halland Regiment and Halland Defence District as well as the Southern Army Division. Welff served as the Chief of Home Guard from 2000 to 2002. He retired as a major general in 2002 and subsequently worked as a regional director in the Scania Regional Council from 2002 to 2007.

== Early life ==
Welff was born on 12 July 1947 in Landskrona Parish in Landskrona, Malmöhus County, Sweden, the son of Ingemar Welff, and engineer, and his wife Maj (née Agnell). He grew up in the neighborhood of Slottsstaden in Malmö and passed studentexamen in 1966.

== Career ==
Welff completed his officer's training at the Military Academy Karlberg in Stockholm in 1970 and was commissioned as an officer in the Swedish Army the same year and was assigned as a second lieutenant in the Göta Life Guards, where he served from 1970 to 1972. Welff was promoted to lieutenant at the North Scanian Regiment in 1972 and to captain there in 1973, serving at the regiment until 1979. From 1979 to 1981, Welff attended the Higher Course at the Swedish Armed Forces Staff College and was promoted to major in 1981, after which he served on the staff of the Southern Military District from 1981 to 1983. He was the department head at the Army Staff from 1984 to 1986.

In 1986, Welff was promoted to lieutenant colonel and served as the head of the Land Operations Department at the staff of the Southern Military District from 1986 to 1988. He then served as the deputy chief of the Operations Directorate in the Southern Military District from 1988 to 1989. He was promoted to lieutenant colonel with a special position in 1989 and attended the International Training Course in Security and Disarmament in Geneva from 1989 to 1990. Following this, he was the commander of the Basic Training Battalion at the South Scanian Regiment from 1990 to 1991.

In 1991, Welff was promoted to colonel and served as the commander of the Malmö Brigade from 1991 to 1994. From 1993 to 1994, he also served as the commander of the 1st Nordic Battalion (Nordbat 1), which was part of the United Nations Protection Force (UNPROFOR) in Macedonia. He was promoted to senior colonel in 1995 and served as the head of the Strategy Department in the Planning Staff at Swedish Armed Forces Headquarters from 1995 to 1996. He then served as the commander of the Halland Regiment and the Defence District Commander of the Halland Defence District from 1996 to 1998. He was also the commander of the Southern Army Division from 1998 to 2000, concurrently serving as the chief of staff in the Southern Military District from 1999 to 2000.

Welff was promoted to major general and served as the Chief of Home Guard from 1 July 2000, to 30 September 2002. Welff retired from active service in 2002 and then worked as the regional director in the Scania Regional Council from 2002 to 2007. He was chairman of the National Swedish Defence Society (Allmänna försvarsföreningen) in Scania from 2012 to 2017.

== Personal life ==
In 1971, Welff married Birgitta Andersson (born 1947), the daughter of foreman Ivar Andersson and Greta (née Andersson).

== Dates of rank ==
- 1970 – Second lieutenant
- 1972 – Lieutenant
- 1973 – Captain
- 1981 – Major
- 1986 – Lieutenant colonel
- 1989 – Överstelöjtnant med särskild tjänsteställning
- 1991 – Colonel
- 1995 – Senior colonel
- 2000 – Major general

== Honours ==
- Member of the Royal Swedish Academy of War Sciences (1992)

== Bibliography ==
- Welff, Mats (2021). Krigsförbrytaren [The War Criminal] (in Swedish). Lund: Ekström & Garay. ISBN 9789189397439. SELIBR 4jgctfwf2mrtqgj2.
- Welff, Mats, ed. (2011). Södra skåningarna 200 år: [1811-2011] (in Swedish). Staffanstorp: Södra skåningarnas kamratförening. ISBN 9789163387135. SELIBR 12278947.
- Rosander, Lars; Welff, Mats (1982). Det hemliga kriget. Andra världskriget (Bokorama), 99-0235234-0 (in Swedish). Höganäs: Bokorama/Wiken. ISBN 9170240728. SELIBR 7591422.

Military offices
Preceded by Peter Jonsson	Halland Regiment Halland Defence District; 1996–1998	Succeeded by Arne Hedman
Preceded by Björn Hedskog	Southern Army Division; 1998–2000	Succeeded by None
Preceded by Ulf Rubarth	Chief of Staff, Southern Military District; 1999–2000	Succeeded by None
Preceded by Alf Sandqvist	Chief of Home Guard; 2000–2002	Succeeded by Anders Lindström
