= Western Army Division =

- Västra arméfördelningen
- Active: 1941–1997
- Country: Sweden
- Allegiance: Swedish Armed Forces
- Branch: Swedish Army
- Type: Infantry
- Size: Division
- Part of: III Military District (1941–1966); Western Military District (1966–1993); Southern Military District (1993–1997)
- Garrison/HQ: Skövde Garrison
- March: "I fält" (Rydberg) (Note: The march was established on 13 June 1996 by TFG 960005.)

Insignia
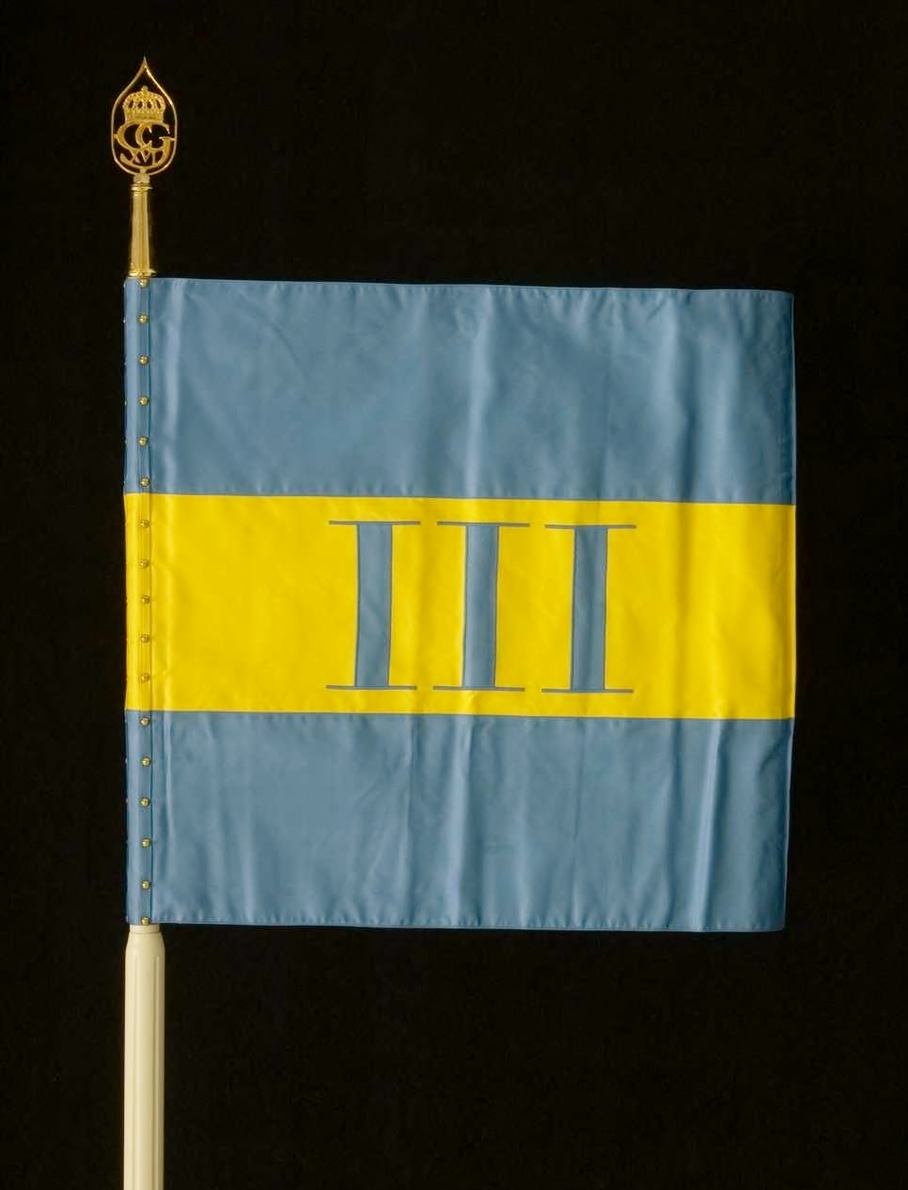
- Command flag

The Western Army Division (Swedish: Västra arméfördelningen, 3. förd), was a division of the Swedish Army that operated in various forms from 1941 to 1997. Its staff was located in Skövde garrison in Skövde.

== Heraldry and traditions ==
=== Coat of arms ===
The coat of arms of the Western Army Division used from 1994 to 1997. Blazon: "Azure, a double-tailed lion rampant or, armed and langued gules. The shield surmounted two batons, charged with open crowns azure in saltire or".

=== Medals ===
In 1997, the Västra arméfördelningens (3.förd) minnesmedalj ("Western Army Division (3.förd) Commemorative Merit") in silver (VFördSMM) of the 8th size was established. The medal ribbon is of green moiré with white edges followed by a blue stripe.

== Commanding officers ==
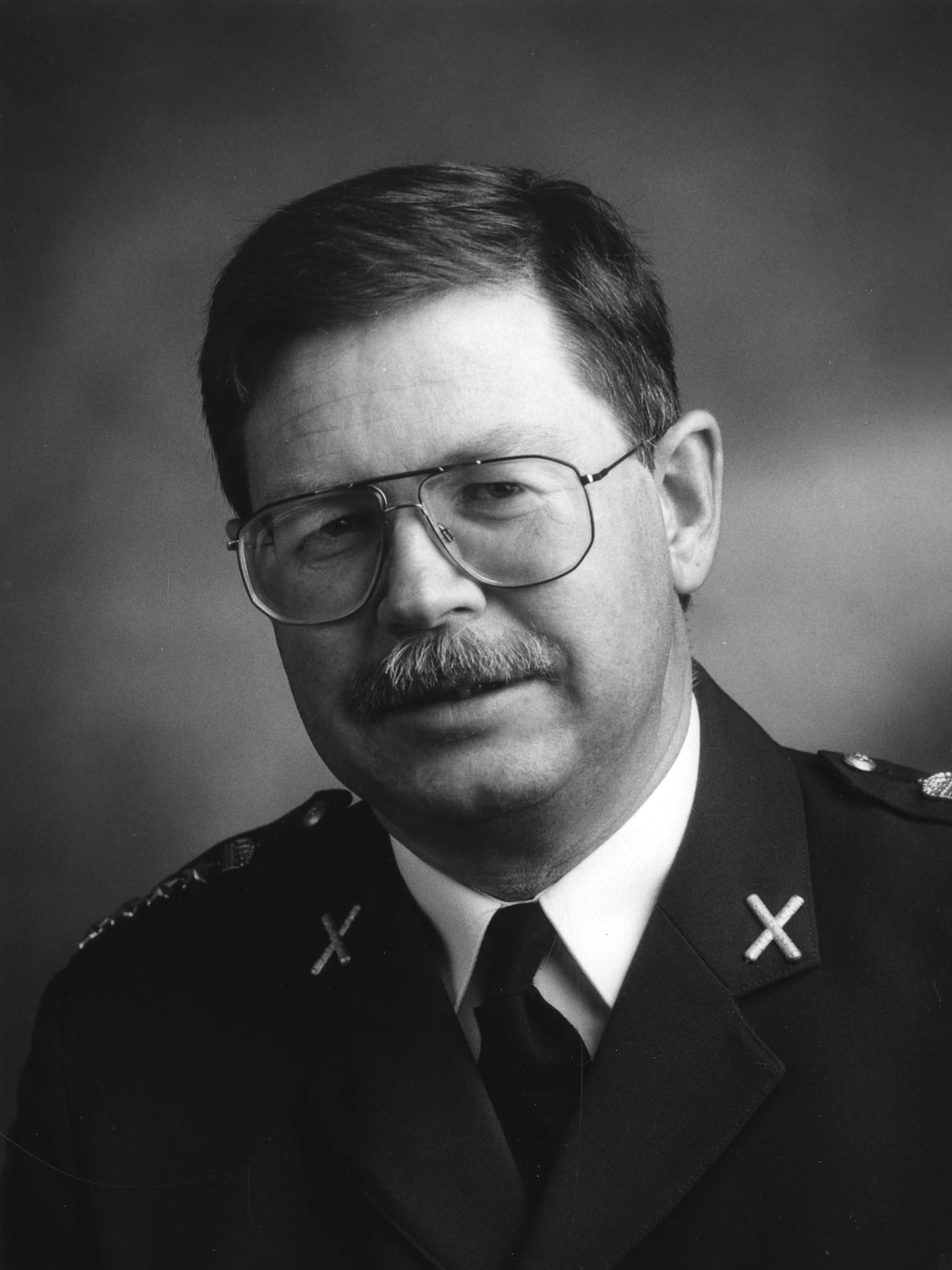
Senior colonel Johan Hederstedt as commander (1993–1996).

- 1941–1981: ?
- 1981–1991: Senior colonel Leif Kesselmark
- 1991–1993: Senior colonel Per Källström
- 1993–1996: Senior colonel Johan Hederstedt
- 1995–2000: Senior colonel Sven-Eric Andersson

== Names, designations and locations ==
Name	Translation	From		To
III. fördelningen	III Division	1941-08-01	–	1966-09-30
3. arméfördelningen	3rd Army Division	1966-10-01	–	1994-06-30
Västra arméfördelningen	Western Army Division	1994-07-01	–	1997-12-31
Designation		From		To
III. förd		1941-08-01	–	1966-09-30
3. förd		1966-10-01	–	1997-12-31
Location		From		To
Skövde Garrison		1941-08-01	–	1997-12-31

== See also ==
- Division
