= Southern Army Division =

- Södra arméfördelningen
- Active: 1941–2000
- Country: Sweden
- Allegiance: Swedish Armed Forces
- Branch: Swedish Army
- Type: Infantry
- Size: Division
- Part of: Skaraborg Regiment (1946–1984); North Scanian Regiment (1984–1994); Southern Military District (1994–2000)
- Garrison/HQ: Kristianstad
- March: "Kavalleri V" (Lidner) (Note: The march was established on 13 June 1996 by TFG 960005.)

The Southern Army Division (Swedish: Södra arméfördelningen, 13. förd), was a division of the Swedish Army that operated in various forms from 1941 until 2000. Its staff was located in Kristianstad Garrison in Kristianstad. The unit was disbanded as a result of the disarmament policies set forward in the Defence Act of 2000.

== Heraldry and traditions ==
=== Coat of arms ===
The coat of arms of the Eastern Army Division used from 1994 to 2000. Blazon: "Sable, the front of a tank with three bolts coming from each side of the turret, or. The shield surmounted two batons or, charged with open crowns azure, in saltire or."

=== Medals ===
In 2000, the Södra arméfördelningens (13.förd) minnesmedalj ("Southern Army Division (13.förd) Commemorative Merit") in silver (SFördSMM) of the 8th size was established. The medal ribbon is of black moiré with blue lines at the edges and two yellow lines on the middle.

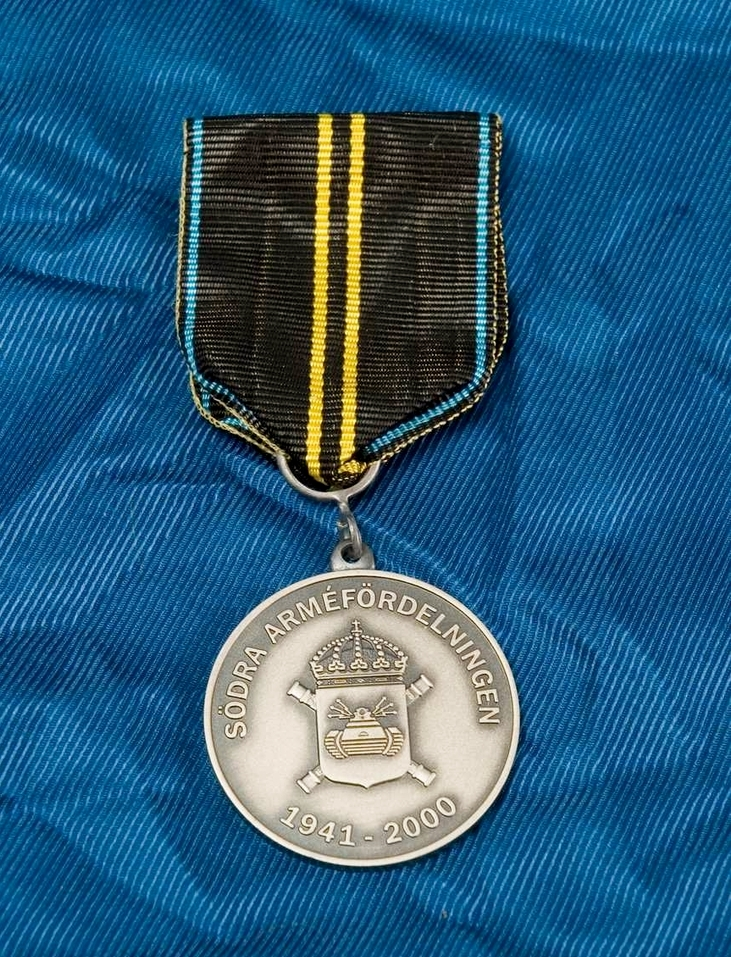
Southern Army Division Commemorative Merit.

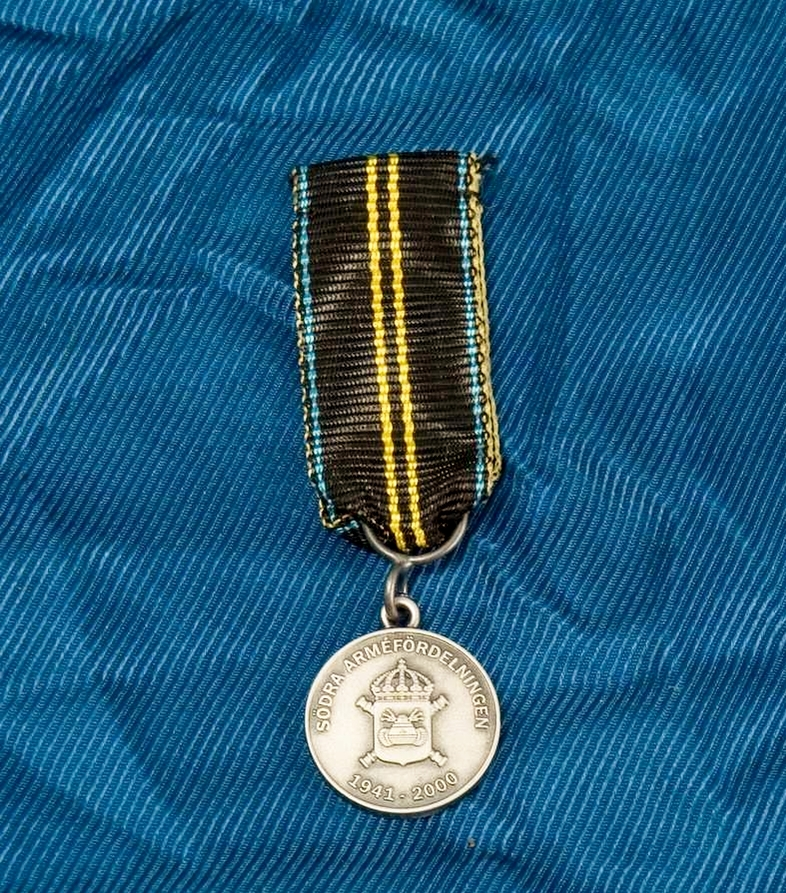
Southern Army Division Commemorative Merit (miniature model).

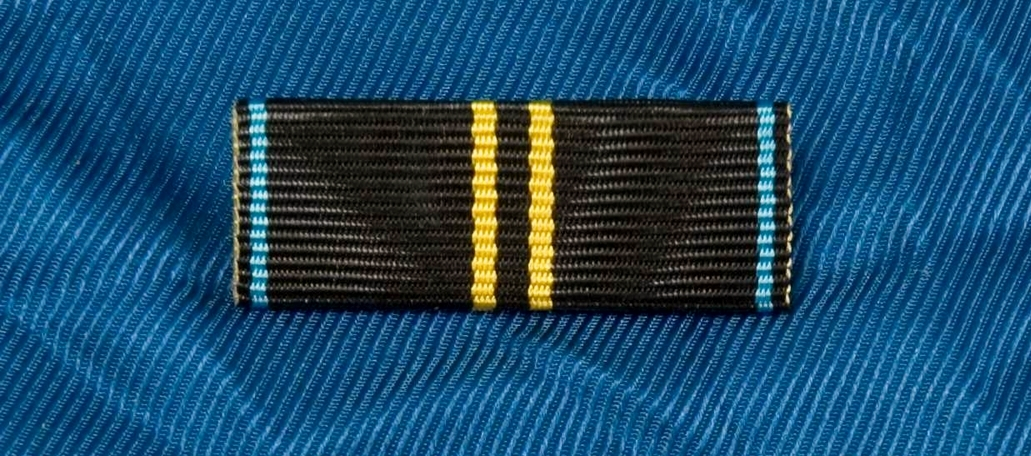
Ribbon.

== Commanding officers ==
- 1994–1995: Senior Colonel Håkan Waernulf
- 1995–1998: Senior Colonel Björn Ivar Hedskog
- 1998–2000: Senior Colonel Mats Welff

== Names, designations and locations ==
| Name | Translation | From | | To |
|---|---|---|---|---|
| XIII. arméfördelningen | XIII Army Division | 1941-08-01 | – | 1966-09-30 |
| 13. arméfördelningen | 13th Army Division | 1966-10-01 | – | 1994-06-30 |
| Södra arméfördelningen | Southern Army Division | 1994-07-01 | – | 1997-12-31 |
| Designation | | From | | To |
| XIII. förd | | 1941-08-01 | – | 1966-09-30 |
| 13. förd | | 1966-10-01 | – | 1997-12-31 |
| Location | | From | | To |
| Skövde garrison | | 1941-08-01 | – | 1984-06-30 |
| Kristianstad Garrison | | 1984-07-01 | – | 2000-06-30 |

== See also ==
- Division
