= Lower Northern Army Division =

- Nedre norra arméfördelningen
- Active: 1941–1997
- Country: Sweden
- Allegiance: Swedish Armed Forces
- Branch: Swedish Army
- Type: Infantry
- Size: Division
- Part of: II Military District (1941–1966); Lower Norrland Military District (1966–1993); Northern Military District (1993–1997)
- Garrison/HQ: Östersund
- March: "General Toll" (Kjellberg) (Note: The march was established on 13 June 1996 by TFG 960005.)

Insignia
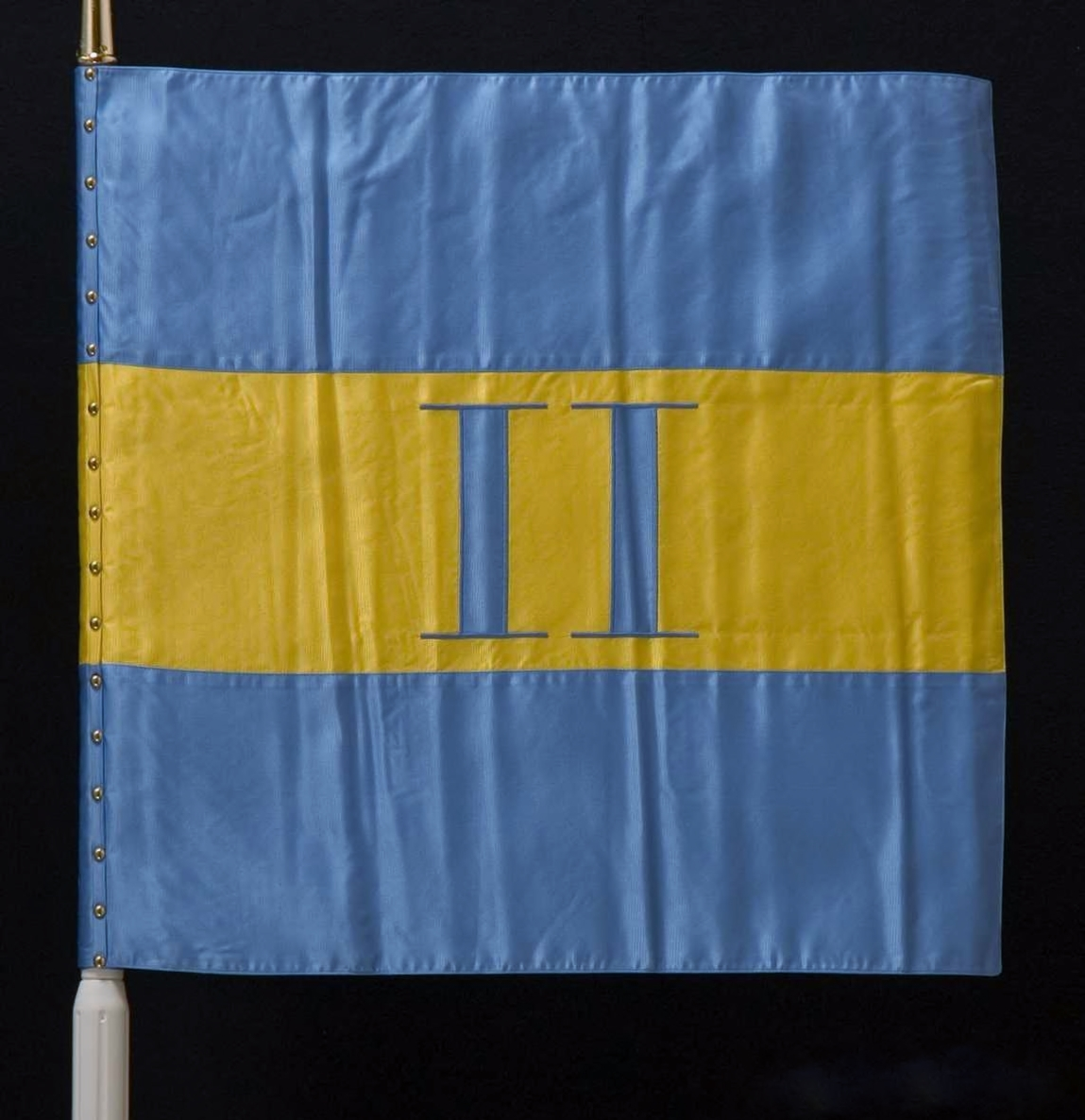
- Command flag

The Lower Northern Army Division (Swedish: Nedre norra arméfördelningen, 2. förd), was a division of the Swedish Army which operated in various forms from 1941 to 1997. Its staff was located in Östersund Garrison in Östersund.

== History ==
The Lower Northern Army Division was raised on 1 August 1941 as the XII Division (XII. fördelningen), a doubling division of the II Army Division (II. arméfördelningen). The army division was directly subordinate to the military commander of the II Military District, while the Jämtland Ranger Regiment was responsible for raising and mobilization of the army division staff. On 1 October 1966, the designation was changed from being given in Roman numerals to Arabic numerals, that is, the division was termed the 12th Division (12. fördelningen). Through the Defence Act of 1977 it was decided that the army would be reduced in 1978 with two army divisions, thereby disbanding the 2nd Army Division (2. arméfördelningen) and the 16th Army Division (16. arméfördelningen). On 1 July 1993, the Lower Norrland Military District and the Upper Norrland Military District (Milo ÖN) were merged and formed the Northern Military District (Milo N). The army division, together with the Upper Northern Army Division, thus came under the military commander of the Northern Military District (Milo N).

Through the Defence Act of 1992, the Riksdag decided that the Swedish Armed Forces' war organization should reflect the peace organization. As of 1 July 1994, the army division staff, together with the Upper Northern Army Division, came to be organized as a cadre-organized unit within the Northern Military District. With the new organization, the army division adopted the name Lower Northern Army Division (2. förd). Prior to the Defence Act of 1996, the Swedish government proposed to the Riksdag that the war organization to be reduced. Where, among other things, the three military districts would be covered by each division staff. Of the six division staffs, three with division units and 13 army brigades would be maintained. Within the Northern Military District, the government proposed that the Lower Northern Army Division should be disbanded. On 13 December 1996, the Riksdag adopted the government's bill, which meant that the Lower Northern Army Division was disbanded on 31 December 1997.

== Barracks and training areas ==
The division staff was initially located at Prästgatan in Östersund. In December 1993, the staff was moved to the former administrative building of Norrland Artillery Regiment, where it remained until it was disbanded on 30 June 1997.

== Heraldry and traditions ==
=== Coat of arms ===
The coat of arms of the Eastern Army Division used from 1994 to 1997. Blazon: "Fess wavy vert, argent and azure; argent charged with a wolf passant sable. The shield surmounted two batons or, charged with open crowns azure in saltire."

=== Medals ===
In 1997, the Nedre norra fördelningens (2.förd) minnesmedalj ("Lower Northern Army Division (2.förd) Commemorative Merit") in silver (NednorrFördSMM) of the 8th size was established. The medal ribbon is divided in green, white and blue moiré.

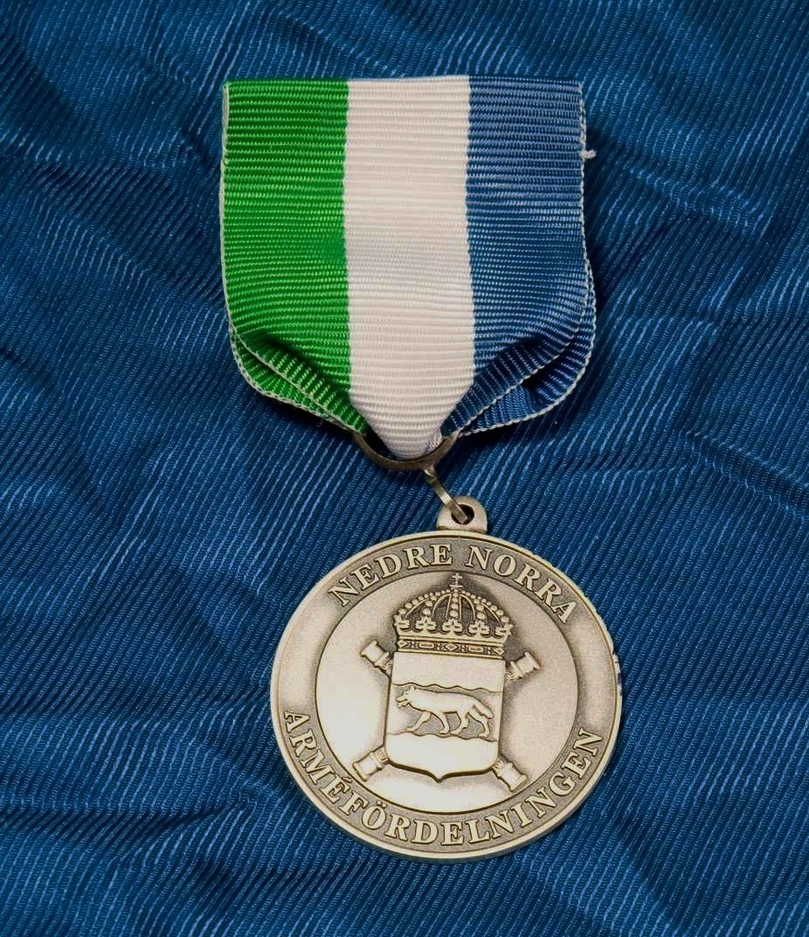
Lower Northern Army Division Commemorative Merit.

== Commanding officer ==
- 1943–1995: ?
- 1995–1997: Senior Colonel Björn Karlsson

== Names, designations and locations ==
Name	Translation	From		To
XII. fördelningen	XII Division	1941-08-01	–	1966-09-30
12. arméfördelningen	12th Army Division	1966-10-01	–	1994-06-30
Nedre norra arméfördelningen	Lower Northern Army Division	1994-07-01	–	1997-12-31
Designation		From		To
XII. förd		1941-08-01	–	1966-09-30
12. förd		1966-10-01	–	1994-06-30
2. förd		1994-07-01	–	1997-12-31
Location		From		To
Östersund Garrison		1941-08-01	–	1997-12-31

== See also ==
- Division
