= Division (Sweden) =

An army division or division (Swedish: Arméfördelning or Fördelning) was during the 1900s in the Swedish Army a designation for a larger military unit, comprising two or more brigades, an artillery regiment, an engineer battalion, an anti-aircraft battalion, a signal battalion and a transport battalion. An arméfördelning corresponds to a division in many countries' armies, and it has been common to also use the word "division" in Swedish when referring to foreign rather than Swedish military units.

== History ==
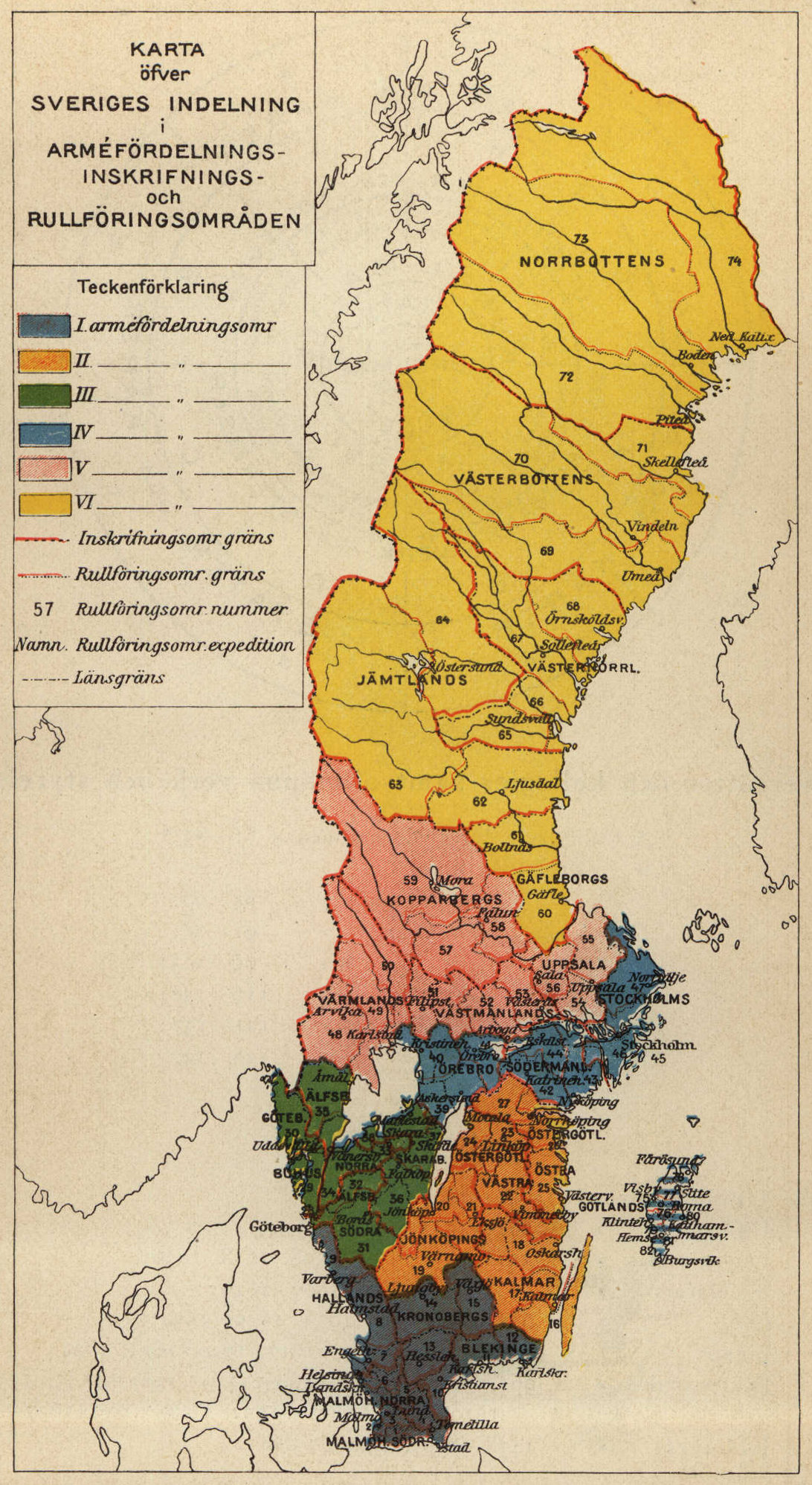
Army division areas of the Swedish Army in 1908.

The concept of arméfördelning ("army division"), originally only fördelning ("division") began to be used after the beginning of the 19th century, and was introduced in 1889 as a term also in the peace-time organization. Through the 1892 and 1897 changes made in the organization of the army, the artillery was also placed under the commanding officers of the army divisions. An army division then, apart from some exceptions, consisted of four infantry, one cavalry and one artillery regiment, and one service corps, for which at war, engineer troops were added. The army division was intended for independent operations, but lacks complete administrative bodies in peacetime. Sweden was divided into six army division areas in 1904, with command offices in Helsingborg (1st), Linköping (2nd), Skövde (3rd), Stockholm (4th and 5th) and Härnösand (6th).

The army divisions replaced the peacetime subdivision of military districts that was used in the years 1833–1888. In 1889–1892, the territorial territory of the army division was called military district, but this was abolished from 1893 when the territorial territory of an army division was named army division area (arméfördelningsområde).

Through the Defence Act of 1942, the I-IV Military Districts came to mobilize two divisions each, while the V and VI Military Districts each mobilized one army division. On 1 October 1966, the Roman numerals in the designation of the army divisions was changed to Arabic numerals. Through the Defence Act of 1977, the army divisions were reduced by two staffs. Through 1988 Defense Investigation, the army divisions were reduced by two staffs. Through the Defence Act of 1996, the army divisions were reduced by three staffs, since the three military districts would mobilize one army division each. The last three army divisions were disbanded and replaced by the 1st Mechanized Division (1. mekaniserade divisionen) through the Defence Act of 2000, and the 1st Mechanized Division disbanded through the Defence Act of 2004.

== Divisions ==
=== 1893–1901 ===
The 1893 subdivision was operational from 1 October of that year. From 1898, Roman numerals was used.

English name	Swedish name	Location	Active
1st Army Division; I Army Division	1. arméfördelningen I. arméfördelningen	Helsingborg Garrison	1893–1901
2nd Army Division; II Army Division	2. arméfördelningen II. arméfördelningen	Eksjö Garrison; Linköping Garrison	1893–1894; 1894–1901
3rd Army Division; III Army Division	3. arméfördelningen III. arméfördelningen	Skövde Garrison	1893–1901
4th Army Division; IV Army Division	4. arméfördelningen IV. arméfördelningen	Stockholm Garrison	1893–1901
5th Army Division; V Army Division	5. arméfördelningen V. arméfördelningen	Stockholm Garrison	1893–1901
6th Army Division; VI Army Division	6. arméfördelningen VI. arméfördelningen	Gävle Garrison; Härnösand Garrison	1893–1894; 1894–1901

=== 1902–1927 ===
The 1902 subdivision was operational from 1 January of that year.

English name	Swedish name	Location	Active
I Army Division	I. arméfördelningen	Helsingborg Garrison	1902–1927
II Army Division	II. arméfördelningen	Linköping Garrison	1902–1927
III Army Division	III. arméfördelningen	Skövde Garrison	1902–1927
IV Army Division	IV. arméfördelningen	Stockholm Garrison	1902–1927
V Army Division	V. arméfördelningen	Stockholm Garrison	1902–1927
VI Army Division	VI. arméfördelningen	Härnösand Garrison; Östersund Garrison	1902–1910; 1910–1927

=== 1928–1936 ===
The 1928 subdivision was operational from 1 January of that year.

English name	Swedish name	Location	Active
Northern Army Division	Norra arméfördelningen	Östersund Garrison	1928–1936
Eastern Army Division	Östra arméfördelningen	Stockholm Garrison	1928–1936
Western Army Division	Västra arméfördelningen	Skövde Garrison	1928–1936
Southern Army Division	Södra arméfördelningen	Helsingborg Garrison	1928–1936

=== 1937–1942 ===
The 1937 subdivision was operational from 1 January of that year.

English name	Swedish name	Location	Active
I Army Division	I. arméfördelningen	Helsingborg Garrison; Kristianstad Garrison	1937–1939; 1939–1942
II Army Division	II. arméfördelningen	Östersund Garrison	1937–1942
III Army Division	III. arméfördelningen	Skövde Garrison	1937–1942
IV Army Division	IV. arméfördelningen	Stockholm Garrison	1937–1942

=== 1943–1966 ===
The 1943 subdivision was operational from 7 February of that year.

Designation	English name	Swedish name	Military district	Location	Active
I. förd	I Army Division	I. arméfördelningen	I Military District	Kristianstad Garrison	1942–1966
II. förd	II Army Division	II. arméfördelningen	II Military District	Östersund Garrison	1942–1966
III. förd	III Army Division	III. arméfördelningen	I Military District	Skövde Garrison	1942–1966
IV. förd	IV Army Division	IV. arméfördelningen	IV Military District	Strängnäs Garrison	1942–1966
XI. förd	XI Army Division	XI. arméfördelningen	I Military District	Ystad Garrison	1942–1966
XII. förd	XII Army Division	XII. arméfördelningen	II Military District	Östersund Garrison	1942–1966
XIII. förd	XIII Army Division	XIII. arméfördelningen	I Military District	Kristianstad Garrison	1942–1966
XIV. förd	XIV Army Division	XIV. arméfördelningen	IV Military District	Linköping Garrison	1942–1966
XV. förd	XV Army Division	XV. arméfördelningen	VI Military District	Boden Garrison	1942–1966
XVI. förd	XVI Army Division	XVI. arméfördelningen	V Military District	Karlstad Garrison	1942–1966

=== 1966–1994 ===
Designation	English name	Swedish name	Military district	Location	Active
1. förd	1st Army Division	1. arméfördelningen	Southern Military District	Kristianstad Garrison	1966–1991
2. förd	2nd Army Division	2. arméfördelningen	Lower Norrland Military District	Östersund Garrison	1966–1978
3. förd	3rd Army Division	3. arméfördelningen	Southern Military District	Skövde Garrison	1966–1994
4. förd	4th Army Division	4. arméfördelningen	Middle Military District	Strängnäs Garrison	1966–1994
11. förd	11th Army Division	11. arméfördelningen	Southern Military District	Ystad Garrison	1966–1991
12. förd	12th Army Division	12. arméfördelningen	Lower Norrland Military District	Östersund Garrison	1978–1994
13. förd	13th Army Division	13. arméfördelningen	Southern Military District	Skövde/Kristianstad Garrison	1966–1997
14. förd	14th Army Division	14. arméfördelningen	Middle Military District	Linköping/Strängnäs Garrison	1966–1994
15. förd	15th Army Division	15. arméfördelningen	Upper Norrland Military District	Boden Garrison	1966–1994
16. förd	16th Army Division	16. arméfördelningen	Bergslagen Military District	Karlstad Garrison	1966–1978

=== 1994–2000 ===
Designation	English name	Swedish name	Military district	Location	Active
2. förd	Lower Northern Army Division	Nedre norra arméfördelningen	Northern Military District	Östersund Garrison	1994–1997
3. förd	Western Army Division	Västra arméfördelningen	Southern Military District	Skövde Garrison	1994–1997
4. förd	Eastern Army Division	Östra arméfördelningen	Middle Military District	Strängnäs Garrison	1994–2000
6. förd	Upper Northern Army Division	Övre norra arméfördelningen	Northern Military District	Boden Garrison	1994–1997
6. förd	Northern Army Division	Norra arméfördelningen	Northern Military District	Boden Garrison	1997–2000
13. förd	Southern Army Division	Södra arméfördelningen	Southern Military District	Kristianstad Garrison	1994–2000
14. förd	Central Army Division	Mellersta arméfördelningen	Middle Military District	Linköping Garrison	1994–1997

== See also ==
- Military district (Sweden)
