= Sigurd (disambiguation) =

Sigurd is a legendary hero of Germanic mythology.

Sigurd may also refer to:

- Sigurd (name)
- Sigurd the Crusader, king of Norway
- Sigurd (opera), an opera by Ernest Reyer
- Sigurd, Utah, a town in Sevier County, Utah, United States
- The main character of the first generation in the video game Fire Emblem: Genealogy of the Holy War
- Kamen Rider Sigurd, a character from the TV series Kamen Rider Gaim

== See also ==
- Siward (disambiguation), English equivalent to Sigurd
