= Vice admiral (Sweden) =

Rank in the Swedish Navy

- Flag of the vice admiral, Swedish Navy.

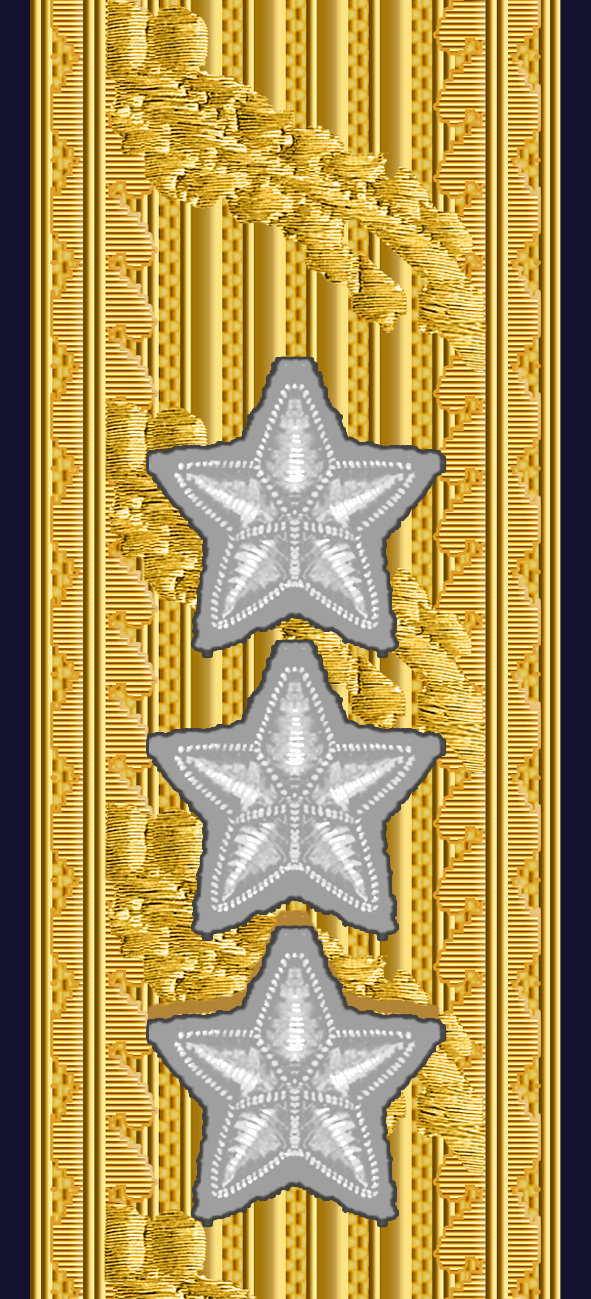
- Shoulder mark of a Swedish three-star vice admiral.

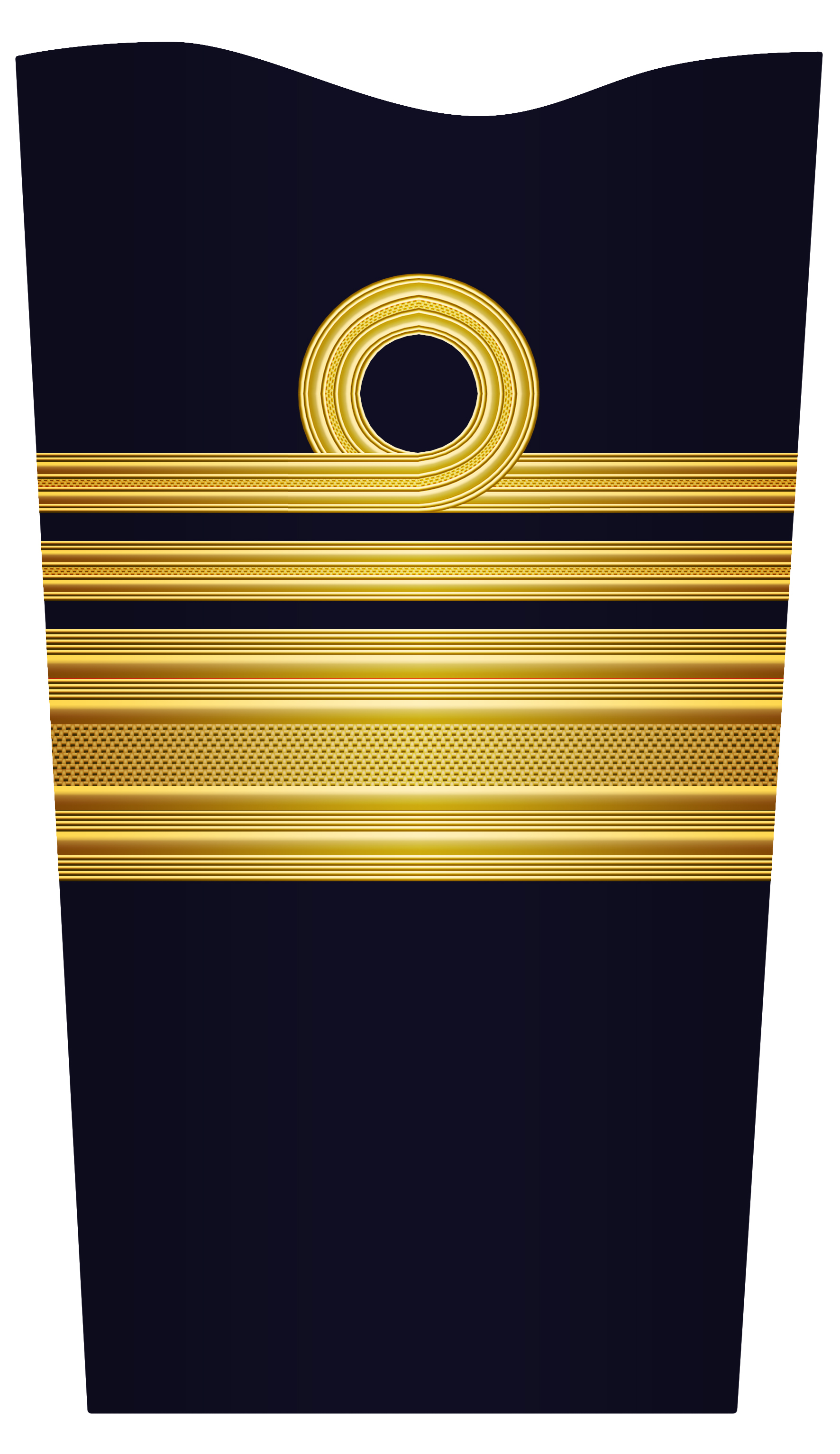
- Sleeve insignia of a Swedish three-star vice admiral.
- Country: Sweden
- Service branch: Swedish Navy
- Abbreviation: Vam (Swedish), VAdm (English)
- Rank: Three-star (Note: Vice admiral was a two-star rank until 1972 and admiral was the three-star rank in the Swedish Armed Forces rank structure.)
- NATO rank code: OF-08
- Non-NATO rank: O-9
- Formation: 1575
- Next higher rank: Admiral
- Next lower rank: Rear admiral
- Equivalent ranks: Lieutenant general

Vice admiral (VAdm; Swedish: Viceamiral, Vam) is a three-star commissioned naval officer rank in the Swedish Navy. Vice admiral ranks above rear admiral and below admiral. Vice admiral is equivalent to the rank of lieutenant general.

== History ==
In Sweden, the admiral's rank first appeared during the reign of Gustav I, who in 1522 gave it to Erik Fleming, a Council of the Realm. During Gustav's reign as king and throughout the latter part of the 16th century, the highest command of a fleet was led by a översteamiral ("colonel admiral"), to whose assistant a underamiral was appointed. It was not until 1569 that a permanent översteamiral was appointed; In 1602 the title was exchanged for riksamiral ("Admiral of the Realm"). The first permanent underamiral was appointed in 1575; his office ceased in 1619. Vice admiral is first mentioned in 1577. The admirals of the Swedish Navy have, incidentally, been as follows: generalamiral ("general admiral"), amiralgeneral ("admiral general"), storamiral ("grand admiral"), överamiral, riksviceamiral ("Vice Admiral of the Realm"), amiralgenerallöjtnant ("admiral lieutenant general"), amirallöjtnant ("lieutenant admiral"), schoutbynacht and konteramiral ("rear admiral"). Vice admirals were in ancient times called lieutenant admirals. Between 1680 and 1771, vice admiral ranked between admiral and schoutbynacht. It was then replaced by rear admiral.

When the vice admiral was commander of the squadrons, he carried the Swedish naval ensign with two white stars in the lower blue field as a sign of command. Vice admiral is equivalent to the rank of lieutenant general in the Swedish Army, the Swedish Air Force, the Swedish Coastal Artillery (until 2000) and as well as in the Swedish Amphibious Corps (from 2000). Historically, the Chief of the Navy (1936–1994) and the Chief of Navy Staff (1994–1998) positions was a flag officer with the rank of vice admiral. Historically, during the 20th century, vice admirals were promoted one grade upon retirement to full four-star admiral. The last time this happened was in 1991 when vice admiral Bror Stefenson was promoted to admiral in connection with his retirement from the navy. According to current practice only royals and the Supreme Commander of the Swedish Armed Forces, if he were to come from the Swedish Navy, can hold the rank of a full, four-star, admiral in Sweden.

Following a proposal from the Swedish Armed Forces, the Government of Sweden decides on employment as a vice admiral.

In everyday speech, vice admirals are addressed as admirals.

== Uniform ==
=== Shoulder mark ===
The shoulder mark of a Swedish vice admiral contains a 45 mm galloon m/51 and three (Note: Three stars has been used for a vice admiral since 1972. Before that it was two stars.) 25 mm star m/30 in silver embroidery on a white background: The center distance between the stars on the shoulder mark must be 27 mm.

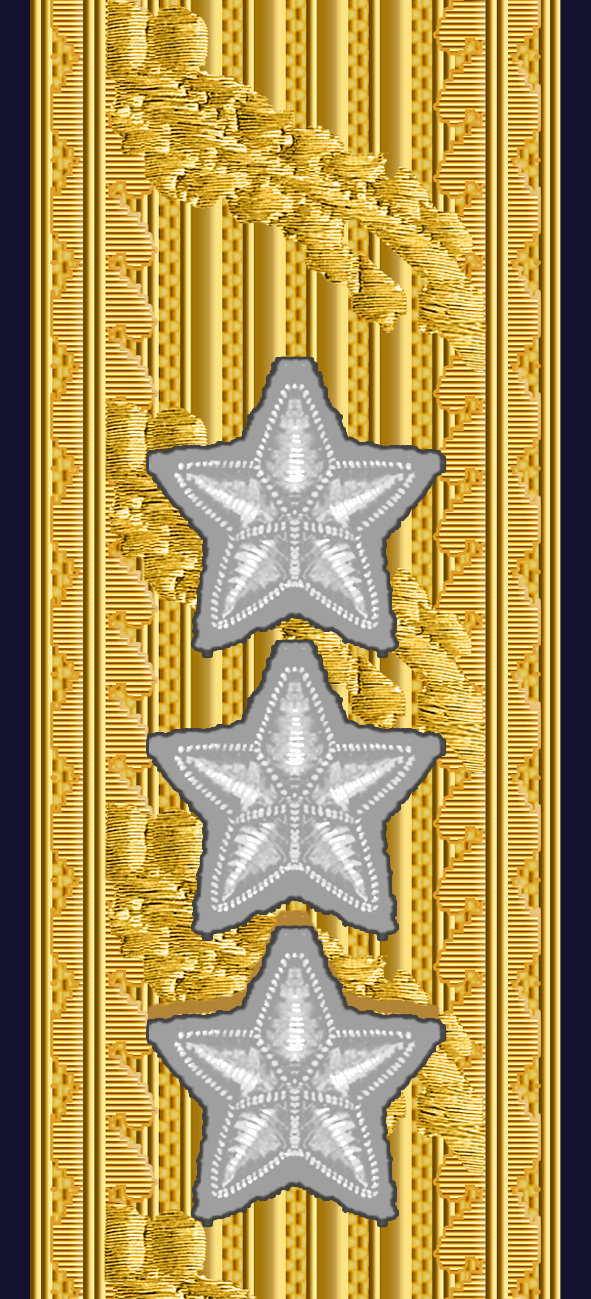
Shoulder mark of a Swedish vice admiral (1972–present)

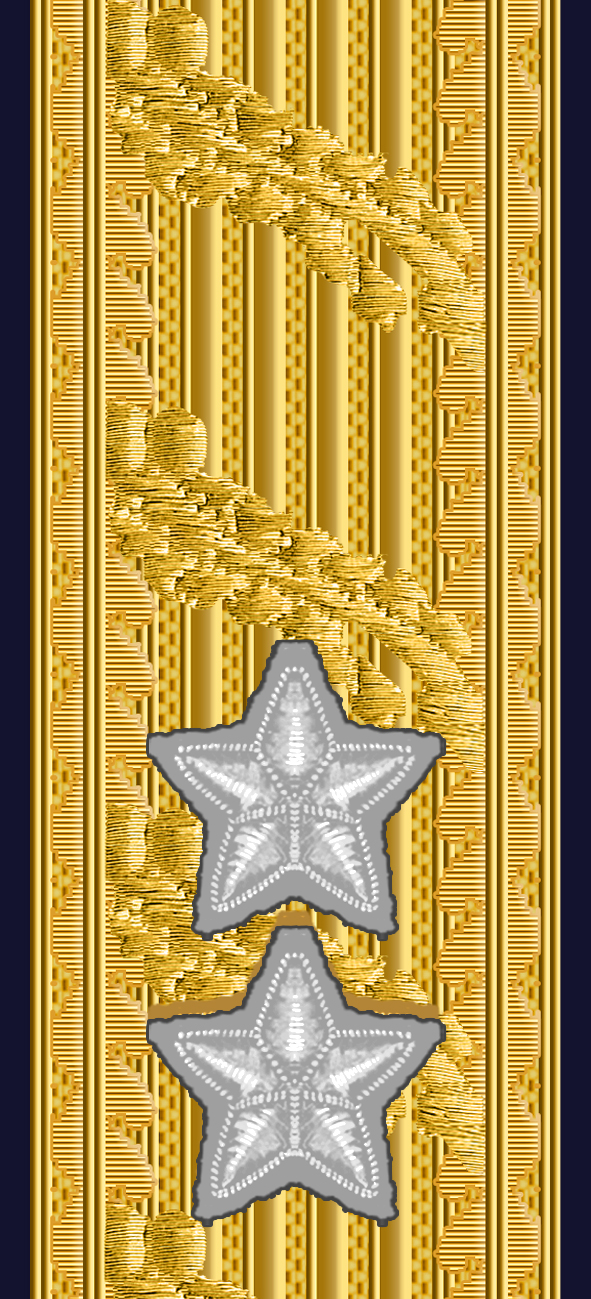
Shoulder mark of a Swedish vice admiral (1878–1972)

=== Sleeve insignia ===
A flag officer wears on the sleeves a 45 mm galloon (GALON M/51 45MM K) and a rank insignia (GRADBETECKNING M/02 TILL ÄRM FLOTTAN) (round loop, the Amphibious Corps has a pointed loop in form of a grenade).

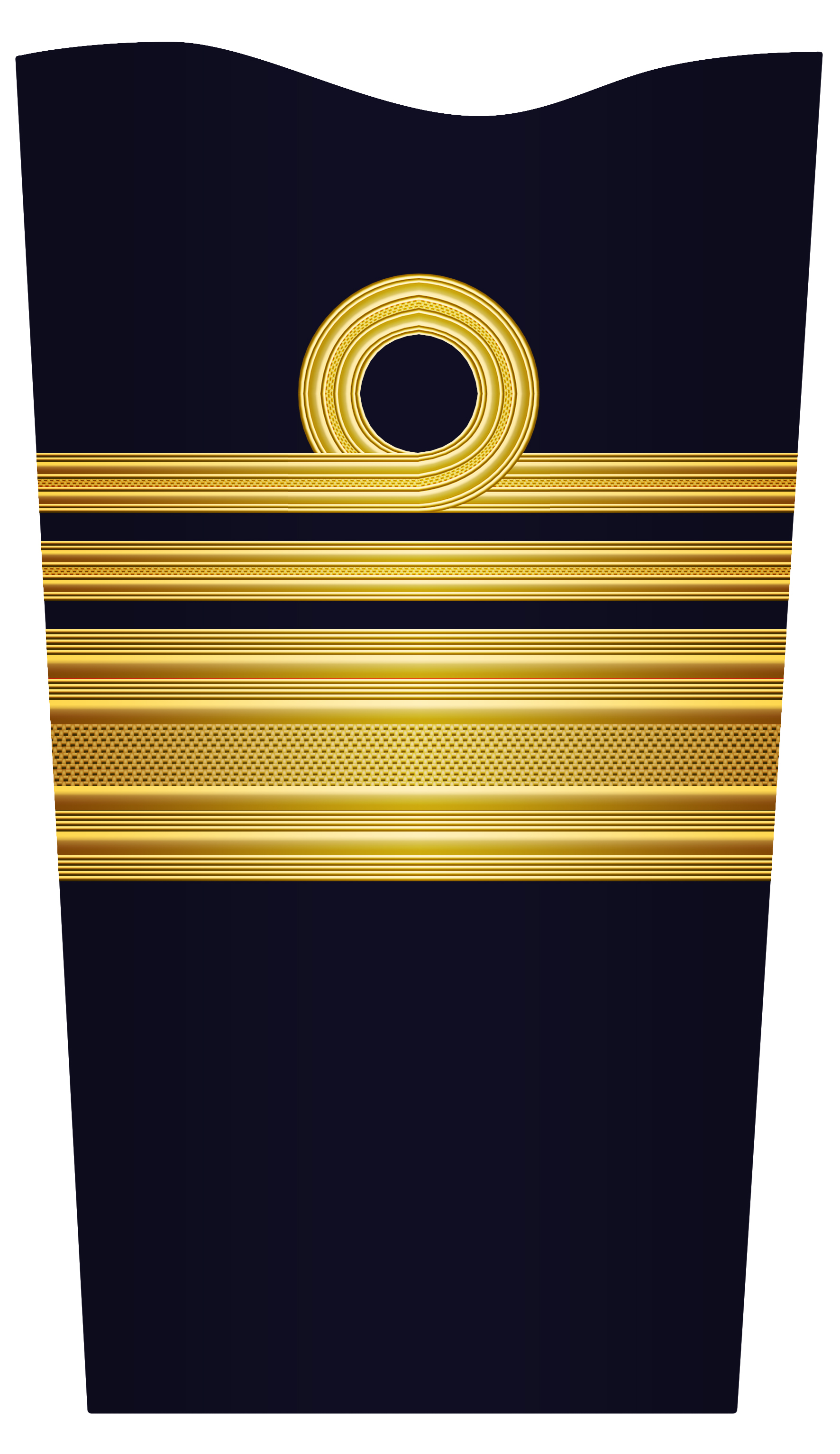
Sleeve insignia for a vice admiral (2003–present)

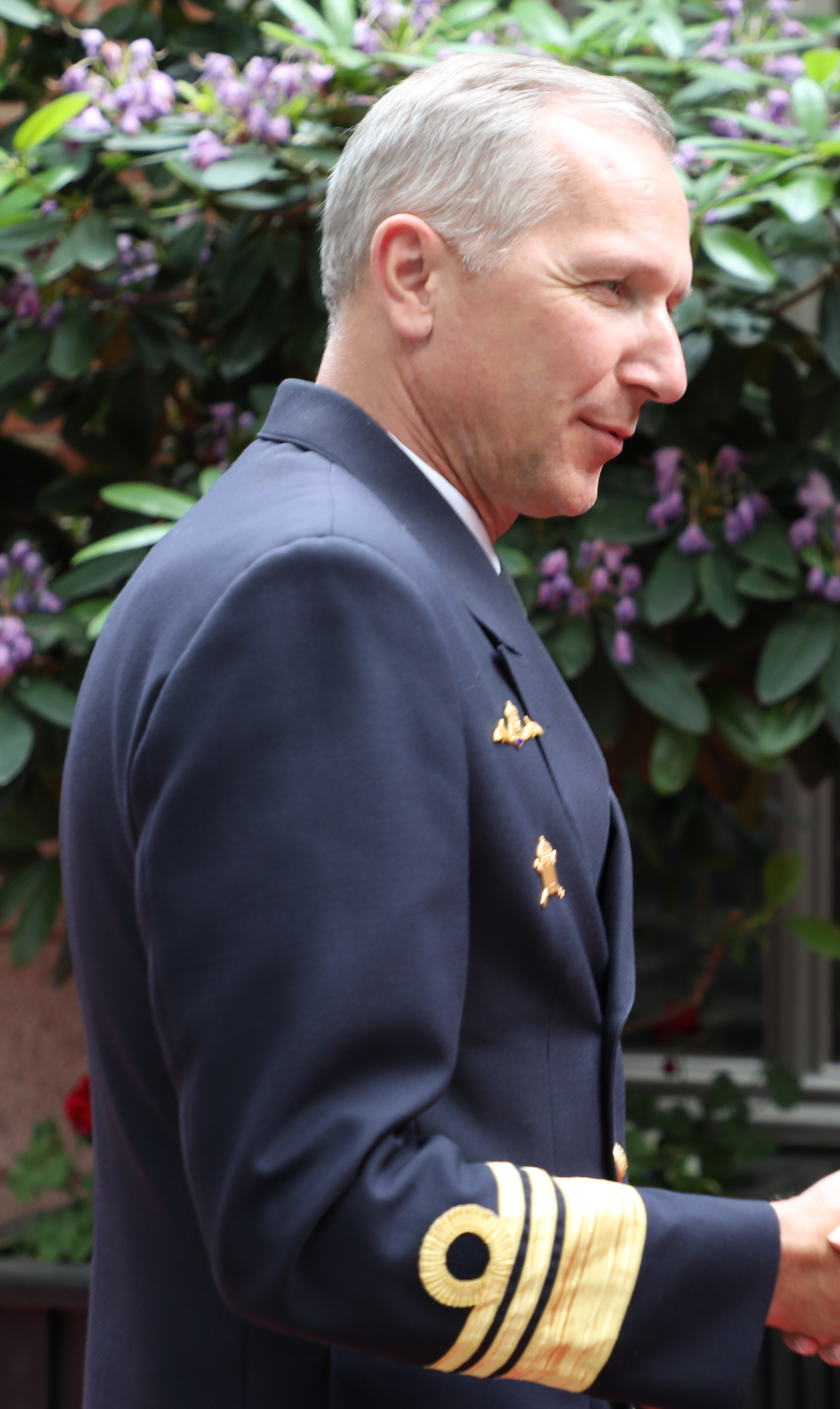
Vice Admiral Jonas Haggren with current sleeve insignia for a vice admiral (2003–present)

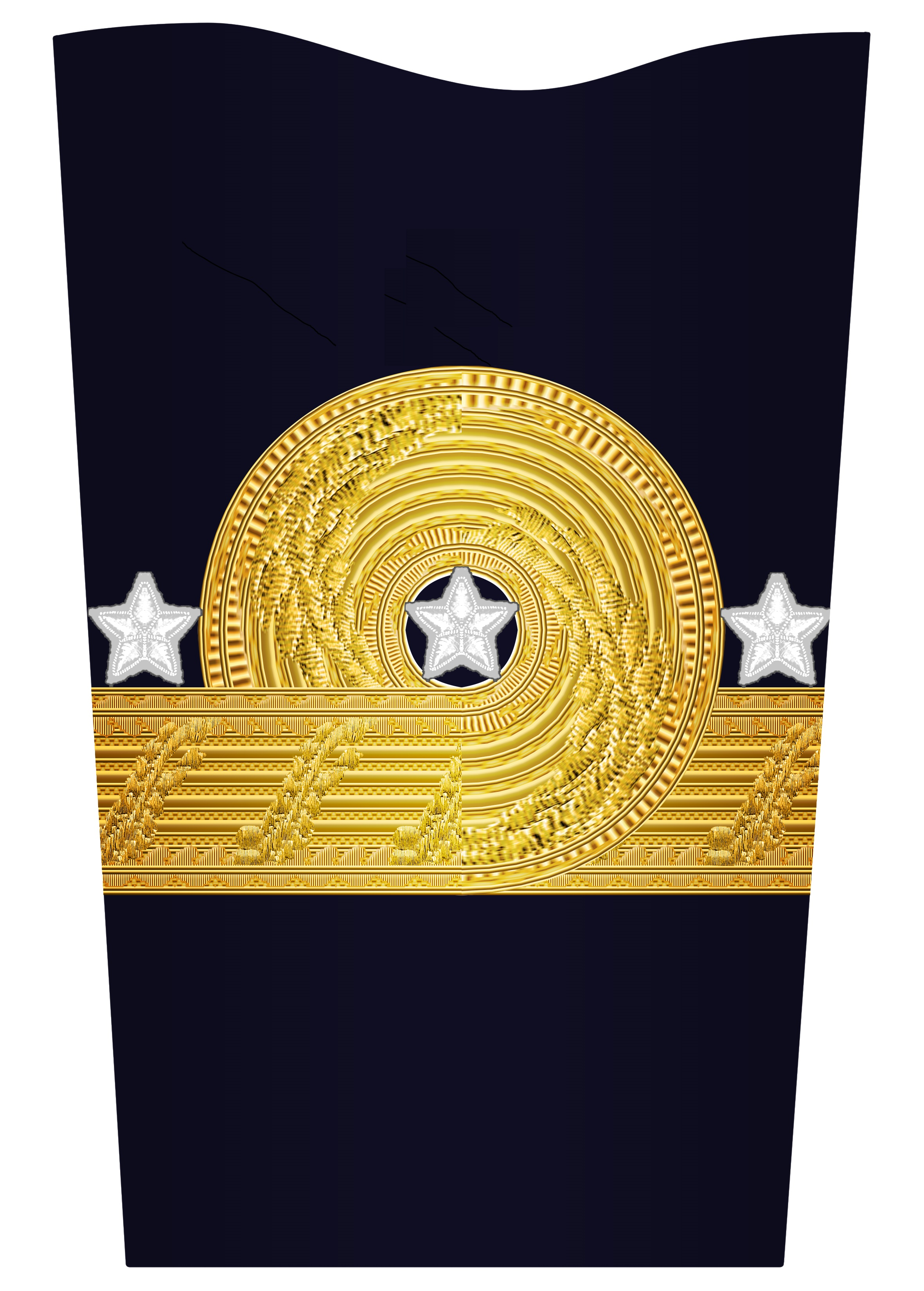
Sleeve insignia for a vice admiral (1972–2003)

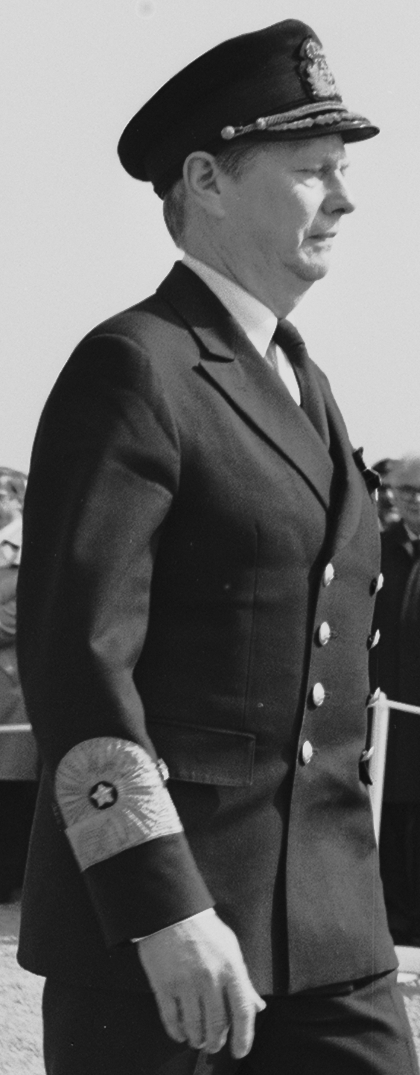
Vice Admiral Bengt Schuback with old sleeve insignia for a vice admiral (1972–2003)

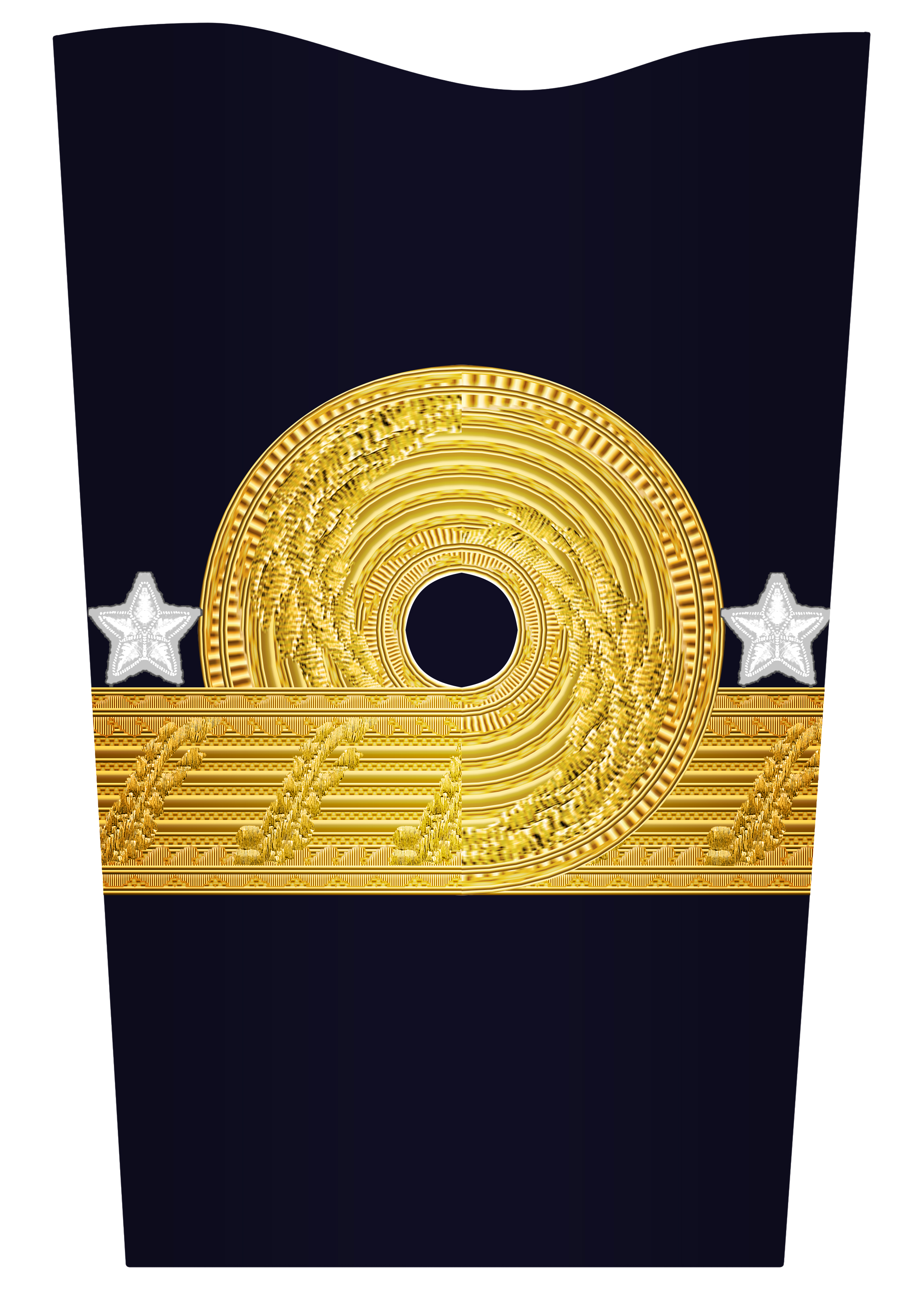
Sleeve insignia for a vice admiral (1878–1972)

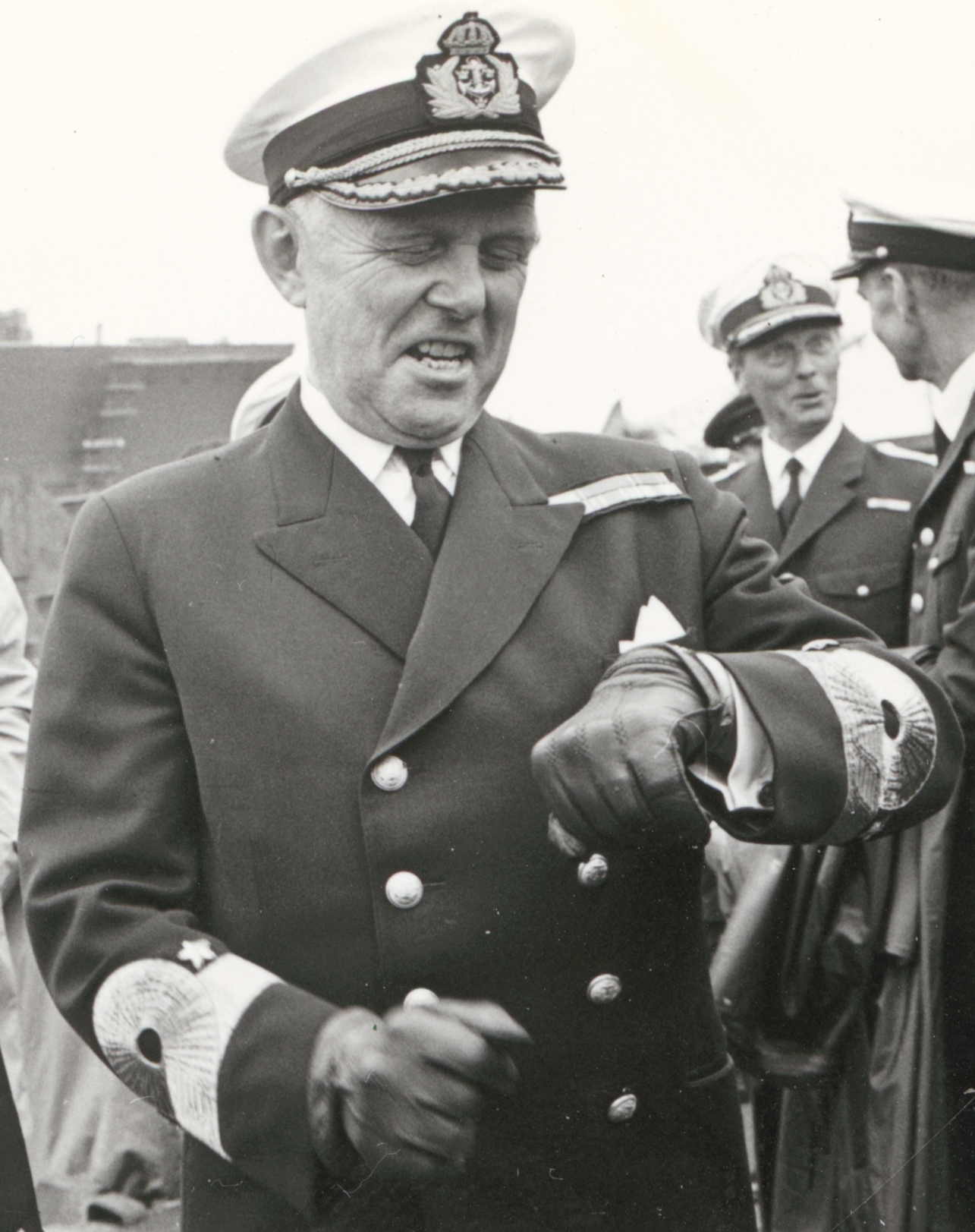
Vice Admiral Åke Lindemalm with old sleeve insignia for a vice admiral (1878–1972)

=== Hats ===
==== Peaked cap ====
A flag officer wears as embellishments a gold embroidered oak leaf wreath (known as scrambled egg) on the visor of the peaked cap (skärmmössa m/48). It also fitted with a hat badge (mössmärke m/78 off för flottan) and with a strap in form of a golden braid.

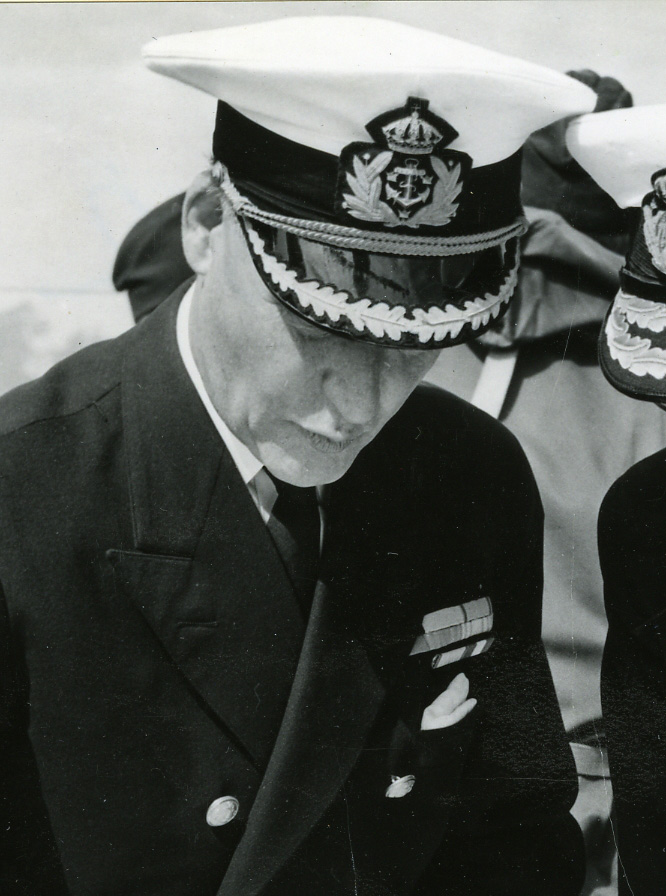
Peaked cap worn by Vice Admiral Stig H:son Ericson.

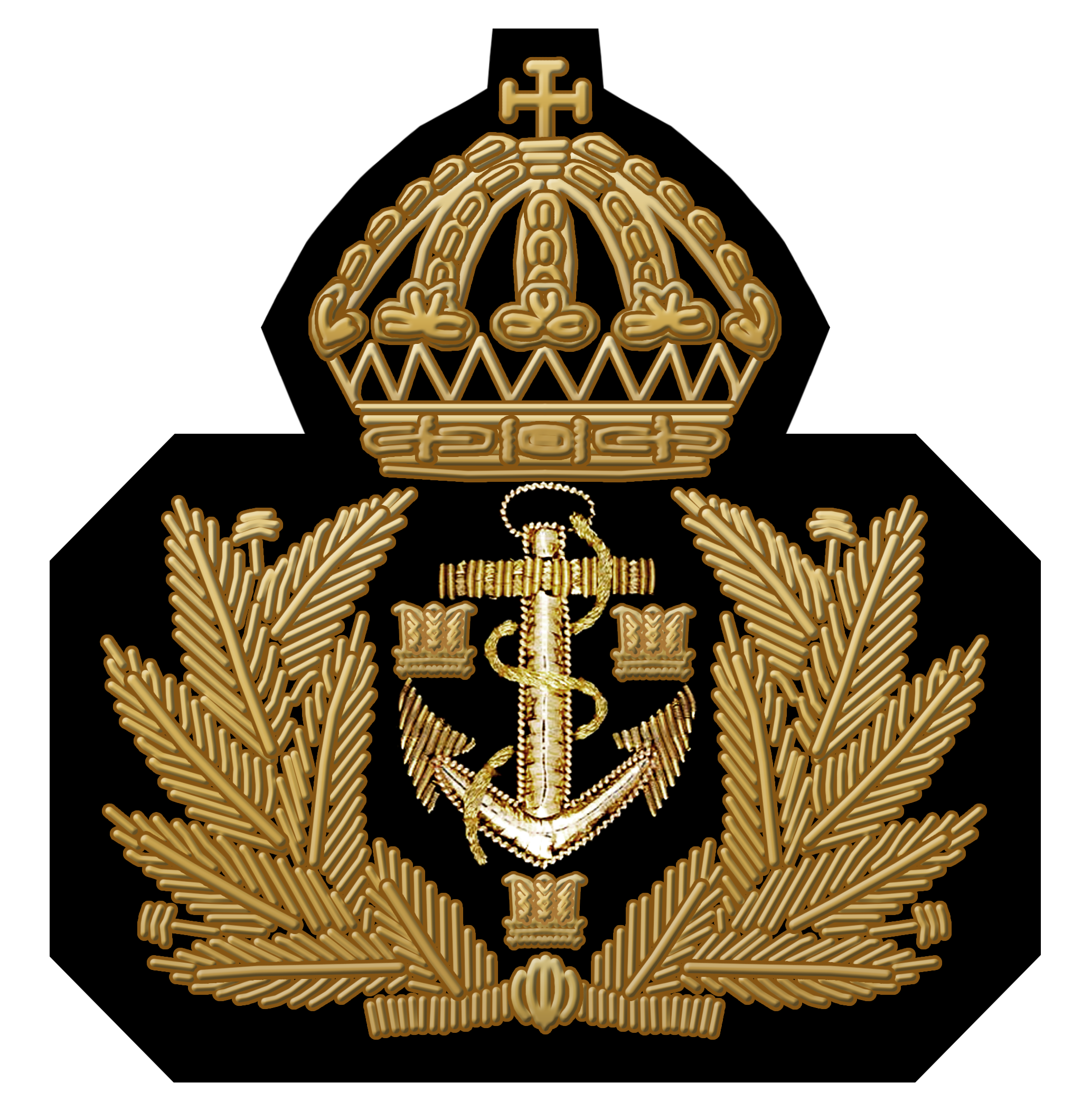
Hat badge

==== Side cap and winter hat ====
An officer wears a hat badge (mössmärke m/78 off) for the navy and another (mössmärke m/87 off) for amphibious units on the side cap (båtmössa m/48) and on the winter hat (vintermössa m/87).

== Personal flags ==
Admiral's command flag, which admirals of all ranks carry on ships, where they are as commanders. On a three-masted ship, a vice admiral's flag flies on the top of the fore-mast (admiral's flies on top of the main mast and rear admiral's on top of the mizzen-mast). The command flag of a vice admiral (and a lieutenant general) is a double swallowtailed Swedish flag. In the first blue field 3 five-pointed white stars placed one over two (before 1972 by two in the same place).

The flag of the vice admiral (and admiral and rear admiral) is flown on ships of the navy, from which officer of the rank now mentioned exercises his command, or on which he travels in the service, but not on ships on which he is in the capacity of exercise leader.

A flag officer (for example vice admiral) who holds the position of Supreme Commander, Chief of Operations, Chief of Navy, Chief of Maritime Component Command or naval force commander, may carry an admiral flag on a car in which the commander in question travels in uniform. On airplanes/helicopters, vice admirals (flag officers) may carry a command sign in the form of an image of an admiral flag.

Vice admiral flag (1972–present)

Vice admiral flag (1905–1972)

Vice admiral command flag (1875–1905)

Vice admiral command flag (1815–1844)

== Gun salute ==
When raising or lowering flags of the commander's, squadron, department or division commander, a gun salute is given with 15 rounds for vice admiral (17 for admiral and 13 for rear admiral).

== List of vice admirals ==
This along with the * (asterisk) indicates that the officer was subsequently promoted to admiral.
This along with the ^ (arrowhead) indicates that the officer is a currently serving vice admiral.

The following people have held the rank of vice admiral in the Swedish Navy from 1900–present:

Name	Year of promotion	Senior command(s) or appointment(s) in rank	Notes
Hjalmar af Klintberg*	1901	Chief of the Fleet Staff (1889–1903)	
Carl Hjulhammar	1911 (Note: Upon retirement.)		
Oscar Bernadotte	1903 (Note: Promoted to vice admiral on 27 November 1903; he was discharge on 11 December of the same year with permission to remain as vice admiral in the Swedish Navy reserve.)		
Wilhelm Dyrssen*	1901	Inspector of the Navy's Exercises at Sea (1907–16)	
Carl Olsen	1908	Chief of the Royal Swedish Naval Materiel Administration (1905–10), Highest Commander of the Coastal Fleet (1906–08)	
Ludvig Sidner	1911	Station commander in Karlskrona (1910–13), Chief of the Naval Staff (1913–16)	
Carl August Ehrensvärd*	1917	Inspector of the Navy's Exercises at Sea (1916–18), Highest Commander of the Coastal Fleet (1919)	
Gustaf Dyrssen	1917	Chief of the Royal Swedish Naval Materiel Administration (1910–20)	
Gustaf Lagercrantz	1919		
Henning von Krusenstierna*	1923	Chief of the Naval Staff (1916–27)	
Carl Alarik Wachtmeister	1925	Station commander in Stockholm (1923–25)	
Henry Lindberg	1925		
Fredrik Riben	1930	Station commander in Stockholm (1926–33)	
John Schneidler	1932	Chief of the Royal Swedish Naval Materiel Administration (1925–33)	
Otto Lybeck*	1932	Chief of the Naval Staff (1927–36)	
Charles de Champs	1934	East Coast Naval District (1933–36), Chief of the Naval Staff (1936–37), Chief of the Navy (1936–39)	
Harald Åkermark	1934	Chief of the Royal Swedish Naval Materiel Administration (1933–38), West Coast Naval District (1939–42)	
Fabian Tamm*	1939	Chief of the Navy (1939–45)	
Claës Lindsström	1942		
Hans Simonsson	1945		
Helge Strömbäck	1945	Chief of the Navy (1945–53)	
Gunnar Bjurner	1947		
Gösta Ehrensvärd	1950		
Stig H:son Ericson*	1953	Chief of the Navy (1953–61)	
Erik Anderberg	1957		
Erik Samuelson	1958		
Åke Lindemalm*	1961	Chief of the Navy (1961–70)	
Gunnar Jedeur-Palmgren	1962		
Erik af Klint	1966		
Bertil Berthelsson	1967		
Oscar Krokstedt	1968	Southern Military District (1968–72)	
Sigurd Lagerman	1968		
Bengt Lundvall*	1970	Chief of the Navy (1970–78)	
Holger Henning	1970		
Einar Blidberg	1971		
Karl Segrell	1971		
Bengt Schuback	1978	Chief of the Defence Staff (1978–82), Southern Military District (1982–84), Chief of the Navy (1984–90)	
Bror Stefenson*	1982	Chief of the Defence Staff (1982–87), Swedish National Defence College (1987–88), Eastern Military District (1988–91), Commandant General in Stockholm (1988–91)	
Dick Börjesson	1990	Chief of the Navy (1990–94), Middle Military District (1994–98), Commandant General in Stockholm (1994–98)	
Peter Nordbeck	1994	Chief of Navy Staff (1994–98), Naval Command (1994–98)	
Frank Rosenius	1998	Deputy Supreme Commander (1998–2000)	
Jan Thörnqvist	2016	Chief of Joint Operations (2016–2020), Commandant General in Stockholm (2019–20)	
Jonas Haggren^	2019	Chief of Defence Staff (2018–2022), Swedish Armed Forces Headquarters (2018–2022), Swedish Armed Forces Special Forces (2018–2022), Commandant General in Stockholm (2018–2019)	
Ewa Skoog Haslum^	2024	Chief of Joint Operations (2024–present)	
