= Gunnar Jedeur-Palmgren =

Swedish Navy officer

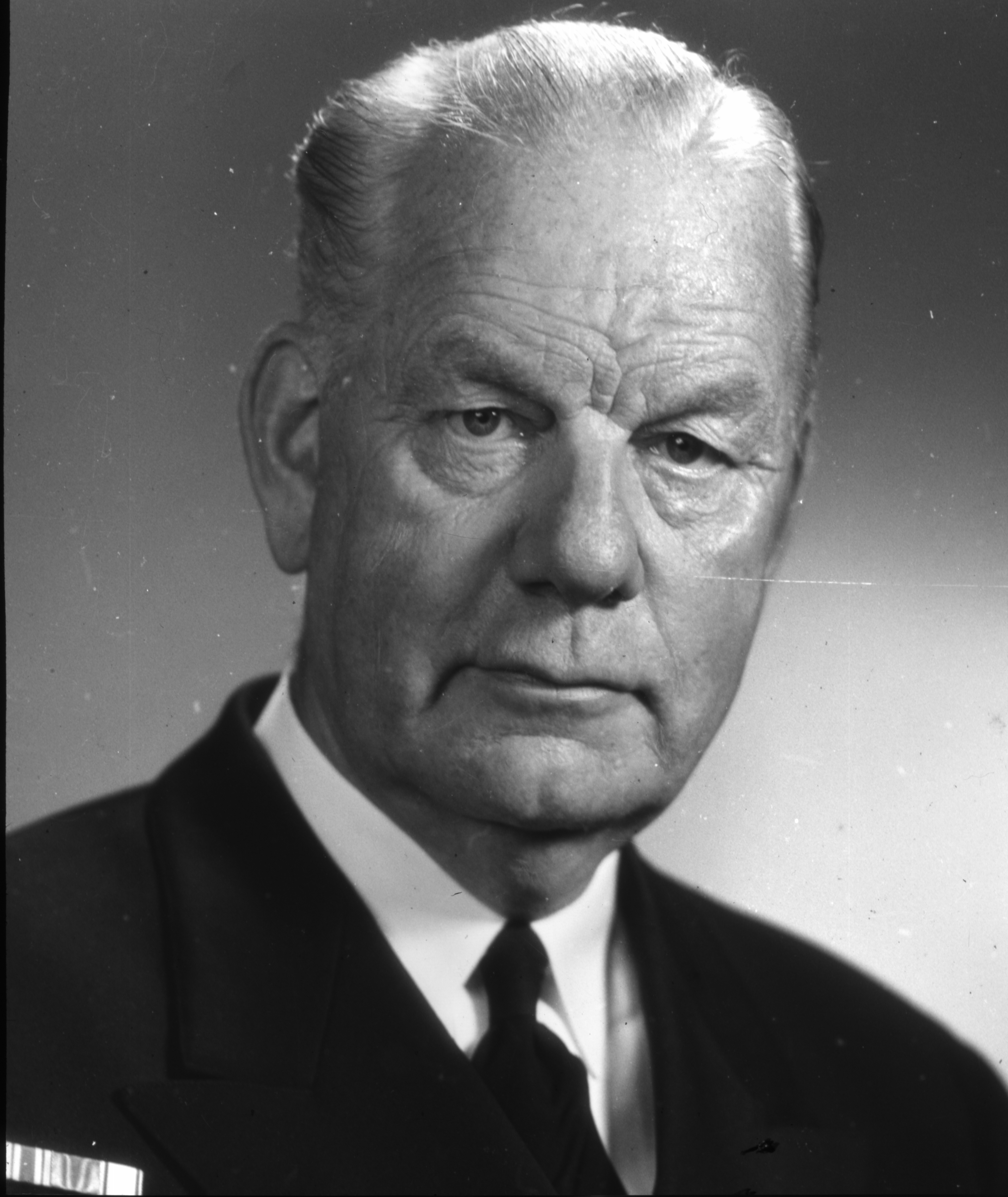
- Born: Axel Gunnar Jedeur-Palmgren; 4 November 1899; Gothenburg, Sweden
- Died: 6 March 1996 (aged 96); Onsala, Sweden
- Burial place: Östra kyrkogården, Gothenburg
- Military career
- Allegiance: Sweden
- Branch: Swedish Navy
- Service years: 1921–1962
- Rank: Vice Admiral
- Commands: Inspector of the Naval Artillery; Karlskrona Naval Yard; Royal Swedish Naval Materiel Administration

Vice Admiral Axel Gunnar Jedeur-Palmgren (4 November 1899 – 6 March 1996) was a Swedish Navy officer. Lagerman served as Vice Chief of the Royal Swedish Naval Materiel Administration (1950–1962).

== Early life ==
Jedeur-Palmgren was born on 4 November 1899 in Gothenburg, Sweden, the son of sea captain Gustaf Palmgren and his wife Agda (née Lilljequist). He passed studentexamen in Gothenburg in 1918.

== Career ==
Jedeur-Palmgren was commissioned as an officer in the Swedish Navy in 1921 with the rank of acting sub-lieutenant. He was a cadet officer at the Royal Swedish Naval Academy from 1927 to 1930 and was promoted to lieutenant in 1936. Jedeur-Palmgren then served as a teacher at the Royal Swedish Naval Staff College from 1937 to 1940 and from 1941 to 1944. He was promoted to commander in 1943 and was appointed Inspector of the Naval Artillery in 1944 and was promoted to captain in 1945 after being appointed head of the Weapons Department of the Royal Swedish Naval Materiel Administration the same year.

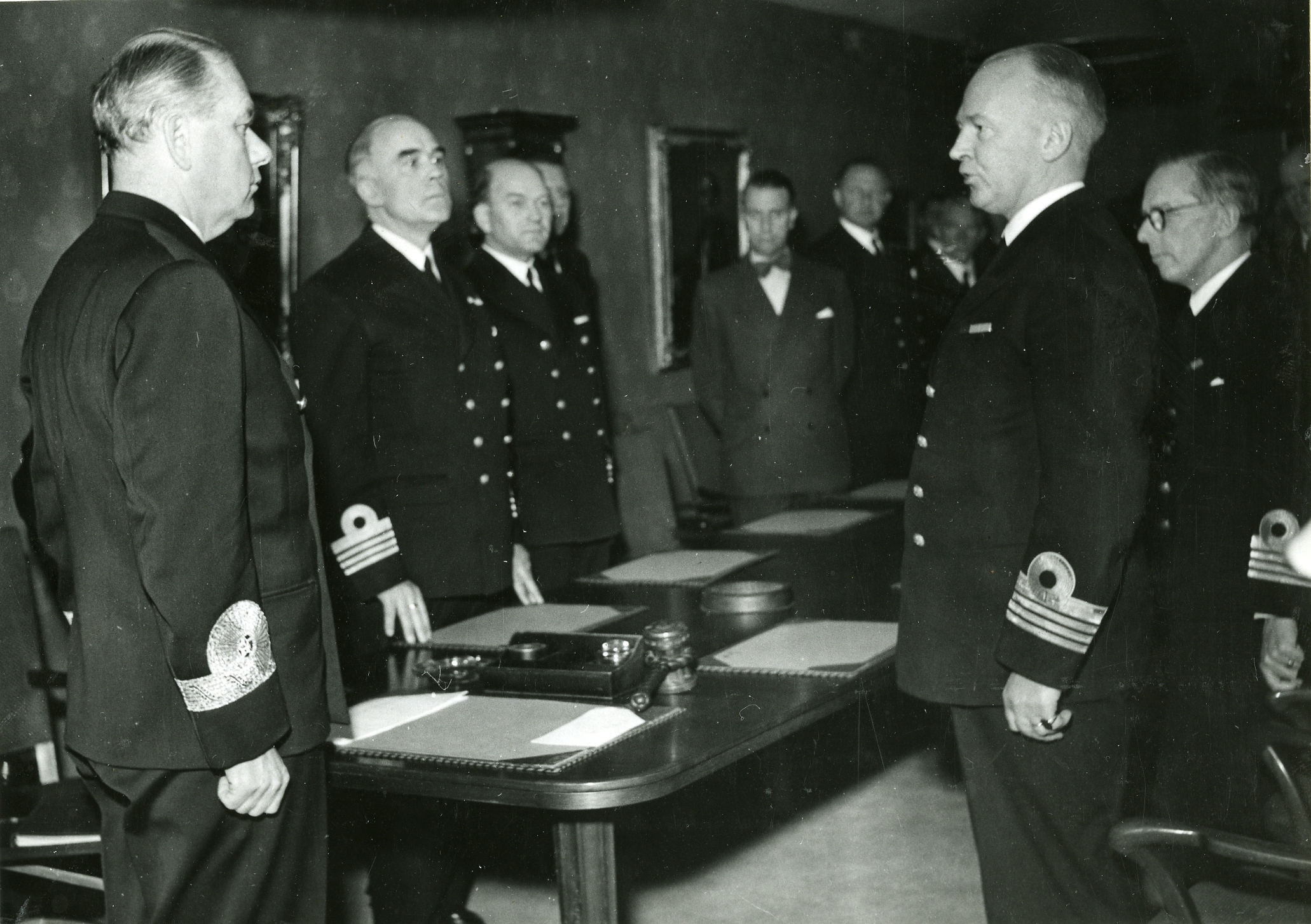
Rear Admiral Jedeur-Palmgren is welcomed as Vice Chief of the Royal Swedish Naval Materiel Administration on 1 April 1950.

Jedeur-Palmgren was appointed head of the Karlskrona Naval Yard (Karlskrona örlogsvarv) in Karlskrona in 1948 and in 1950 he was promoted to rear admiral and appointed Vice Chief of the Royal Swedish Naval Materiel Administration. In his capacity as Vice Chief of the Royal Swedish Naval Materiel Administration, Jedeur-Palmgren was a member of the Administration Board of the Swedish Armed Forces from 1954 to 1962. Under his leadership, the Naval Materiel Administration underwent a reorganization in connection with the 1946 military management investigation in order to achieve better adaptation to the technical development and the newbuilding plans in the 1950s. As chief, he contributed, among other things, to the introduction of a new navigation system. It was then that the Decca Navigator System in the Baltic Sea became a reality. During the 1950s, the salvage of the warship Vasa became relevant. Jedeur-Palmgren was strongly involved in the organization and financing of the salvage company, and through his care, donations were received for the first measures. He later joined the established Vasa Board (Vasanämnden) for coordination of matters concerning the salvage. Jedeur-Palmgren served as Vice Chief of the Naval Materiel Administration until 1962 when he retired from active service and was at the same time promoted to vice admiral.

In addition to his military commitments, Jedeur-Palmgren was an expert in the 1943 naval shipyard investigation, chairman of the Central Joint Consultation Board of the [Swedish] Armed Forces (Försvarets centrala företagsnämnd) from 1950 to 1960, of the Swedish Society for the Saving of Shipwrecked Persons from 1964 to 1973 and of the Stiftelsen Nationalfonden för sjökrigets offer ("National Fund Association for the Victims of the Naval War") from 1965 to 1974. Furthermore, he served as deputy chairman of the Swedish Board for Computing Machinery from 1950 to 1955 and the board of the Maritime Museum from 1951 to 1957. Jedeur-Palmgren was a member of the council of the National Swedish Defence Factories (Försvarets fabrikstyrelse) from 1945 to 1948, of Wasanämnden from 1959 to 1962, a member of the board of the Swedish National Defence Research Institute from 1950 to 1962, of the Swedish Shipping and Navy League (Föreningen Sveriges flotta) from 1951 to 1956 and of the Wasa Rediviva Foundation from 1963 to 1965.

== Personal life ==
In 1925, he married Kristina Lilljequist (1904–1991), the daughter of Thorsten Lilljequist and Therese Bundsen. They had two children: Lennart (1927–2016) and Orvar (born 1931).

== Death ==
Jedeur-Palmgren died on 6 March 1996 in Onsala, Sweden. He was interred on 29 April 1996 at Östra kyrkogården in Gothenburg.

== Dates of rank ==
- 1921 – Acting sub-lieutenant
- 1923 – Sub-lieutenant
- 1936 – Lieutenant
- 1941 – Lieutenant commander
- 1943 – Commander
- 1945 – Captain
- 1950 – Rear admiral
- 1962 – Vice admiral

== Awards and decorations ==
=== Swedish ===
- (Sweden) Commander Grand Cross of the Order of the Sword (6 June 1957)
- (Sweden) Knight of the Order of Vasa
- (Sweden) Swedish Auxiliary Naval Corps's Gold Medal
- (Sweden) Swedish Women's Voluntary Defence Organization's Gold Medal
- (Sweden) SthlmsfkGM

=== Foreign ===
- (France) Commander of the Legion of Honour
- (Netherlands) Grand Officer of the Order of Orange-Nassau

== Honours ==
- Member of the Royal Swedish Society of Naval Sciences (1939; honorary member in 1950)
- Member of the Royal Swedish Academy of War Sciences (1944)

== Bibliography ==
- Jedeur-Palmgren, Gunnar (1989). Onsala första galjot 1693-1710 (in Swedish). Kungsbacka: Nordhallands hembygdsfören. SELIBR 859691.

Military offices
Preceded by ?	Inspector of the Naval Artillery; 1944–1945	Succeeded by Moje Östberg
Preceded by Gösta Börje Odqvist	Karlskrona Naval Yard; 1948–1950	Succeeded by None
Preceded by Stig H:son Ericson	Vice Chief of the Royal Swedish Naval Materiel Administration; 1950–1962	Succeeded by Sigurd Lagerman
