= Royal Swedish Naval Materiel Administration =

Defunct government agency of Sweden

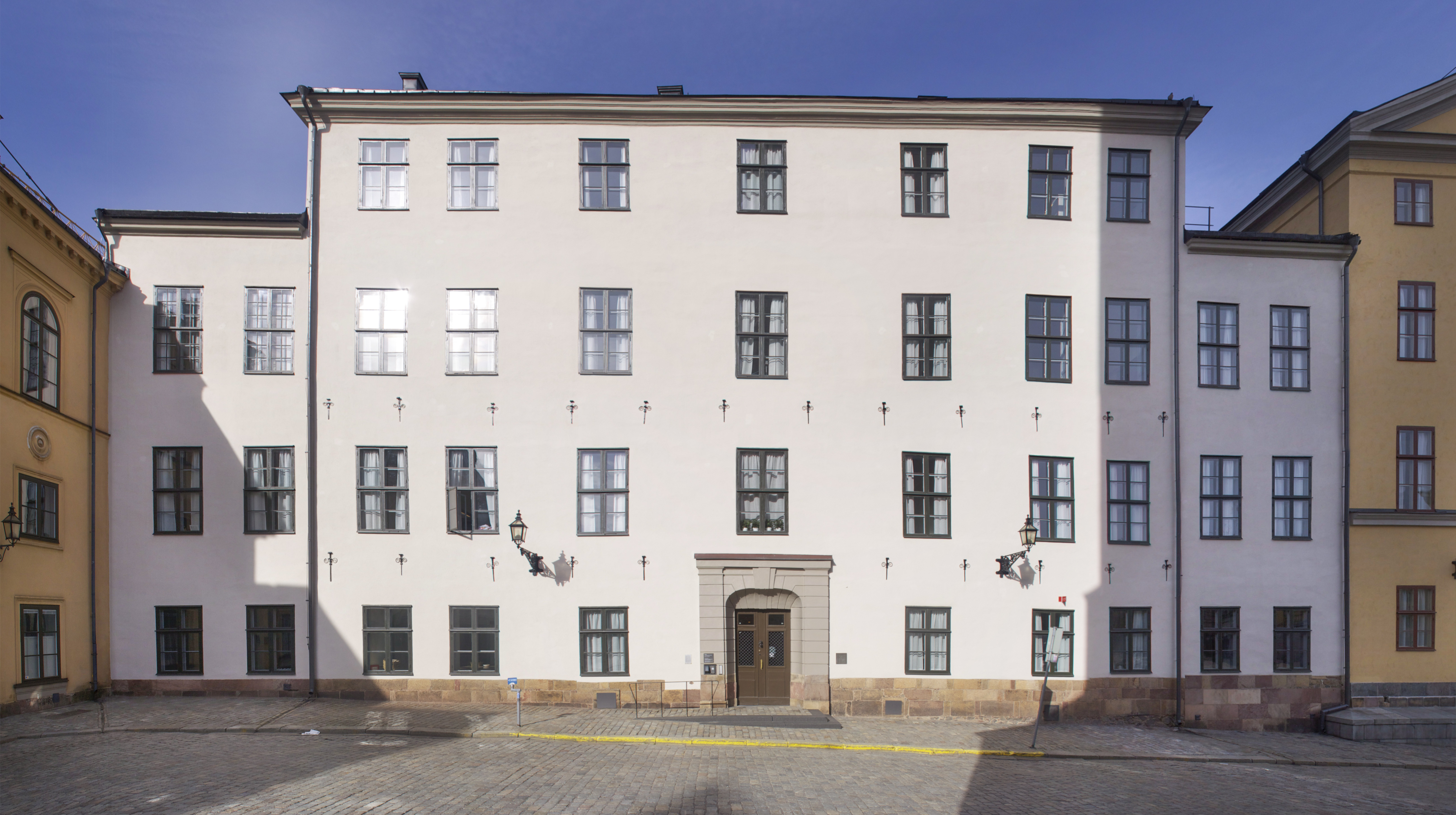
The Naval Materiel Administration was located in this building from 1878 to 1916.

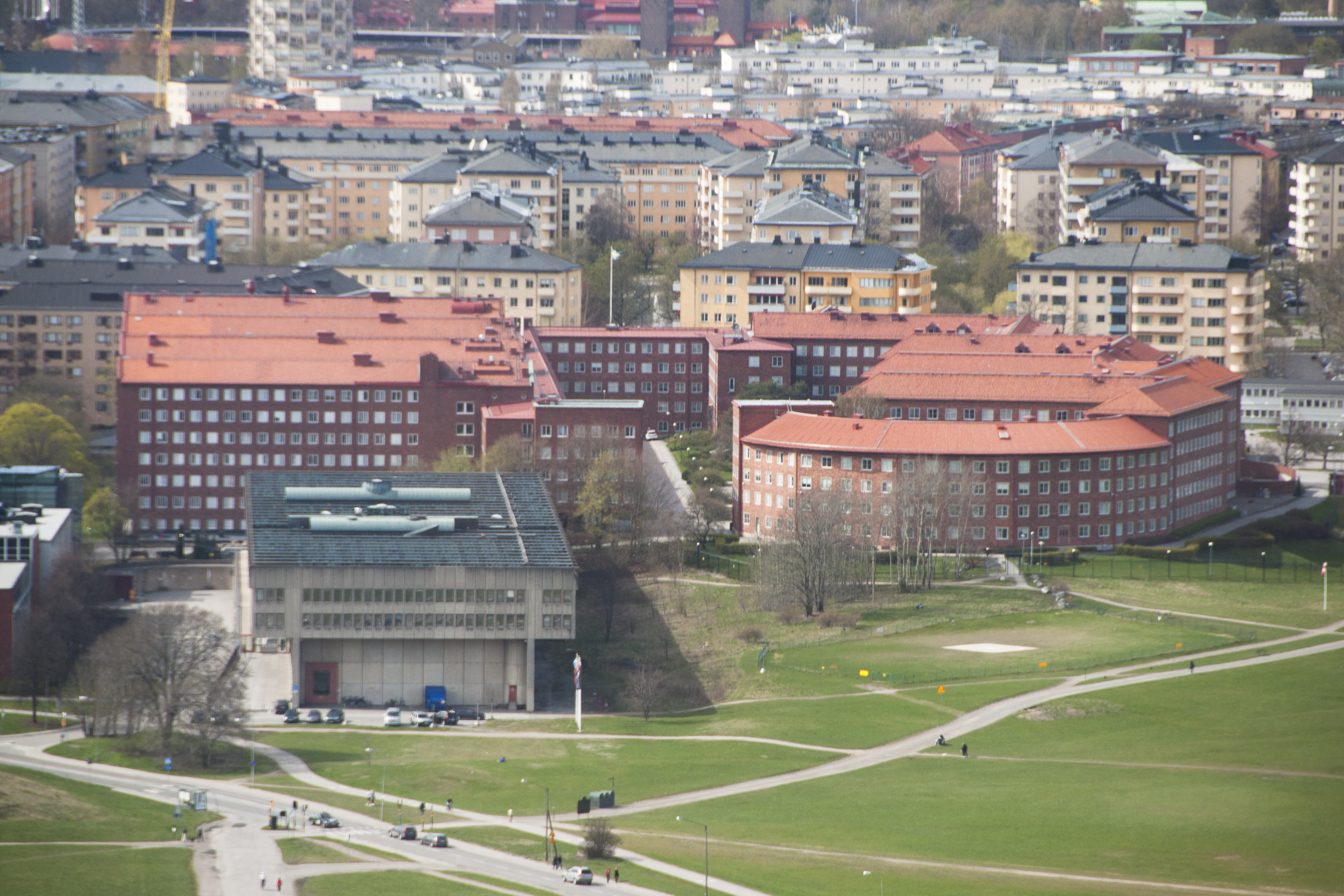
It was located in these red buildings at Banérgatan 62-64 in Stockholm from 1943 to 1968.

The Royal Swedish Naval Materiel Administration (Swedish: Kungliga Marinförvaltningen, KMF) was the central board of the Swedish Navy in technical and economic terms. It was active between the years 1878 and 1968 when it was disbanded and amalgamated into the Defence Materiel Administration.

== History ==
The Naval Materiel Administration was established on 1 January 1878 after the approval of the Riksdag and the royal decree, by the transformation of the Management of the Naval Affairs (Förvaltningen av sjöärendena) and the merger between Ministry for Naval Affairs' military and technical agencies. The Naval Materiel Administration consisted of three equal units: the Military Department, the Civil Department and the Engineering Department, each with its own chief but with common office and secretariat. The Naval Materiel Administration acted as the agency under the Ministry for Naval Affairs and was the head board for the defense fleet in military, technical and financial matters. The collegial rule lasted until 1881 when the chief of the entire administration was appointed. It was until 1920 a government agency under the Ministry for Naval Affairs, then the Ministry of Defence.

In 1968 the Naval Materiel Administration was disbanded and was amalgamated with the Royal Swedish Army Materiel Administration and Royal Swedish Air Force Materiel Administration into the Defence Materiel Administration.

== Location ==
The Naval Materiel Administration was located in Sparreska palatset at Riddarholmen in Stockholm from 1878 to 1916. After many years of renting offices in Stockholm it moved to new premises at Banérgatan 62-64 in Stockholm together with the Royal Swedish Army Materiel Administration and Royal Swedish Air Force Materiel Administration. It remained there until it disbanded in 1968.

== Chiefs ==
=== Chiefs ===
Chiefs from 1878 to 1943:

- 1878–1882: Rear Admiral August G. H. von Feilitzen (head of the military department and as such chairman in plenary)
- 1882–1883: Captain Berut Oscar Stackelberg (head of the military department and as such chairman in plenary)
- 1883–1887: Captain (Rear Admiral in 1886) Bernt Oscar Stackelbcrg
- 1887–1899: Captain (Vice Admiral in 1897) Edvard Svante Knut Peyron
- 1899–1901: Captain (Rear Admiral in 1900) Louis Palander
- 1901–1905: Rear Admiral Carl Magnus Ingelman
- 1905–1910: Rear Admiral (Vice Admiral in 1908) Carl Ollo Olsen
- 1910–1920: Captain (Vice Admiral in 1917) Gustaf Dyrssen
- 1919–1920: Captain Henry Lindberg (acting)
- 1920–1925: Captain (Vice Admiral in 1925) Henry Lindberg
- 1925–1933: Rear Admiral (Vice Admiral in 1932), John Schneidler
- 1933–1938: Rear Admiral (Vice Admiral in 1934), Harald Åkermark
- 1938–1943: Rear Admiral Gunnar Bjurner

=== Vice Chiefs* ===
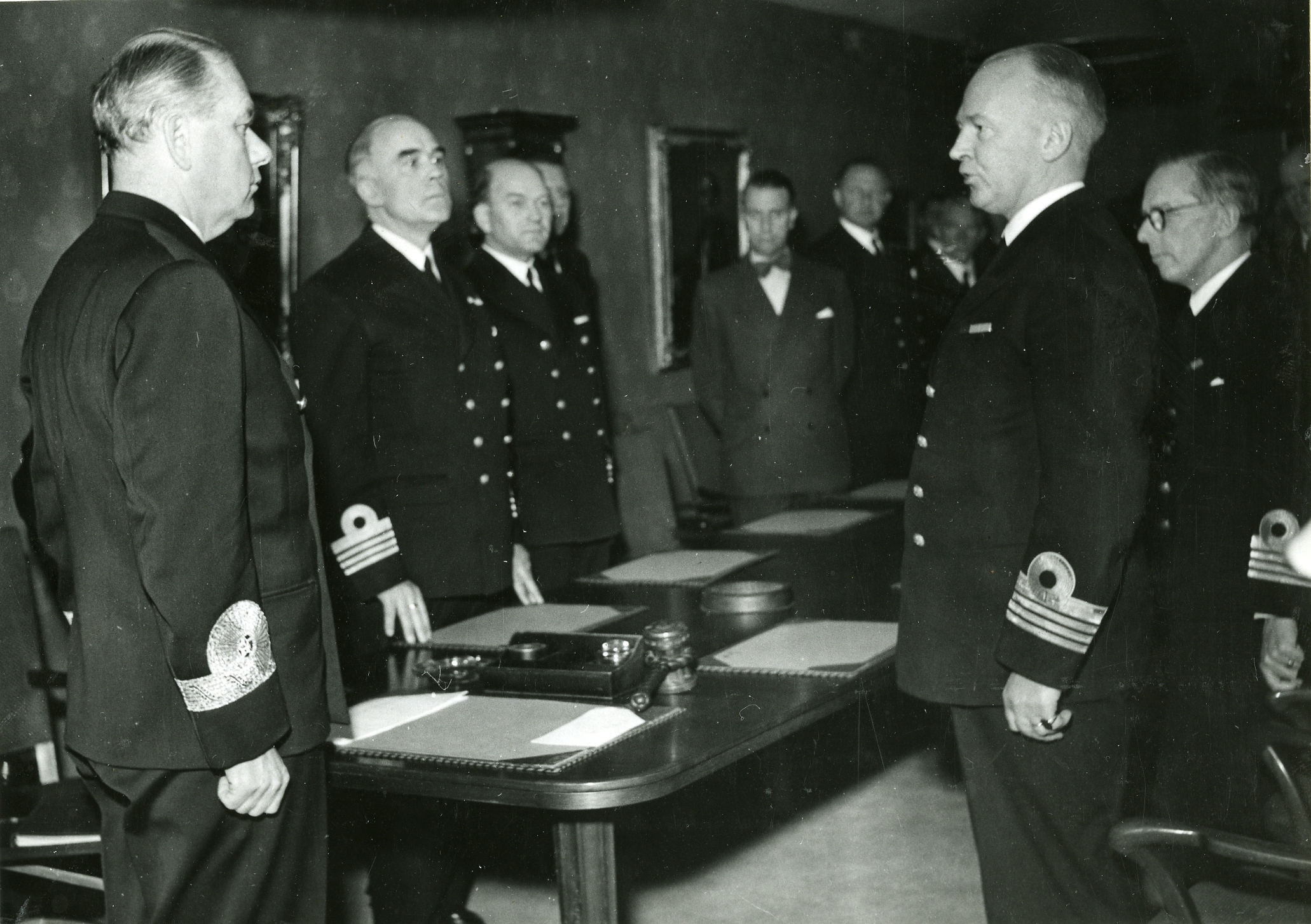
Rear Admiral Gunnar Jedeur-Palmgren is welcomed as Vice Chief of the Royal Swedish Naval Materiel Administration on 1 April 1950.

- 1944–1945: Rear Admiral Sten Erik P:son Wetter
- 1945–1950: Rear Admiral Stig H:son Ericson
- 1950–1962: Rear Admiral Gunnar Jedeur-Palmgren
- 1962–1963: Rear Admiral Sigurd Lagerman

=== Chiefs ===
- 1963–1968: Rear Admiral Sigurd Lagerman

*During the period 1943–1963 the Chief of the Navy was also the Chief of the Royal Swedish Naval Materiel Administration.

== See also ==
- Royal Swedish Army Materiel Administration
- Royal Swedish Air Force Materiel Administration
