= Sigurd (name) =

Sigurd or Sigur (Pronounced the same) is a Scandinavian male name used in Norway, Denmark, Sweden, and Iceland derived from the Old Norse: Sigurðr (from sigr "victory" and varðr "guardian"). Other forms of this name are Sigvard and Siward. A short form of the name is Sjur.

Sigurd may refer to:

Several figures from Norse mythology and legend:

- Sigurd, a hero from the Völsunga Saga
- Sigurd Hring, the legendary Danish king and father of Ragnar Lodbrok
- Sigurd Snake-in-the-Eye, the Viking warlord and son of Ragnar Lodbrok

Several Norwegian monarchs:

- Sigurd Hart, a king of Ringarike and contemporary of Halfdan the Black
- Sigurd Syr, petty king of Ringarike and father of Harald III of Norway
- King Sigurd I of Norway, also known as Sigurd Jorsalfar (the Crusader).
- King Sigurd II of Norway

Several Jarls of Orkney:

- Sigurd Eysteinsson, Jarl in the late 9th century
- Sigurd Hlodvirsson, Jarl of Orkney (circa 991-1014), killed at the Battle of Clontarf

A number of pretenders to the Norwegian throne:

- Sigurd Slembe
- Sigurd Markusfostre
- Sigurd Magnusson

Other figures from Scandinavian history:

- Sigurd Haakonsson (circa 895-962), Earl of Lade
- Saint Sigurd of Växjö, also known as Sigfrid
- Siward, Earl of Northumbria, whose Danish name was Sigurd
- Sigurd Jonsson of Sudreim, Regent of Norway on two occasions in the 15th century. Offered the throne in 1448, but declined.
- Sigurd Ibsen, the eight prime minister of Norway in Stockholm, and son of playwright Henrik Ibsen.

In music:

- Sigurd, one of the two guitarists and founding members of the blackened death metal band Belphegor
- Sigurd Køhn, Norwegian jazz musician
- Sigurd Wongraven, better known as Satyr, lead singer and guitarist of Norwegian black metal band Satyricon

In architecture and arts:

- Sigurd Frosterus, Finnish architect and art critic
- Sigurd Wettenhovi-Aspa, Finnish painter, sculptor and writer

In science:

- Sigurd Angenent, Dutch mathematician

In military:

- Sigurd Kihlstedt, Swedish military surgeon
- Sigurd Lagerman, Swedish Navy vice admiral

In politics:

- Sigurd Agersnap (born 1993), Danish politician

== Fictionals Sigurds ==
- Sigurd, character in the 1996 video game Fire Emblem: Genealogy of the Holy War.
- Sigurd Snake-in-the-Eye, character in the 2013 television series Vikings, based on the historical Sigurd Snake-in-the-Eye.
- Sigurd Styrbjornsson, character in the 2020 video game Assassin's Creed: Valhalla.
- Sigurd, writer of logs in the 2023 video game Lethal Company.

== See also ==
- Siward (disambiguation), English equivalent to Sigurd
