= Moje Östberg =

Swedish Navy officer

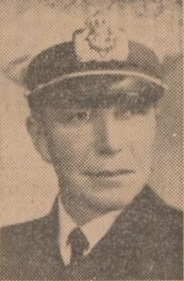
- Born: Knut Mauritz Östberg; 9 September 1897; Stockholm, Sweden
- Died: 13 November 1984 (aged 87); Lund, Sweden
- Burial place: Galärvarvskyrkogården
- Military career
- Allegiance: Sweden
- Branch: Swedish Navy
- Service years: 1919–1957
- Rank: Rear Admiral
- Commands: HSwMS Dristigheten; HSwMS Manligheten; HSwMS Gotland; Section 2, Defence Staff; Vice Chief of the Defence Staff; West Coast Naval District

Rear Admiral Knut Mauritz "Moje" Östberg (9 September 1897 – 13 November 1984) was a Swedish Navy officer. Östberg's senior commands include postings as captain of the coastal defence ships HSwMS Dristigheten and HSwMS Manligheten as well as captain of the seaplane cruiser HSwMS Gotland. He also served as commanding officer of the West Coast Naval District as well as naval attaché in Berlin, Washington, D.C. and Ottawa.

== Early life ==
Östberg was born on 9 September 1897 in Stockholm, Sweden, the son of Axel Östberg, a bank clerk, and his wife Hilda (née Eriksson). He enrolled as a cadet at the Royal Swedish Naval Academy in 1916.

== Career ==
After sea expeditions on the armored cruiser HSwMS Fylgia and on the coastal defence ships HSwMS Thor and HSwMS Dristigheten, Östberg was commissioned as an officer in the Swedish Navy in 1919 with the rank of acting sub-lieutenant. He devoted himself to the naval artillery, and served on the coastal defence ships HSwMS Sverige and HSwMS Gustaf V, the torpedo cruiser HSwMS Claes Horn and the destroyer HSwMS Vidar and became a sub-lieutenant (löjtnant) in 1922. He realized early on the necessity of modernizing the artillery fire control in order to take advantage of the tremendous development of firepower and range. In doing so, he utilized, among other things, the newly-established Eldledningsskolan ("Fire Control School"), which was built at Hårsfjärden. Here he served during the mid-1920s, alternating with the completion of the Royal Swedish Naval Staff College's general course and staff course. Östberg's modern and practical experience of the artillery was utilized in the construction of the destroyers HSwMS Ehrensköld and HSwMS Nordenskjöld in the late 1920s, which characterized a new type. He also gained insight into how, in the growing German Navy, utilized the experiences of World War I through his posting on a German destroyer in 1931.

Since Östberg took up the position of artillery adjutant in the Highest Commander of the Coastal Fleet's staff in 1929, he was able to work effectively for his ideas about the naval artillery and combat service through realistic exercises. He remained in this position until 1934, when he was promoted to lieutenant. In the construction of the seaplane cruiser HSwMS Gotland, his artillery knowledge was utilized, both during construction and his service as an artillery officer on board 1934-1936. Östberg's quick perception and determination made him fit and efficient as a staff officer. He served in the South Coast Naval District Staff in Karlskrona from 1936 to 1938, then as captain of the coastal defence ship HSwMS Dristigheten in 1938, and then as a staff officer in the Military Office of the Naval Defence (Sjöförsvarets kommandoexpedition) from 1938 to 1942. During this time he was also a teacher in the art of naval warfare at the Royal Swedish Army Staff College. Östberg was promoted to lieutenant commander in 1941 and served as captain of the coastal defence ship HSwMS Manligheten from 1941 to 1942.

During the years 1942–1944, he was posted as a naval attaché in Berlin and experienced the devastating bombings that the Allies deployed. Östberg was promoted to commander in 1943 and served as captain of the seaplane cruiser HSwMS Gotland from 1944 to 1945 when he was promoted to captain. In 1945, Östberg was appointed Inspector of the Naval Artillery. Östberg's previous posting in Berlin led him to become head of the Defence Staff's Section II in 1950. Also in 1950, he was appointed Vice Chief of the Defence Staff. During his time in the Defence Staff, he was also head of the school department of the mine cruiser HSwMS Älvsnabben and of the coastal defence ship HSwMS Drottning Victoria. He was then posted to Washington, D.C. and Ottawa as naval attaché from 1951 to 1954, where he could follow the arms race and contradictions between the great powers that followed the Korean War, which caused him serious concerns for Sweden. Östberg's final posting was as commanding officer of the West Coast Naval District from 1954 to 1957. He was promoted to rear admiral in 1955.

== Later life ==
Östberg never ceased during his long time as an old age pensioner to follow daily events in and around the Swedish Navy. He was badly affected by the abolition of heavy and medium-heavy artillery and the decommissioning of the coastal defence ships, cruisers and destroyers. He was severely tormented by the constant decline in the Swedish Navy's resources. The idea that one could not even prevent the entry and behavior of foreign submarines in the navy bases in Hårsfjärden and in Karlskrona tormented and made him depressed.

== Personal life ==
Östberg had two children from his first marriage, Kerstin (born 1923) and Marianne (born 1927). In 1933, Östberg married Marguerite Victoria Timen (born 1899), the daughter of Axel Timen and Olga Nelson. They had one daughter, Margareta (born 1936).

== Death ==
Östberg died on 13 November 1984 in Lund and was buried on 8 October 1985 at Galärvarvskyrkogården in Stockholm.

== Dates of rank ==
- 1919 – Acting sub-lieutenant
- 1922 – Sub-lieutenant
- 1934 – Lieutenant
- 1941 – Lieutenant commander
- 1943 – Commander
- 1945 – Captain
- 1955 – Rear admiral

== Awards and decorations ==
=== Swedish ===
- (Sweden) Commander 1st Class of the Order of the Sword (11 November 1952)
- (Sweden) Knight of the Order of the Polar Star
- (Sweden) Vasa Medal in gold

=== Foreign ===
- (United States) Commander of the Legion of Merit (12 January 1955)
- (Netherlands) Commander of the Order of Orange-Nassau with swords
- (Spain) Knight First Class of the Crosses of Military Merit with White Decoration
- (Nazi Germany) 2nd Class of the Order of the German Eagle
- (Finland) 4th Class of the Order of the Cross of Liberty with swords
- (Poland) Knight of the Order of Polonia Restituta
- (Norway) King Haakon VII Freedom Cross

== Honours ==
- Honorary member of the Royal Swedish Society of Naval Sciences (1937)
- Member of the Royal Swedish Academy of War Sciences (1947)

== Bibliography ==
- Sahlin, Torsten; Östberg, Moje, eds. (1936). Flottan förr och nu: minnesbok för dem som tjänstgjort vid flottan (in Swedish). Karlskrona: Göteborg. SELIBR 1363972.

== Filmography ==
- Med flottan till sjöss (1927) - director

Military offices
Preceded by Gunnar Jedeur-Palmgren	Inspector of the Naval Artillery; 1945–1949	Succeeded by Sigurd Lagerman
Preceded by Thord Bonde	Vice Chief of the Defence Staff; 1950–1951	Succeeded by Sam Myhrman
Preceded by ?	Section 2 of the Defence Staff; 1950–1951	Succeeded by Erik af Klint
Preceded by Eskil Gester	West Coast Naval District; 1954–1957	Succeeded by Gunnar Fogelberg
