= Sigurd Lagerman =

Swedish Navy officer

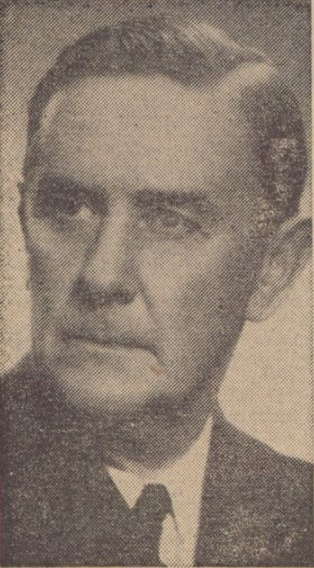
- Lagerman as rear admiral.
- Born: Albert Hugo Sigurd Lagerman; 11 January 1904; Stockholm, Sweden
- Died: 9 March 1970 (aged 66); Täby, Sweden
- Burial place: Galärvarvskyrkogården
- Military career
- Allegiance: Sweden
- Branch: Swedish Navy
- Service years: 1925–1968
- Rank: Vice Admiral
- Commands: 1st Squadron, Coastal Fleet; Inspector of the Naval Artillery; Naval Command South; Royal Swedish Naval Materiel Administration

Vice Admiral Albert Hugo Sigurd Lagerman (11 January 1904 – 9 March 1970) was a Swedish Navy officer. Lagerman served as Commanding Admiral of Naval Command South (1958–1961) and was Chief of the Royal Swedish Naval Materiel Administration (1963–1968).

== Early life ==
Lagerman was born on 11 January 1904 in Stockholm, Sweden, the son of Albert Lagerman and his wife Thérese Olsson. He passed studentexamen in 1922 and entered the Royal Swedish Naval Academy the same year, from which he graduated in 1925 and was commissioned as an officer.

== Career ==
=== Military career ===
Lagerman's mathematical talent and technical disposition gave a natural focus to the artillery service. He spent most of his early military career in artillery positions on coastal defence ships. Lagerman attended the artillery course at the Royal Swedish Naval Staff College from 1933 to 1935 and served from 1935 to 1938 in the Artillery Department at Karlskrona Naval Yard, and in 1938 he became artillery officer on HSwMS Drottning Victoria. Lagerman was promoted to lieutenant in 1937 and served as a teacher at the Royal Swedish Naval Staff College in 1940 and at the Royal Swedish Naval Academy from 1941 to 1944. Lagerman was promoted to lieutenant commander in 1943 and was appointed head of the Artillery Department at Karlskrona Naval Yard (Karlskrona örlogsvarv) in 1944 and he was promoted to commander in 1945.

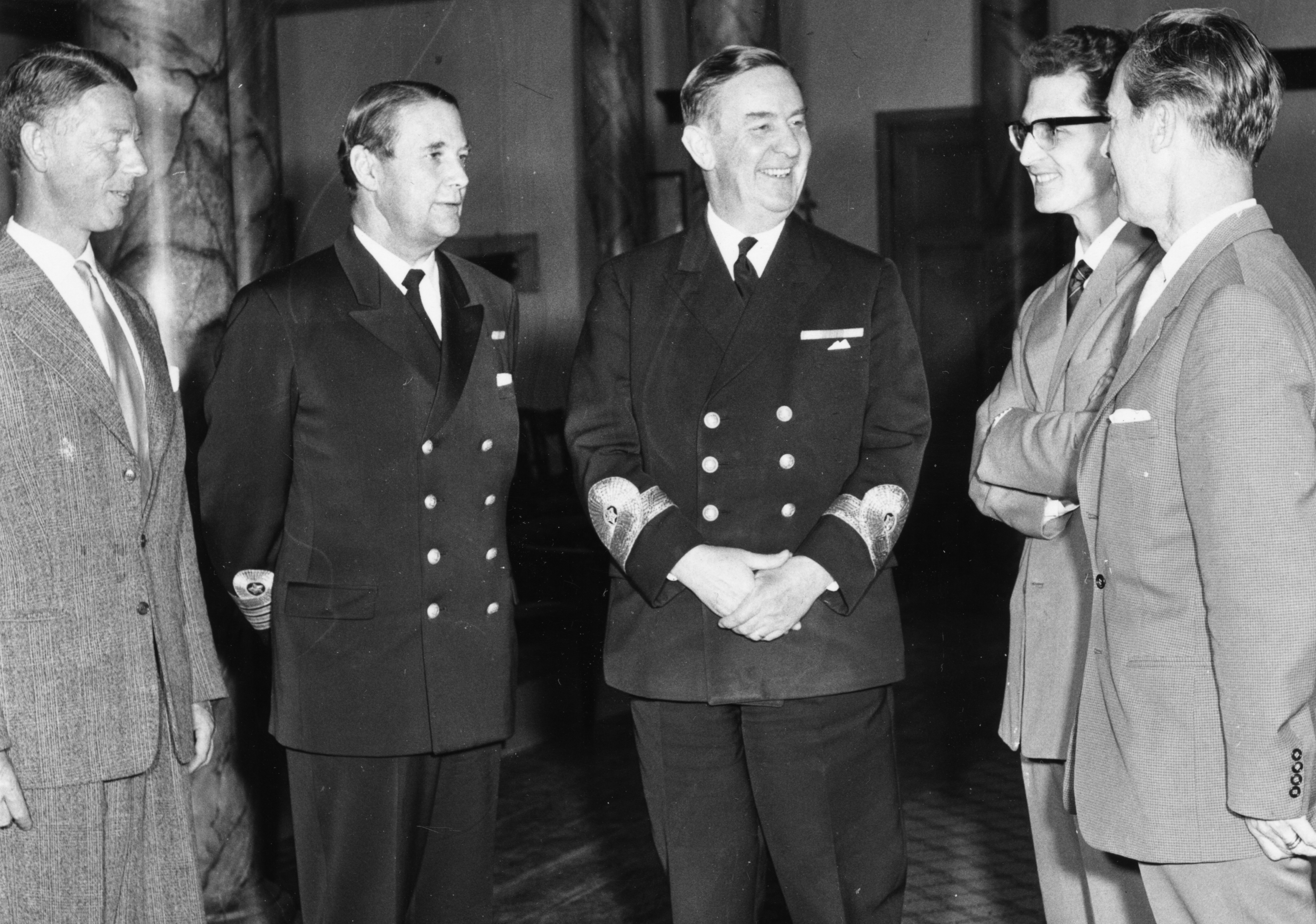
Rear Admiral Lagerman (middle) in the late 1950s or early 1960s.

In 1945, Lagerman was appointed head of the Artillery Division in the Royal Swedish Naval Materiel Administration. In this position, he took an active part in many development projects, of which the most notable is the testing of the naval version of the Bofors 40 mm gun. He was promoted to captain in 1950 and then served as commander of the Stockholm Department (Stockholmsavdelningen) from 1950 to 1951 and as Inspector of the Naval Artillery (Inspektör för sjöartilleriet) from 1950 to 1955 as well as commander of the 1st Squadron of the Coastal Fleet from 1953 to 1954. Lagerman attended the Swedish National Defence College from 1952 to 1953 and in 1955 he was appointed head of the Weapons Department of the Royal Swedish Naval Materiel Administration. In 1958, Lagerman was promoted to rear admiral and assumed the position of Commanding Admiral, Naval Command South. He then served as Vice Chief of the Royal Swedish Naval Materiel Administration from 1962 to 1963 and then as its Chief from 1963 to 1968 when he retired and was promoted to vice admiral. His long-term service in the Naval Materiel Administration was characterized by a constant effort to adapt management operations to the requirements of the time. During his time, computer systems and storage offices were established. In his capacity as Vice Chief and Chief of the Royal Swedish Naval Materiel Administration, Lagerman was a member of the Administration Board of the Swedish Armed Forces from 1962 to 1968.

=== Other work ===
In addition to his military commitments, Lagerman was an expert in the National Computing Machinery Investigation (Statens matematikmaskinutredning) and in the Swedish Board for Computing Machinery from 1947 to 1955, and he was a member of the Swedish Board for Computing Machinery from 1955 to 1963, which actively helped to introduce computers in Sweden. Under his auspices, a Nordic symposium for computing machinery was organized in 1959 in Karlskrona. Lager was also chairman of the Central Joint Consultation Board of the [Swedish] Armed Forces (Försvarets centrala företagsnämnd) from 1962. He became a member of the Royal Swedish Society of Naval Sciences in 1942 and was its librarian from 1944 to 1945 and its chairman from 1958 to 1961. Lagerman became an honorary member in 1958. In addition, he was a member of the Royal Swedish Academy of War Sciences from 1951.

== Personal life ==
In 1928, Lagerman married Ana Wilhelmson (born 1907), the daughter of Professor Carl Wilhelmson and his wife Berta (née Kerfstedt). They had one child; Thomas (born 1929).

In 1955, he married Inga Wide (born 1910), the daughter of dentist Hjalmar Bretz and Hedvig Andersson.

== Death ==
Lagerman died on 9 March 1970 in Täby. The funeral service was held on 15 May 1970 at Skeppsholmen Church in Stockholm. He was interred at Galärvarvskyrkogården in Stockholm on 30 May 1970.

== Dates of rank ==
- 19?? – Acting sub-lieutenant
- 19?? – Sub-lieutenant
- 1937 – Lieutenant
- 1943 – Lieutenant commander
- 1945 – Commander
- 1950 – Captain
- 1958 – Rear admiral
- 1968 – Vice admiral

== Awards and decorations ==
- (Sweden) Commander Grand Cross of the Order of the Sword (4 June 1965)
- (Sweden) Knight of the Order of Vasa
- (Sweden) Swedish Auxiliary Naval Corps's Gold Medal
- (Sweden) Swedish Women's Voluntary Defence Organization's Gold Medal

== Honours ==
- Member of the Royal Swedish Society of Naval Sciences (1942; honorary member in 1958)
- Member of the Royal Swedish Academy of War Sciences (1951)

Military offices
Preceded by Moje Östberg	Inspector of the Naval Artillery; 1950–1955	Succeeded by ?
Preceded by Erik Samuelson	Naval Command South; 1958–1961	Succeeded by Bertil Berthelsson
Preceded by Gunnar Jedeur-Palmgren	Vice Chief of the Royal Swedish Naval Materiel Administration; 1962–1963	Succeeded by Himself as Chief
Preceded by Åke Lindemalm as Chief of the Navy	Chief of the Royal Swedish Naval Materiel Administration; 1963–1968	Succeeded by None
Professional and academic associations
Preceded by Sigurd Lagerman	Chairman of the Royal Swedish Society of Naval Sciences; 1958–1961	Succeeded by Stig Bergelin
