= Sjur =

Sjur is a short form of the Norwegian masculine given name Sigurd originating from the Old Norse given name Sigurðr which means "victory" and "guarding". Sjur is also used as a surname, but is very rare.

== People with the given name ==
- Sjur Aasmundsen Sexe (1808–1888), Norwegian mineralogist
- Sjur Brækhus (1918–2009), Norwegian legal scholar and judge
- Sjur Hansen Halkjeldsvik (1787–1868), Norwegian politician
- Sjur Helgeland (1858–1924), Norwegian hardingfele fiddler and composer from Voss
- Sjur Hopperstad (1930–2015), Norwegian politician for the Centre Party
- Sjur Jarle Hauge (born 1971), Norwegian football coach and former player
- Sjur Johnsen (1891–1978), Norwegian wrestler
- Sjur Lindebrække (1909–1998), Norwegian banker and Conservative Party of Norway politician
- Sjur Loen (born 1958), Norwegian curler and world champion
- Sjur Røthe (born 1988), Norwegian cross-country skier
- Sjur Refsdal (1935–2009), Norwegian astrophysicist, born in Oslo
- Sjur Torgersen (1946–2005), Norwegian ambassador and diplomat
