= Siward =

Siward may refer to:

- Synardus or Siward (12th-century), king of Götaland
- Siward (Abbot of Abingdon) (died 1048), Bishop of St. Martins
- Siward, Earl of Northumbria (died 1055), Anglo-Scandinavian earl of Northumbria (also portrayed as a character in Shakespeare's Macbeth)
- Siward (bishop of Rochester) (died 1075) Bishop of Rochester
- Siward Barn (fl. 1066–1087), English resistor to William the Conqueror
- Richard Siward (died 1248), 13th-century soldier
- Young Siward, a character in William Shakespeare's play Macbeth
- Siward, king of Norway, a probably fictional figure in the Gesta Danorum; see Lagertha

== See also ==
- Seward (disambiguation)
- Sigurd (disambiguation)
