= Scrambled egg (uniform) =

Military embellishments worn on a cap

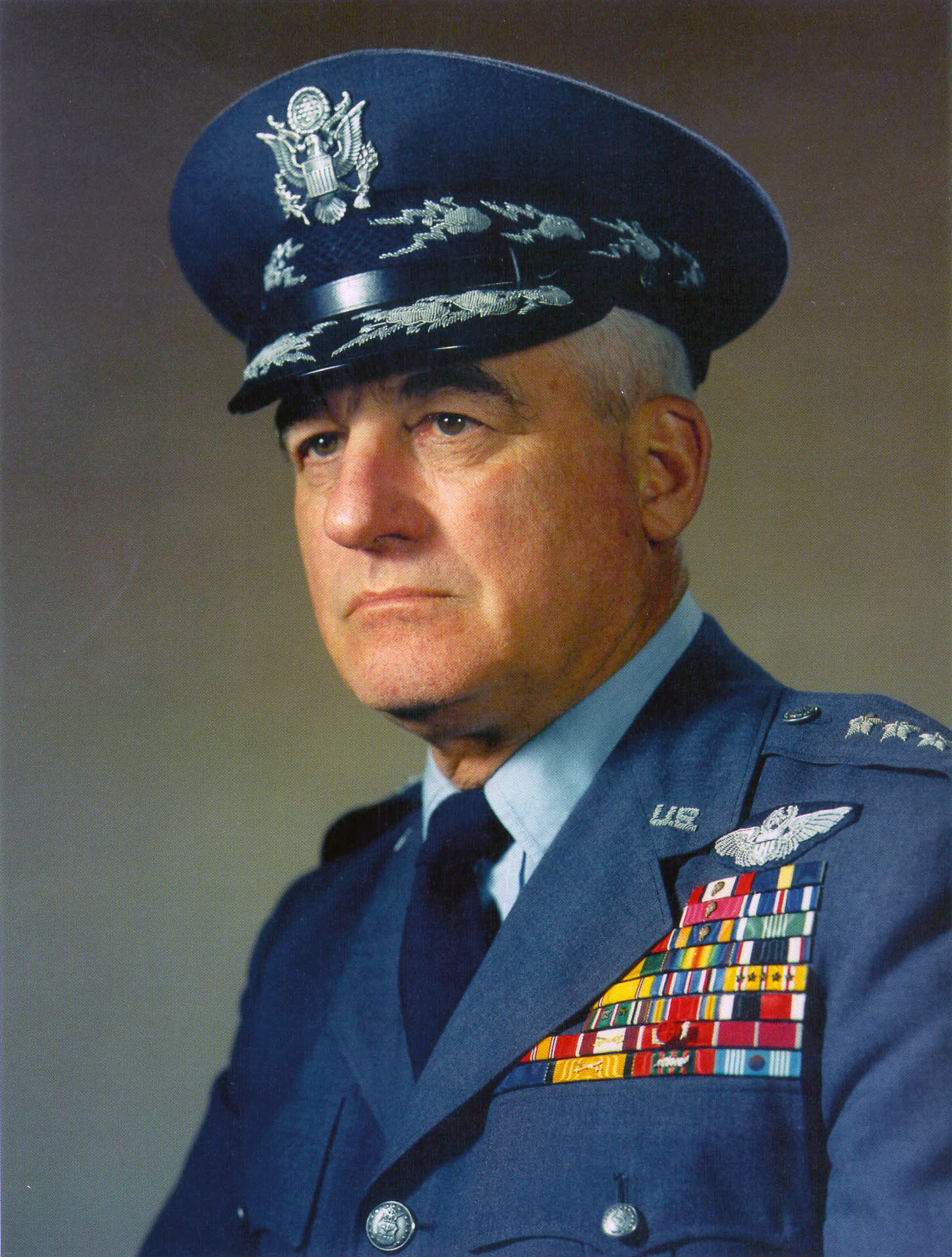
United States Air Force general Nathan F. Twining wearing a service dress cap with scrambled eggs

Scrambled eggs (American English) or scrambled egg (British English) is a slang term for the typically leaf-shaped embellishments found on the visors of peaked caps worn by military officers and (by metonymy) for the senior officers who wear them. The phrase is derived from the resemblance that the emblems have to scrambled eggs, particularly when the embellishments are gold in color.

Today the "scrambled eggs" emblem, in one form or another, has been adopted by the majority of the world's navies. Exceptions include the French Navy and Italian armed forces, which use, respectively, embroideries or different varieties of chin straps on the officers' cap bands to indicate seniority. Although the use of the term is principally military, some civilians (such as airline and merchant ship captains, and senior uniformed law enforcement officers) have similar embellishments on the peaks or visors of their hats.

== Commonwealth countries ==
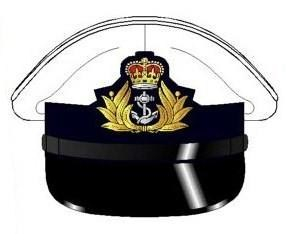
Junior officer's cap

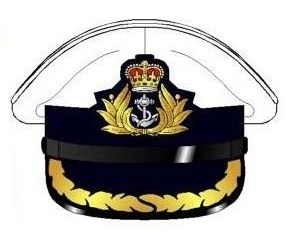
Senior officer's cap

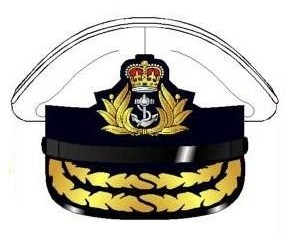
Admiral's cap

In the British Armed Forces, and in the armed forces of several other Commonwealth countries, scrambled egg (singular) is a nickname for the gold braid (called an "oak leaf sprig") on the peak of senior officers' peaked caps, and by extension a nickname for an officer. Specifically, flag officers, general officers, and air officers have two rows of golden oak leaves, while commodores, captains, and commanders (Royal Navy), brigadiers and colonels (Army), and group captains (RAF) have one row.

Amongst the one-star ranks there is disparity. Specifically, as Navy commodores are not classified as flag officers and Army brigadiers are not general officers, they only have one row of golden oak leaves. However, the equivalent (but lower in precedence) Air Force rank of air commodore is classified as an air officer and hence has two rows of golden oak leaves. Disparities also exist at the OF-4 rank level with Navy commanders having one row of golden oak leaves whereas their Army and RAF counterparts (lieutenant colonel and wing commander) do not have any embellishments on their peaks.

In the Canadian Armed Forces, all junior commissioned officers ranked Captain/Lieutenant (Royal Canadian Navy) and below wear a plain gold braid on the visor of their forage caps in place of the oak leaves reserved for senior officers.

== United States ==
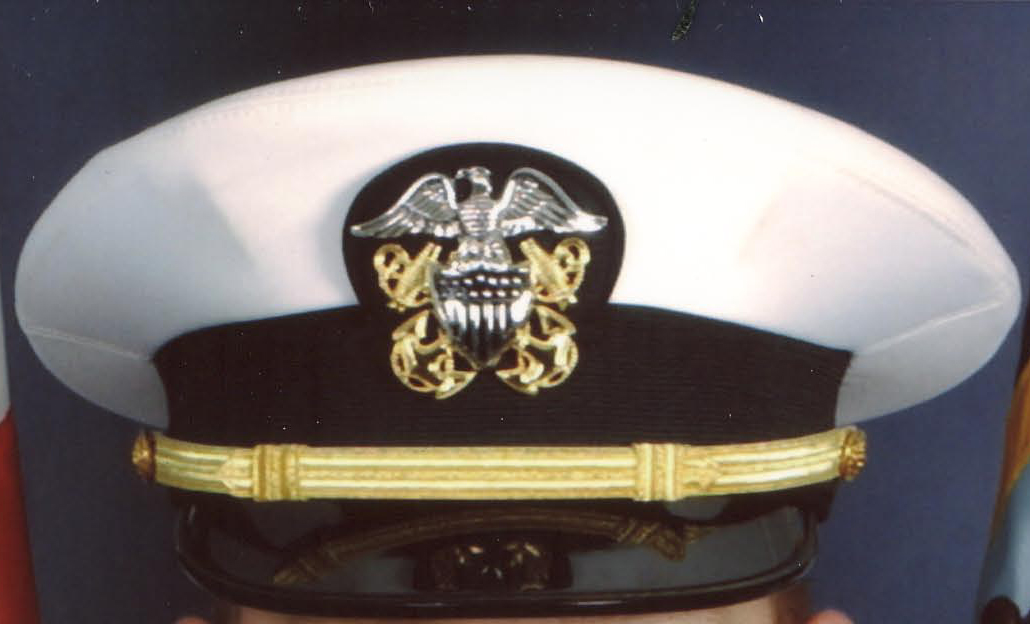
Navy lieutenant commander or below

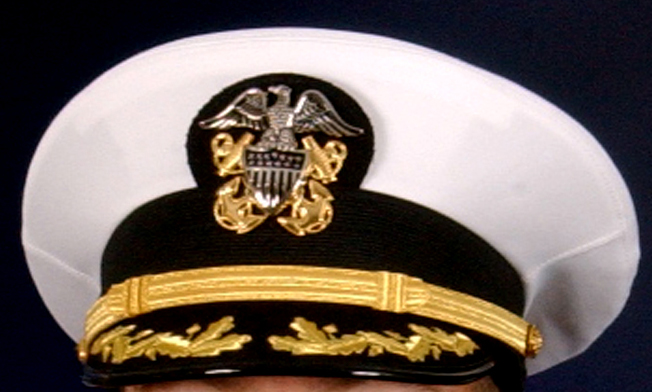
Navy commander or captain

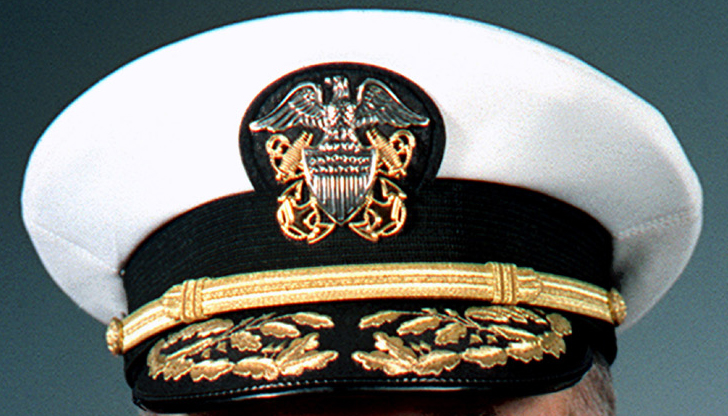
Navy flag officer

In the United States armed forces and United States Uniformed Services, "scrambled eggs" is the nickname for the golden oak leaf and acorn embellishments (known as fretting) on the bills (visors) of framed service and dress uniform caps (called service caps in the Army, combination covers in the Navy and Coast Guard, barracks covers in the Marine Corps) worn by field grade and general officers in the rank and grade of major (O-4) or higher in the Army and Marine Corps, and senior and flag officers in the rank and grade of commander (O-5) or higher in the Navy and Coast Guard. Commissioned Officers of the National Oceanic and Atmospheric Administration wear similar uniforms and wear the same embellishments as the Navy while Commissioned Officers of the Public Health Service wear similar uniforms and wear the same embellishments as the Navy or Coast Guard depending upon the duties they are performing.

Majors (O-4) and higher ranks in the Air Force and Space Force wear silver clouds and lightning bolts in lieu of oak leaves, sometimes referred to as "farts and darts". Majors (O-4), Lieutenant Colonels (O-5), and Colonels (O-6) wear silver clouds and lightning bolts where there are two clouds on each side of the visor while all Generals (O-7 to O-10) wear silver clouds and lightning bolts where there are three clouds on each side. Additionally, Generals serving as the Chief of Staff of the Air Force (CSAF) or as the Chairman or Vice Chairman of the Joint Chiefs of Staff (CJCS, VJCS) wears a row of silver clouds and lightning bolts around the cap band of their service caps or dress caps.

The difference in grades when an officer assumes the wearing of embellishments is peculiar to the individual customs and traditions of each service. Due to the historical origins of naval Lieutenants and Commanders, a naval O-4 was historically classified as a senior type of Lieutenant rather than a junior type of Commander. Accordingly, the Army, Marine Corps, Air Force, and Space Force consider the grade of O-4 to be the first field grade officer rank, while the Navy and Coast Guard consider O-4 to still be a junior officer rank.

At the flag or general officer level, O-7 and higher, additional embellishments are added to distinguish them from the USN/USCG senior officer and USA/USAF/USMC/USSF field grade officer ranks.

== Civilian usage ==
"Eggs" is also used to nickname the leaf-shaped visor decorations on the peaked caps of merchant ships' captains also indicated as shipmasters and airline pilots. By convention this is reserved to Captains or Deputy-Captains (of four-striped rank), in contrast to the Anglo-American naval traditions, where officers of Commander rank and above are entitled to it. Moreover, in the case of airline pilots, such "leaves" may be oak+leaf or laurel-leaf and may be gold or silver in colour, depending on individual airline uniform.

Many American police chiefs, sheriffs, and command staff law enforcement officers such as assistant chiefs and majors may wear scrambled eggs on their ball caps or dress covers' visors. Additionally, fire chiefs, rescue squad chiefs, assistant chiefs, senior fire marshals, and other senior ranking personnel such as battalion chiefs may also wear scrambled eggs on the visors of their ball cap and dress cover visors

In 1969, the Seattle Pilots of MLB's American League wore caps with gold scrambled eggs on the visor. The team failed financially, however, and moved to Milwaukee to become the Milwaukee Brewers. This was the only time in the history of Major League Baseball where a visor had any embellishments.

== See also ==
- RAF slang
