= Rear admiral (Sweden) =

Rank in the Swedish Navy

- Flag of the rear admiral, Swedish Navy.

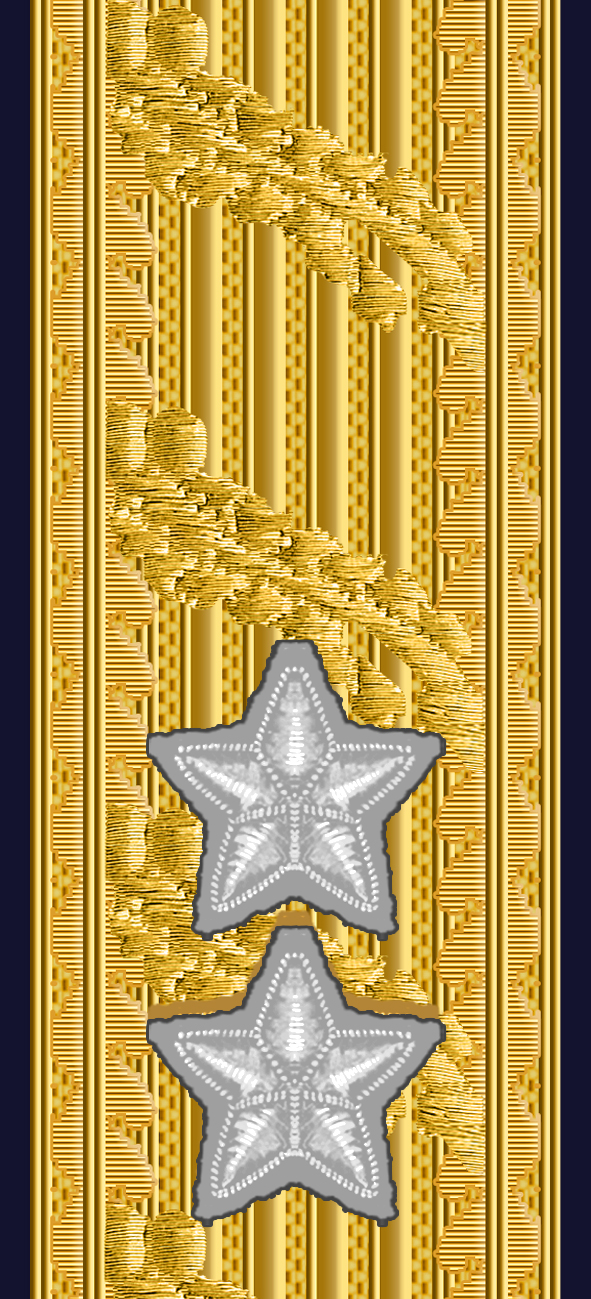
- Shoulder mark of a Swedish two-star rear admiral.

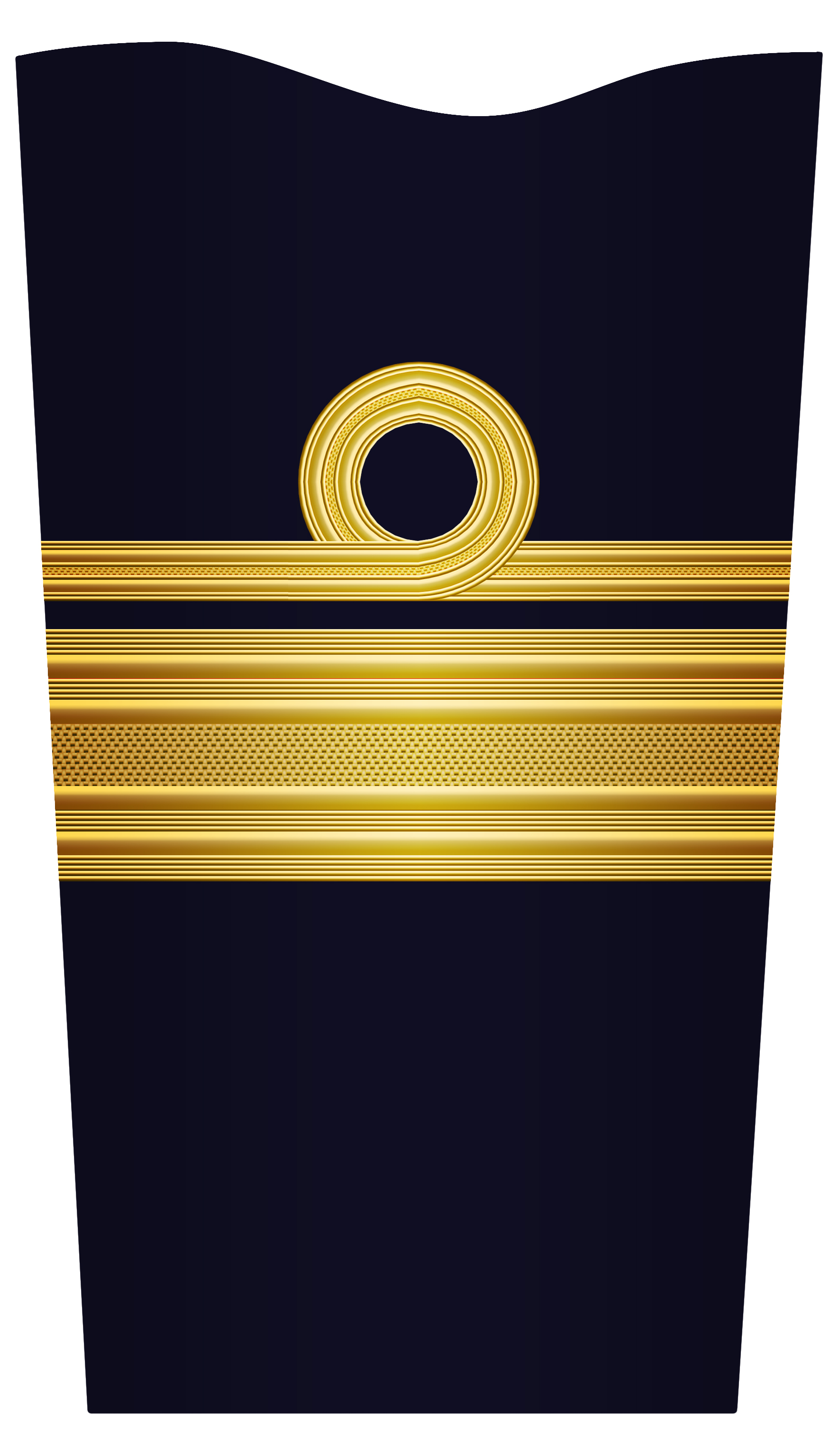
- Sleeve insignia of a Swedish two-star rear admiral.
- Country: Sweden
- Service branch: Swedish Navy
- Abbreviation: Kam (Swedish), RAdm (English)
- Rank: Two-star (Note: Rear admiral was a one-star rank until 1972 and vice admiral was the two-star rank in the Swedish Armed Forces rank structure.)
- NATO rank code: OF-07
- Non-NATO rank: O-8
- Next higher rank: Vice admiral
- Next lower rank: Rear admiral (lower half) (2000–); Senior captain (1972–2000); Captain (–1972)
- Equivalent ranks: Major general

Rear admiral (RAdm) (Swedish: konteramiral, Kam) is a two-star commissioned naval officer rank in the Swedish Navy. Rear admiral ranks above rear admiral (lower half) and below vice admiral. Rear admiral is equivalent to the rank of major general.

== History ==
In Sweden, the admiral's rank first appeared during the reign of Gustav I, who in 1522 gave it to Erik Fleming, a Council of the Realm. During Gustav's reign as king and throughout the latter part of the 16th century, the highest command of a fleet was led by a översteamiral ("colonel admiral"), to whose assistant a underamiral was appointed. It was not until 1569 that a permanent översteamiral was appointed; In 1602 the title was exchanged for riksamiral ("Admiral of the Realm"). The first permanent underamiral was appointed in 1575; his office ceased in 1619. Vice admiral is first mentioned in 1577. The admirals of the Swedish Navy have, incidentally, been as follows: generalamiral ("general admiral"), amiralgeneral ("admiral general"), storamiral ("grand admiral"), överamiral, riksviceamiral ("Vice Admiral of the Realm"), amiralgenerallöjtnant ("admiral lieutenant general"), amirallöjtnant ("lieutenant admiral"), schoutbynacht and konteramiral ("rear admiral").

Rear admiral is equivalent to the rank of major general in the Swedish Army, the Swedish Air Force, the Swedish Coastal Artillery (until 2000) and as well as in the Swedish Amphibious Corps (from 2000). Historically, the Chief of the Naval Staff was often a rear admiral (or a major general in the Swedish Coastal Artillery) and the Commander-in-Chief of the Coastal Fleet. The Inspector (General) of the Navy (1998–2013) position was a flag officer with the rank of rear admiral. The current Chief of Navy (2014–present) position is a rear admiral.

Following a proposal from the Swedish Armed Forces, the Government of Sweden decides on employment as a rear admiral.

In everyday speech, rear admirals are addressed as admirals.

== Uniform ==
=== Shoulder mark ===
The shoulder mark of a Swedish rear admiral contains a 45 mm galloon m/51 and two (Note: Two stars has been used for an rear admiral since 1972. Before that it was one star.) 25 mm star m/30 in silver embroidery on a white background: The center distance between the stars on the shoulder mark must be 27 mm.

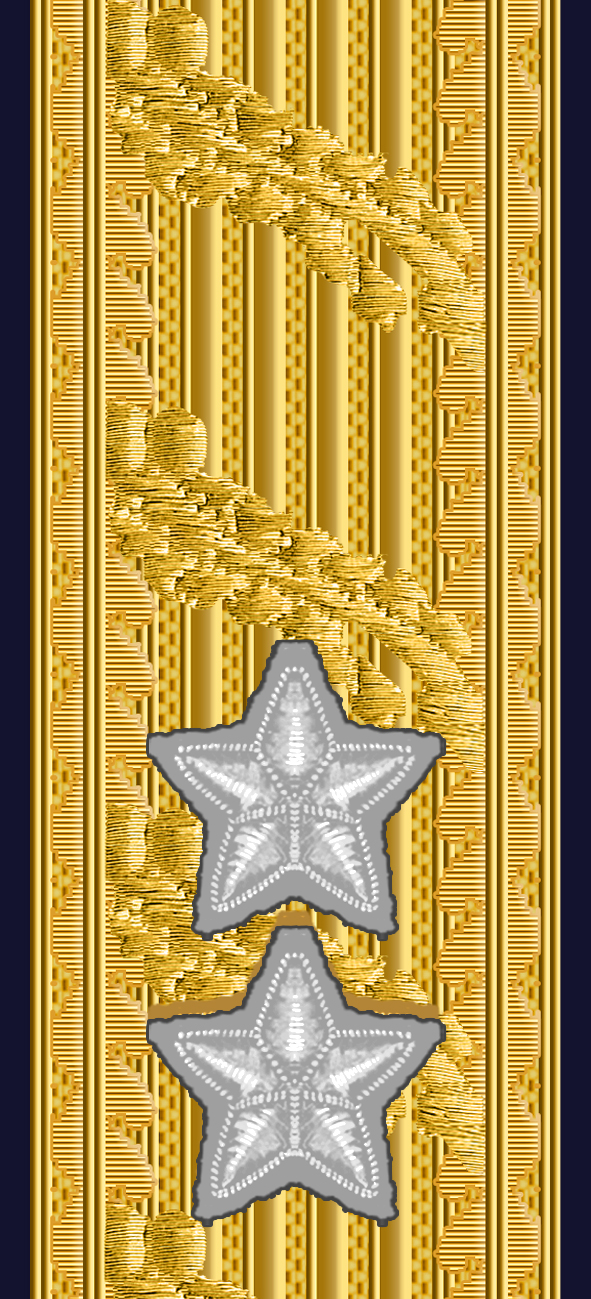
Shoulder mark of a Swedish rear admiral (1972–present)

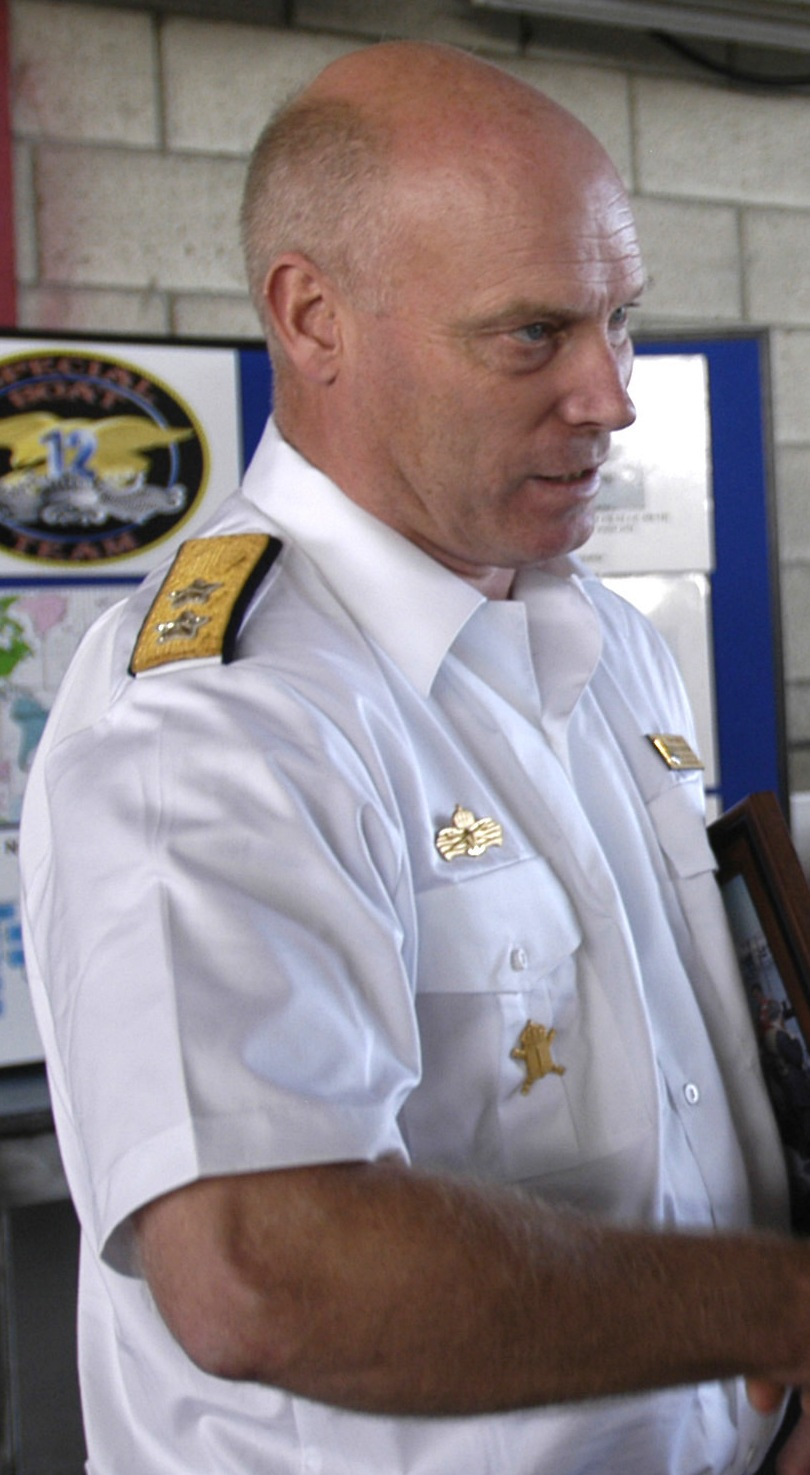
Rear Admiral Anders Grenstad with shoulder mark of a Swedish rear admiral (1972–present)

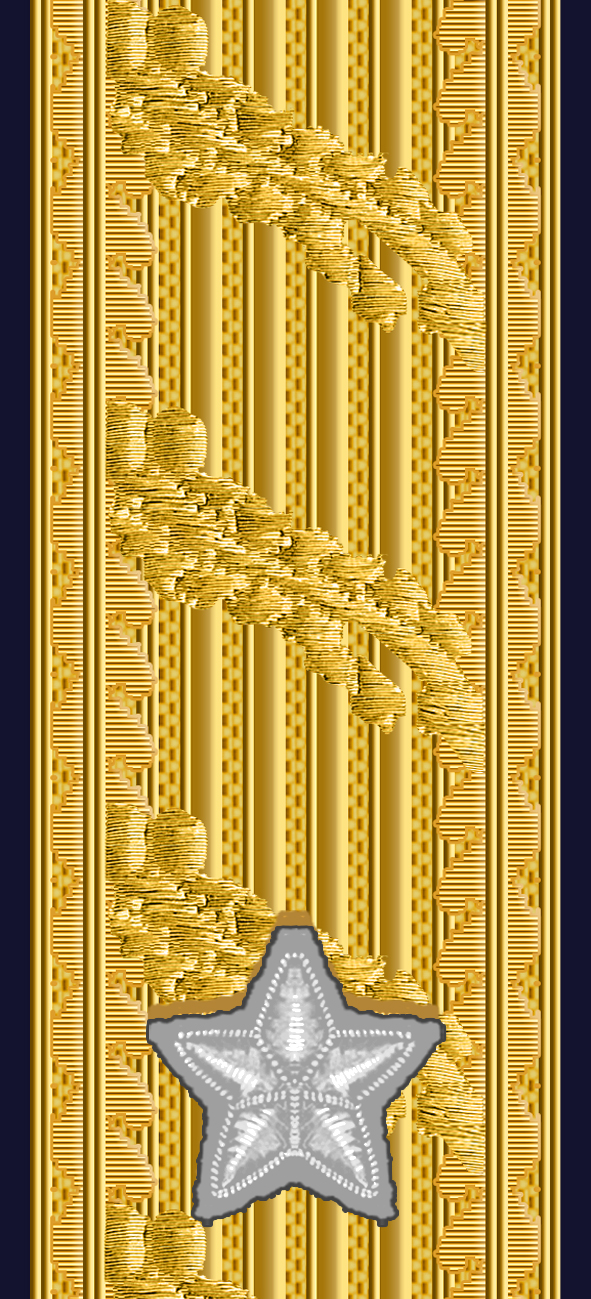
Shoulder mark of a Swedish rear admiral (1878–1972)

=== Sleeve insignia ===
A flag officer wears on the sleeves a 45 mm galloon (GALON M/51 45MM K) and a rank insignia (GRADBETECKNING M/02 TILL ÄRM FLOTTAN) (round loop, the Amphibious Corps has a pointed loop in form of a grenade).

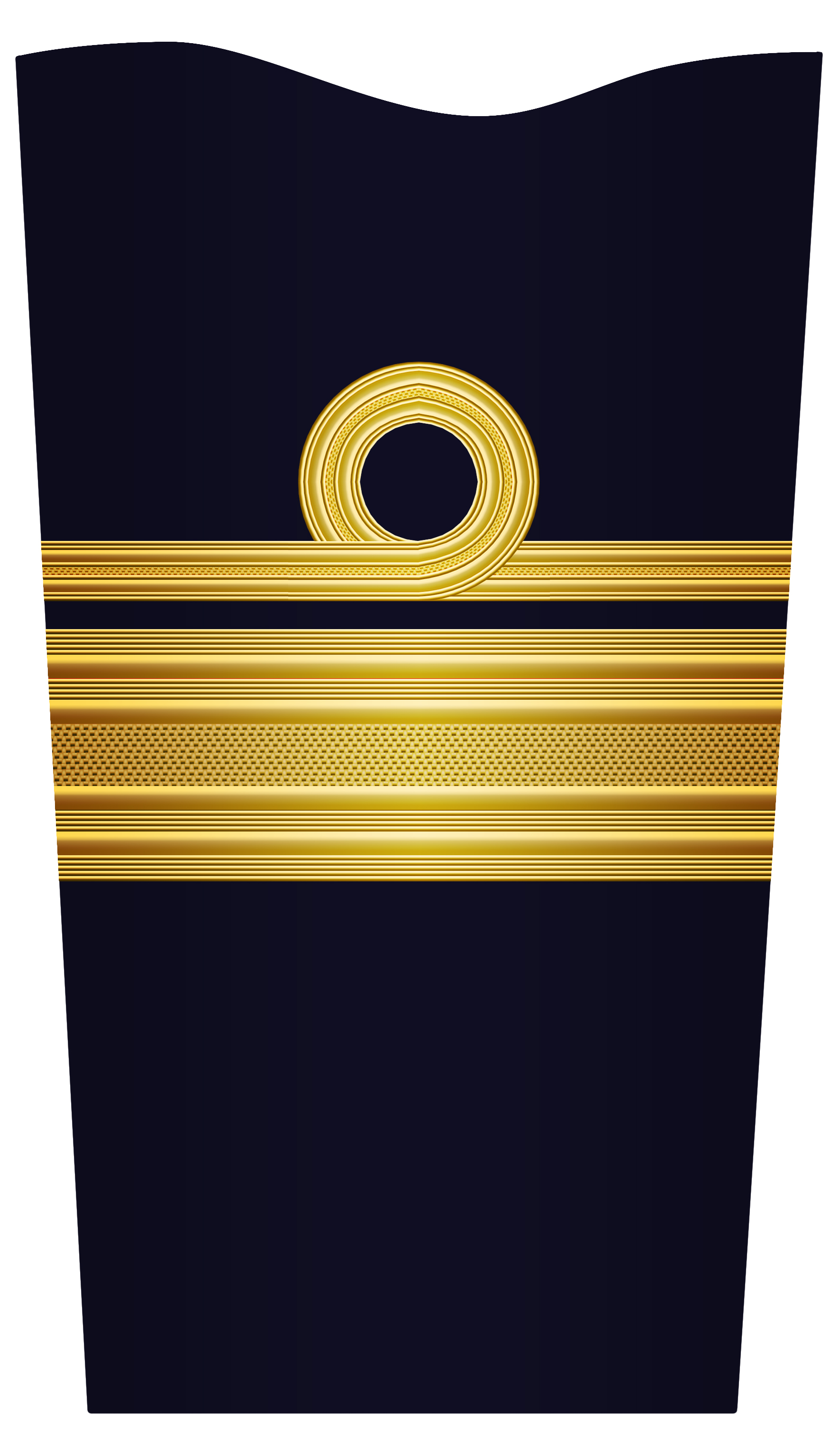
Sleeve insignia for a rear admiral (2003–present)

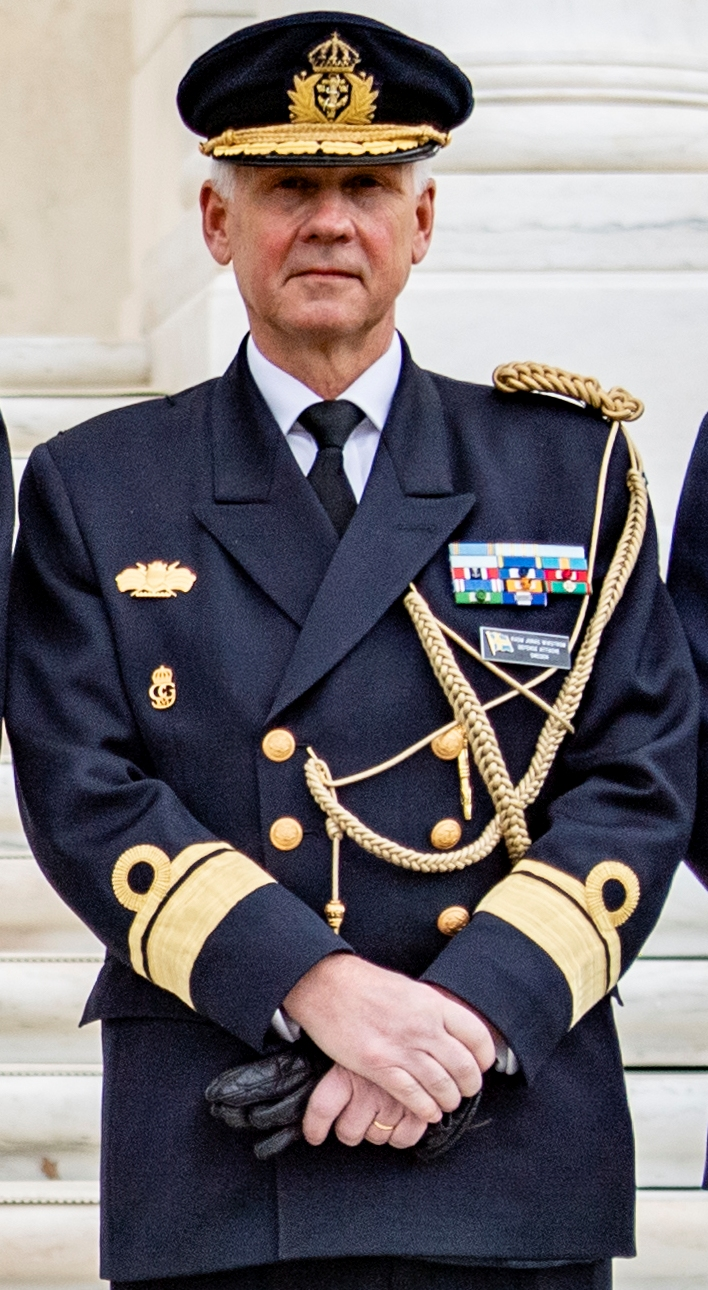
Rear Admiral Jonas Wikström with current sleeve insignia for a rear admiral (2003–present)

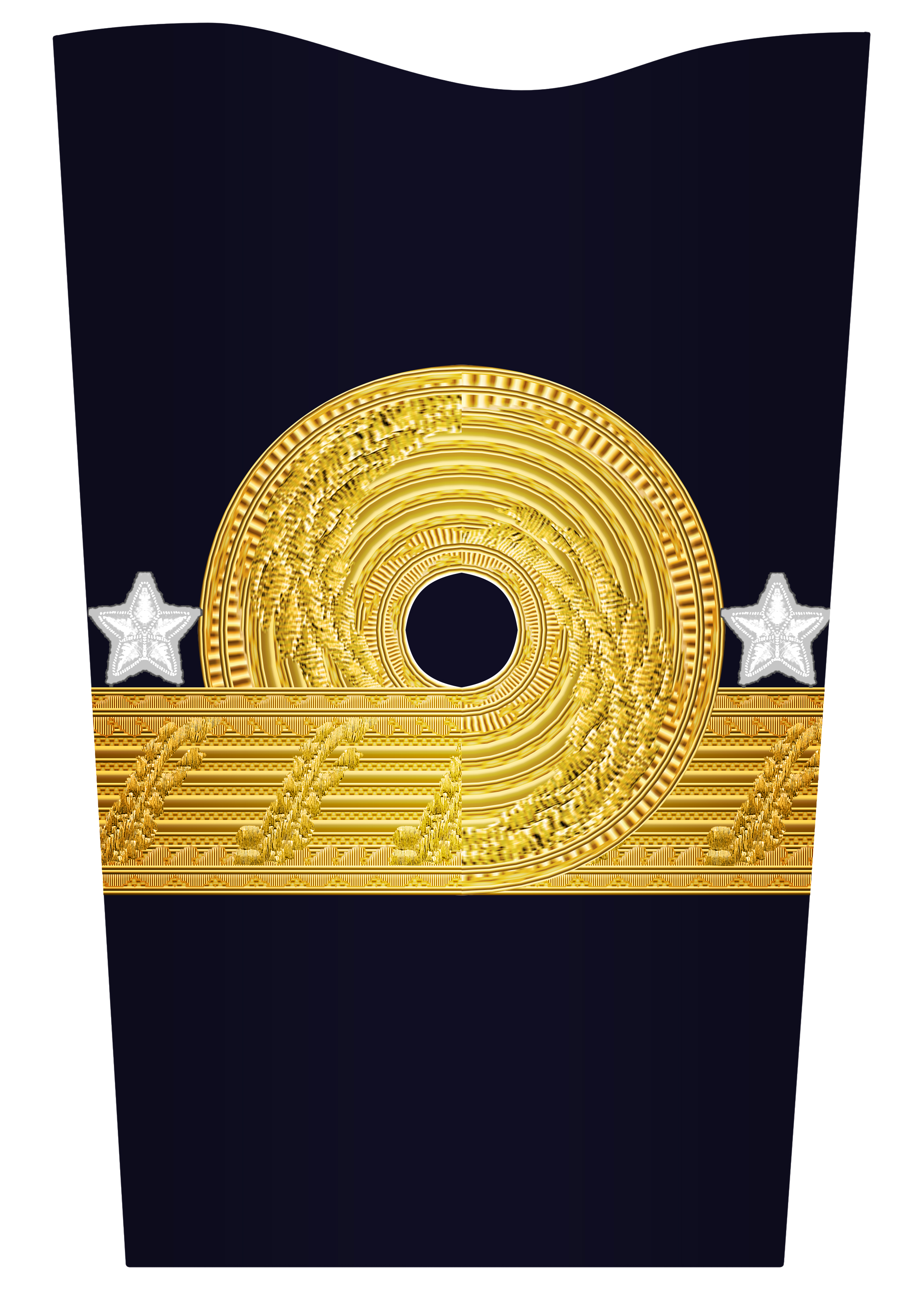
Sleeve insignia for a rear admiral (1972–2003)

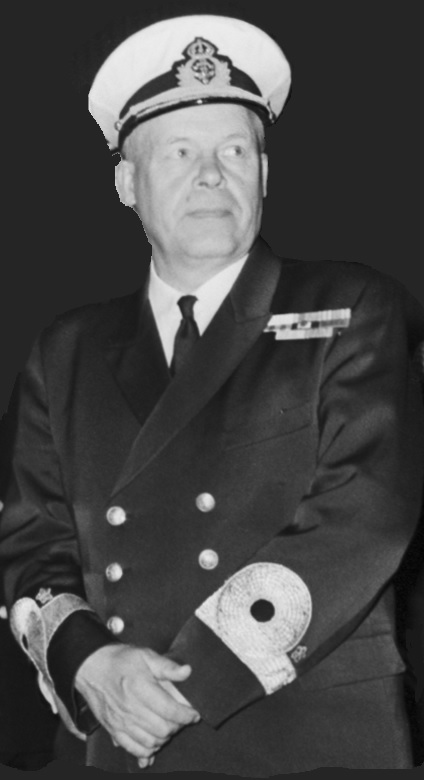
Rear Admiral Sten Swedlund with old sleeve insignia for a rear admiral (1972–2003)

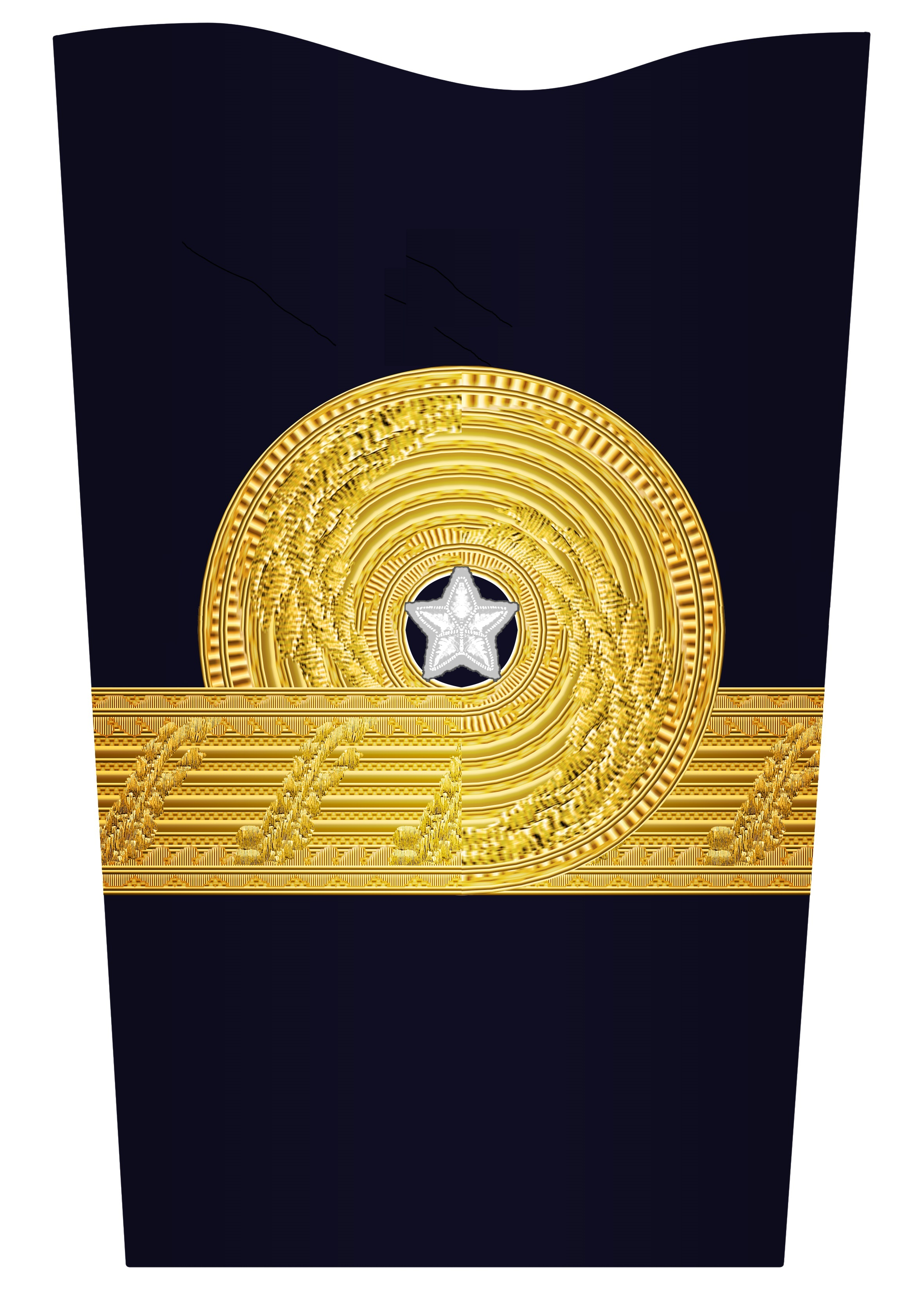
Sleeve insignia for a rear admiral (1878–1972)

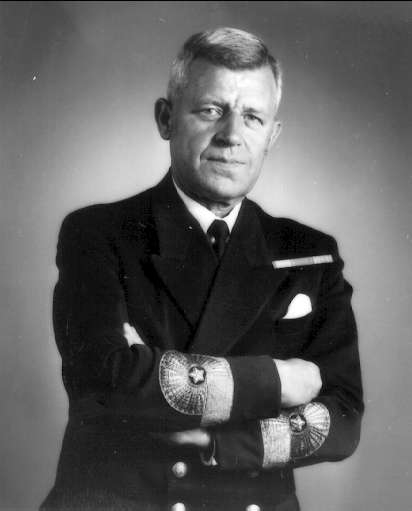
Rear Admiral Oscar Krokstedt with old sleeve insignia for a rear admiral (1878–1972)

=== Hats ===
==== Peaked cap ====
A flag officer wears as embellishments a gold embroidered oak leaf wreath (known as scrambled egg) on the visor of the peaked cap (skärmmössa m/48). It also fitted with a hat badge (mössmärke m/78 off för flottan) and with a strap in form of a golden braid.

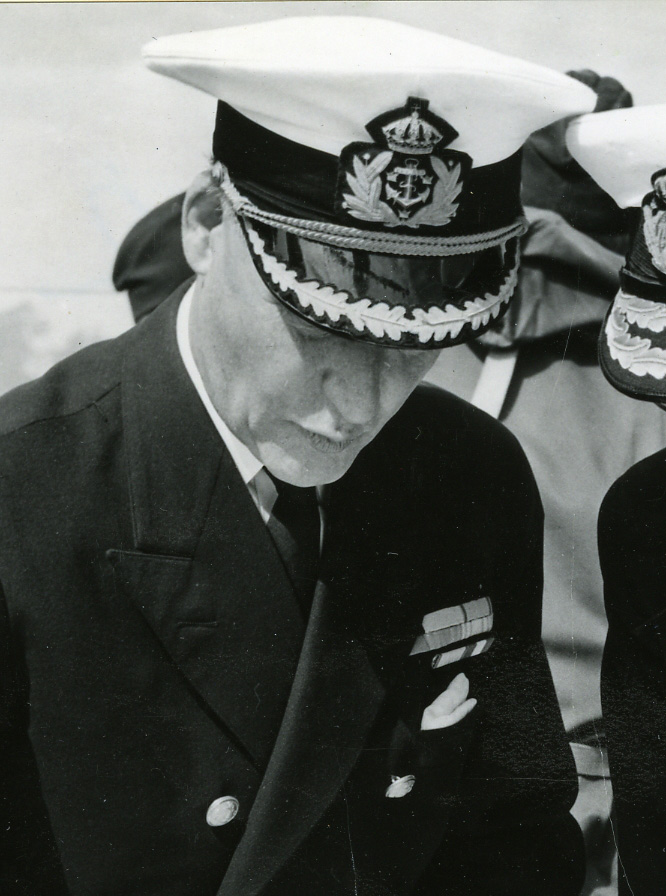
Peaked cap worn by Stig H:son Ericson.

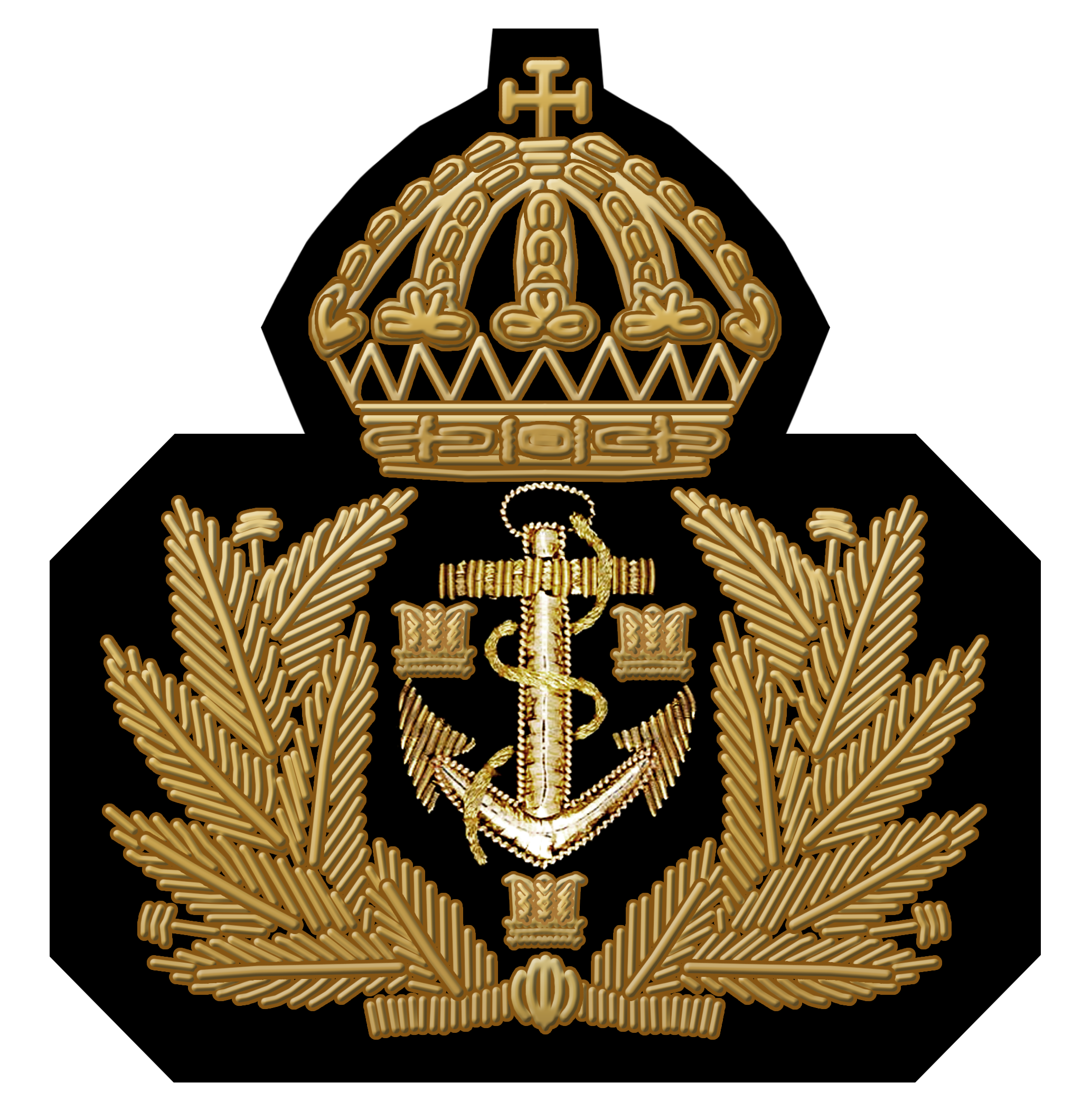
Hat badge

==== Side cap and winter hat ====
An officer wears a hat badge (mössmärke m/78 off) for the navy and another (mössmärke m/87 off) for amphibious units on the side cap (båtmössa m/48) and on the winter hat (vintermössa m/87).

== Personal flags ==
Admiral's command flag, which admirals of all ranks carry on ships, where they are as commanders. On a three-masted ship, a rear admiral's flag flies on the top of the mizzen-mast (admiral's flies on top of the main mast and vice admiral's on top of the fore-mast). The command flag of a rear admiral (and a major general) is a double swallowtailed Swedish flag. In the first blue field 2 five-pointed white stars beside each other (before 1972 by one in the same place).

The flag of the rear admiral (and admiral and vice admiral) is flown on ships of the navy, from which officer of the rank now mentioned exercises his command, or on which he travels in the service, but not on ships on which he is in the capacity of exercise leader.

A flag officer (for example rear admiral) who holds the position of Supreme Commander, Chief of Operations, Chief of Navy, Chief of Maritime Component Command or naval force commander, may carry an admiral flag on a car in which the commander in question travels in uniform. On airplanes/helicopters, rear admirals (flag officers) may carry a command sign in the form of an image of an admiral flag.

Rear admiral/Major general command flag (2 stars) (1972–present)

Rear admiral command flag (1 star) (1905–1972)

Rear admiral command flag (1875–1905)

Rear admiral command flag (1836–1844)

== Gun salute ==
When raising or lowering flags of the commander's, squadron, department or division commander, a gun salute is given with 13 rounds for rear admiral (17 for admiral and 15 for vice admiral).
