= Erik af Klint (1901–1981) =

Swedish Navy naval officer (1901–1981)

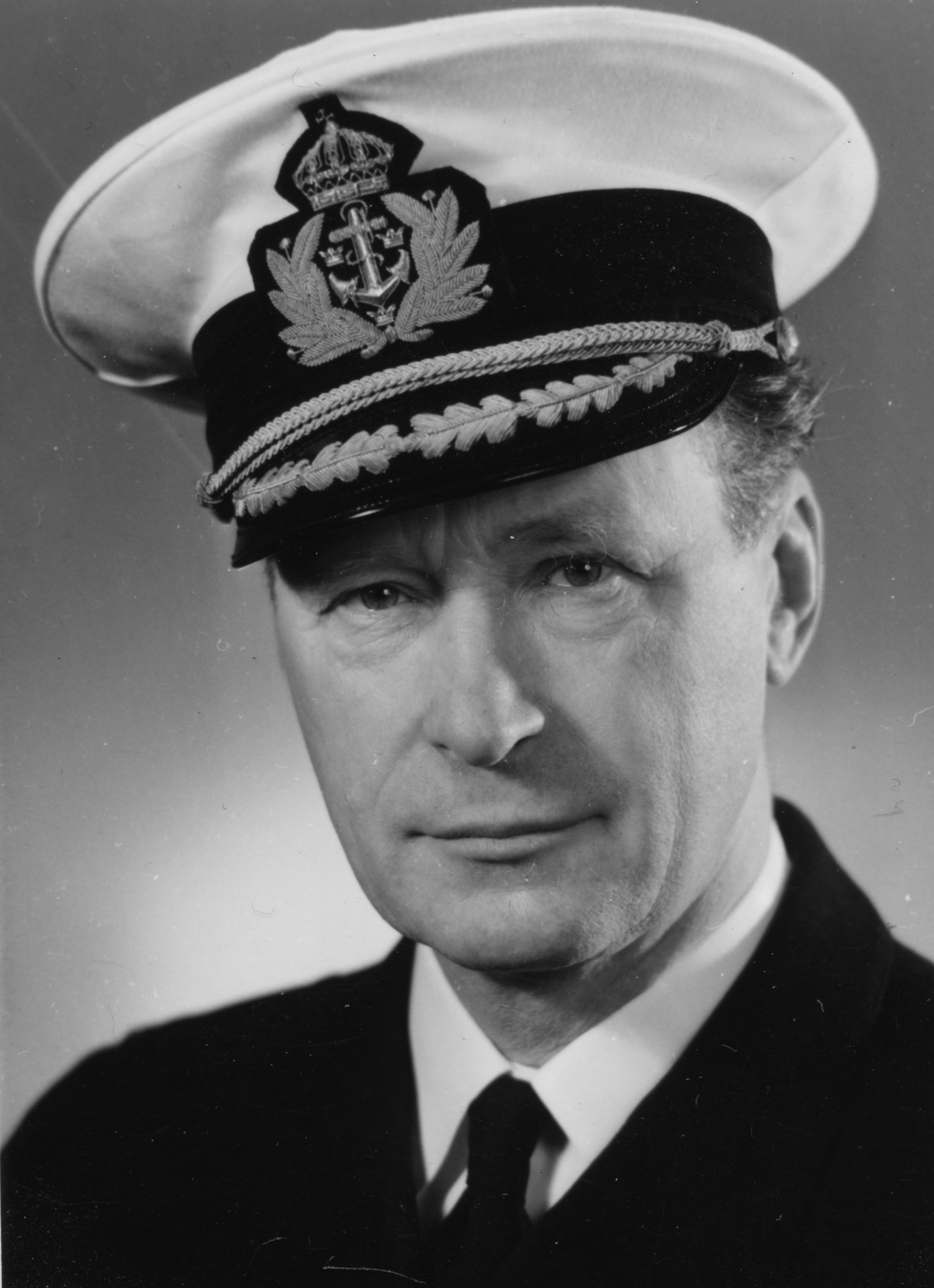
- Born: 12 March 1901; Stockholm, Sweden
- Died: 26 December 1981 (aged 80); Ekerö, Sweden
- Burial place: Galärvarvskyrkogården
- Military career
- Allegiance: Sweden
- Branch: Swedish Navy
- Service years: 1923–1966
- Rank: Vice Admiral
- Nickname: Erik Viktor Philip Gustafsson af Klint
- Commands: HSwMS Oscar II; HSwMS Drottning Victoria; Flag captain; HSwMS Tre Kronor; Section 2, Defence Staff; Commander-in-Chief of the Coastal Fleet; Naval Command East

Vice Admiral Erik Viktor Philip Gustafsson af Klint (12 March 1901 – 26 December 1981) was a Swedish Navy naval officer. Af Klint's senior commands included postings as chief of staff of the Coastal Fleet, head of Section 2 of the Defence Staff, commander-in-chief of the Coastal Fleet and commanding officer of the Naval Command East.

== Early life ==
Af Klint was born on 12 March 1901 in Stockholm, Sweden, the son of Rear Admiral Gustaf af Klint and his wife Elisabet (née Helling). He was the brother of Börje af Klint (1903–1989), artillery director at AB Bofors and Captain (N) Viktor af Klint (1904–1986). His aunt was the pioneer abstract artist Hilma af Klint. Af Klint passed studentexamen in 1920.

== Career ==
Af Klint was commissioned as a naval officer in 1923. He was promoted to sub-lieutenant (Löjtnant) in 1925 and attended the staff course at the Royal Swedish Naval Staff College from 1930 to 1931. He served as a flag adjutant from 1935 to 1938 and was promoted to lieutenant (Kapten) in 1937. He served as a teacher of tactics at the Royal Swedish Naval Staff College, a position which he held in two tours until 1942, interrupted from 1939 to 1941 by service in the Defence Staff. In 1942, he was promoted to lieutenant commander and was appointed adjutant in the Royal Court and appointed head of department in the Naval Staff. In 1945, af Klint was promoted to commander and then served as captain of HSwMS Oscar II from 1945 to 1946, of the HSwMS Drottning Victoria from 1946 to 1947 and of the HSwMS Tre Kronor from 1947 to 1948.

In 1950, af Klint was appointed chief aide-de-camp (överadjutant) to His Majesty the King. Af Klint was promoted to captain in 1950 and served as flag captain from 1950 to 1951 and as head of Section 2 of the Defence Staff from 1951 to 1953, when he was promoted to rear admiral. From 1953 to 1957, af Klint served as commander-in-chief of the Coastal Fleet. He then served as commanding officer of the Naval Command East from 1957 to 1966, when he was promoted to vice admiral and retired from the military. In 1967, af Klint was appointed cabinet chamberlain to His Majesty the King Gustaf VI Adolf.

== Personal life ==
In 1934 he married Ulla Wibom (1912–2007), the daughter of Commander Ivar Wibom and Siri (née Hedblom). They had three children: Gustaf (1935–2010), Johan (born 1939) and Elisabet (born 1940).

The votive ship hanging in Adelsö Church was built by af Klint and his father.

Hilma af Klint bequeathed her entire work to her nephew Erik af Klint. In 1972 — after the Moderna Museet rejected the collection — he let a foundation take over ownership. Erik af Klint wrote in the statutes that the majority of the board should belong to the Anthroposophical Society, because the artist had a strong interest in anthroposophy.

== Death ==
Af Klint died on 26 December 1981 in Ekerö Municipality, Sweden. The funeral service was held on 8 January 1982 in Skeppsholmen Church. He was interred on 19 May 1982 at Galärvarvskyrkogården in Stockholm.

== Dates of rank ==
- 19?? – Acting sub-lieutenant
- 1925 – Sub-lieutenant
- 1937 – Lieutenant
- 1942 – Lieutenant commander
- 1945 – Commander
- 1950 – Captain
- 1953 – Rear admiral
- 1966 – Vice admiral

== Awards and decorations ==
=== Swedish ===
- (Sweden) King Gustaf V's Jubilee Commemorative Medal (1948)
- (Sweden) Commander Grand Cross of the Order of the Sword (4 June 1960)
- (Sweden) Commander 1st Class of the Order of the Sword (5 June 1954)
- (Sweden) Commander of the Order of the Sword (6 June 1953)
- (Sweden) Knight of the Order of the Sword (1943)
- (Sweden) Knight of the Order of Vasa (1938)
- (Sweden) Swedish Naval Volunteers' Gold Medal (Sjövärnskårens guldmedalj)
- (Sweden) StockhfkGM

=== Foreign ===
- (Norway) Grand Cross of the Order of St. Olav (1 July 1972)
- (Netherlands) Grand Cross of the Order of the House of Orange
- (Iceland) Grand Cross of the Order of the Falcon (5 May 1971)
- (Denmark) Commander 1st Class of the Order of the Dannebrog
- (France) Commander of the Legion of Honour
- (Finland) 3rd Class of the Order of the Cross of Liberty with Swords
- (Norway) Knight 1st Class of the Order of St. Olav
- (Denmark) King Christian X's Liberty Medal

== Honours ==
- Member of the Royal Swedish Society of Naval Sciences (1941)
- Member of the Royal Swedish Academy of War Sciences (1951)
- Honorary member of the Royal Swedish Society of Naval Sciences (1953)

Military offices
Preceded by John Wirström	Flag captain 1950–1951	Succeeded by Bertil Berthelsson
Preceded by Moje Östberg	Section 2 of the Defence Staff; 1951–1953	Succeeded by Holger Henning
Preceded by Stig H:son Ericson	Commander-in-Chief of the Coastal Fleet; 1953–1957	Succeeded by Bertil Berthelsson
Preceded by Erik Anderberg	Naval Command East; 1957–1966	Succeeded by Einar Blidberg
