= Bertil Berthelsson =

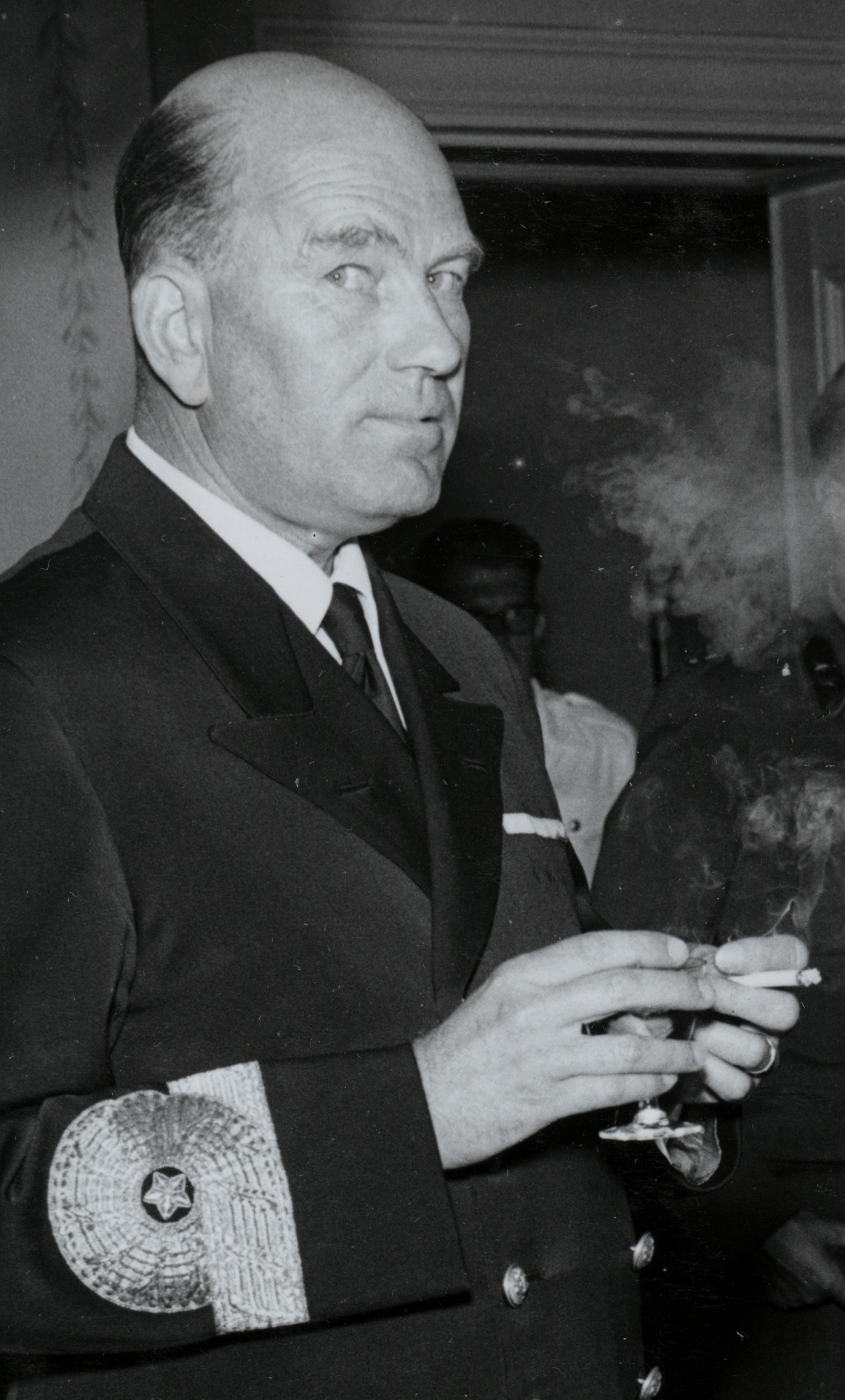
- Berthelsson as rear admiral.
- Born: 11 April 1902; Njurunda, Sweden
- Died: 11 February 1977 (aged 74); Västerhaninge, Sweden
- Military career
- Allegiance: Sweden
- Branch: Swedish Navy
- Service years: 1926–1967
- Rank: Vice Admiral
- Nickname: Alfred Erik Bertil Berthelsson
- Commands: HSwMS Karlskrona; HSwMS Stockholm; HSwMS Tre Kronor; Flag captain; Chief of the Naval Staff; Commander-in-Chief of the Coastal Fleet; Naval Command South

Vice Admiral Alfred Erik Bertil Berthelsson (11 April 1902 – 11 February 1977) was a senior naval officer in the Swedish Navy. Berthelsson served as flag captain (1951–1953), as Chief of the Naval Staff (1953–1957), as Commander-in-Chief of the Coastal Fleet (1957–1961) and as commanding officer of the Naval Command South (1961–1966).

== Early life ==
Berthelsson was born on 11 April 1902 in Njurunda Parish, Västernorrland County, Sweden, the son of Alfred Berthelsson, a merchant, and his wife Anna Backman. He passed studentexamen in Örebro in 1920, after which in 1921 he enlisted as a telegraphist in the Swedish Navy, where he reached the rank of Corporal. After two years of service, mostly on the torpedo cruiser HSwMS Claes Horn, Berthelsson was accepted in the summer of 1923 as a naval cadet and underwent regular training at the Royal Swedish Naval Academy.

== Career ==
Berthelsson was commissioned as a naval officer in 1926 with the rank of acting sub-lieutenant. After service as an acting sub-lieutenant on the coastal defence ship Sverige with Göran Wahlström as executive officer and long voyage with the cruiser HSwMS Fylgia to South America, Berthelsson began his training as an air scout. During the 1930s, he came during a number of different tours of duty to deal with the air operational issues in the navy, during which he served for a year 1933-34 in the Air Staff. During the same period, he underwent training as a torpedo officer with tours of duty on the destroyers Ehrensköld and Klas Horn. These tours were a good preparation for Berthelsson's passing of the Royal Swedish Naval Staff College's General Course in the winter of 1932-33, which was followed by a Staff Course in the winter of 1934-35. This laid the foundation for decades of work in staff service - on board and ashore - as well as in various investigations. In 1936-37 he served on the coastal defence ship Sverige as an adjutant in the Winter Squadron (Vintereskadern) and in 1937 on the cruiser Gotland as an adjutant of the School Department. This was followed by service in the Naval Staff, among other things as a press officer until the spring of 1939. The contact with the press that he thereby received, he maintained throughout his subsequent service, which benefited him during work in various investigations.

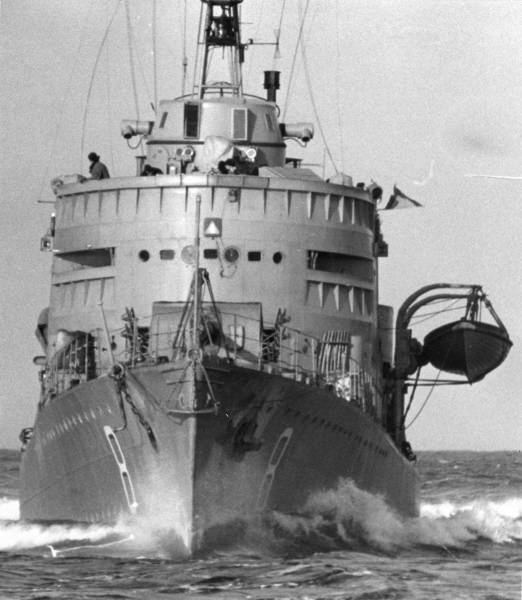
The destroyer Karlskrona, captained by Berthelsson in 1942

In the spring of 1939, Berthelsson took over as flag lieutenant (flaggadjutant) in the Coastal Fleet with Rear Admiral Gösta Ehrensvärd as commander and Captain Helge Strömbäck as flag captain. During the mobilization in the autumn of 1939 and the subsequent years of emergency preparedness, Berthelsson performed one of his superiors' highly esteemed work. It was above all the development of the ships' tactics and the torpedo's effort, both with ships and aircraft, that he had to devote his strength to, but at the same time he had to convey to daily press and radio events and developments to keep in touch with the public. Among other things, he also participated in the publication of various defense magazines and books, which were published by various main authors. After three years in this position, Berthelsson got a long-awaited position as ship captain on the destroyer Karlskrona during the summer of 1942, followed by a similar command on the destroyer Stockholm in 1943. He was largely allowed to conduct escort service in the Baltic Sea for shipping protection against German sea and air forces and Russian submarines, in which he was involved in several incidents. However, in the autumn of 1942, Berthelsson had already taken up the position of teacher in tactics at the Royal Swedish Naval Staff College and in 1943 was appointed lieutenant commander. During his three years as a tactics teacher, the reorganization of ship tactics began, which was conditioned by new weapons and on-board radars, which came to strongly influence the ships' way of behaving both at sea and in the bases. His pioneering work also came to fruition in the 1943 naval inquiry into naval warfare, where he served as secretary with Rear Admiral Gunnar Bjurner as leader. The type of ship, the armored destroyer, which was launched at the time, can be said to have served as a model for the Halland-class destroyers who began to be planned and built in the late 1940s and the Östergötland-class destroyers during the 1950s. His diligent efforts to keep the navy with destroyers at sufficient numbers were a marked feature of his business. Berthelsson's good handling of investigative issues led him to be appointed as an expert in the 1945 Defense Committee as an assistant to the then Rear Admiral Stig H:son Ericson, who was the navy's representative. The inquiry's work led to the Defence Act of 1948.

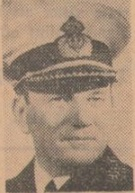
Berthelsson as Captain circa 1951-54.

Berthelsson's longing for a tour of sea duty was satisfied in the autumn of 1947, when he took over as destroyer division commander with base aboard Visby. This annual command was followed by a year as captain of the cruiser HSwMS Tre Kronor. It was important to design the complex tactics of this newly built ship, which was conditioned by the many weapon systems on board. Tre Kronor was therefore allowed to act fairly independently under the command of the captain, during which Berthelsson was free to develop his thoughts on tactics and personnel care. Berthelsson's theoretical and practical knowledge of naval tactics was then used by placing him in the autumn of 1949 as head of the Weapons Control Office (Stridsledningskontoret) of the Royal Swedish Naval Materiel Administration, where he served for two years, during which time he was appointed Captain in 1951. It was a time when Swedish naval ships was fully equipped with radar, both for reconnaissance, combat command and navigation as well as for weapons deployment in many different forms. Berthelsson's great interest in modern development led him to play a leading role in the introduction of the Decca Navigator System for hyperbole navigation in the southern Baltic Sea. The facilities were later transferred to the Swedish Maritime Administration. In the autumn of 1951, Berthelsson was appointed flag captain of the Coastal Fleet, whose commander was Rear Admiral Stig H:son Ericson. This marked the beginning of what was called the "cruiser era" in the Swedish Navy, which came to be about a decade old. During this time, the "squadron tactic" was created, which involved a concentrated attack with at least two squadrons, composed of cruisers, destroyers and torpedo boats.

In the spring of 1953, Berthelsson took over as Chief of the Naval Staff. The emphasis in his work was shifted from the tactical and operational to the organizational and defense policy. Sweden's cooling defense will and the declining appropriations made it necessary to reduce the ship's armaments, while maintaining the high level of preparedness, leaving the ships to be "mothballed". At the organizational reductions, Berthelsson preferred to reduce the land organization in order to keep the crews on board, which led to some contradictions. The increasing number of investigations with which the navy was charged during Berthelsson's time as chief meant that his agility, acquired through dealings with publicists and politicians, came in handy. He had the ability, even when there were major differences from the beginning, to negotiate a compromise that was acceptable to all, which, thanks to his determination and willpower, did not become completely unfavorable to the navy. In 1954 he was promoted to rear admiral. In the spring of 1957, he achieved the goal he had set himself since his youth, namely to take over as Commander-in-Chief of the Coastal Fleet. There he had to continue the same line of development, which he helped to draw up during his time as Captain of the Fleet. He was eager to not only lead the exercises from the flagship but also to embark on the smaller ships in difficult conditions at sea to get to know the conditions of the crews. At the same time, he worked for information about the navy during the ships' visits to ports and he never forgot the requirement for contact with the public. However, in 1958 - due to drastically cut defense spending - the destroyers Lappland and Värmland had to be canceled to get funds available for the acquisition of the ship types that would be part of the new light fleet, which would succeed the cruiser era. Berthelsson took so much offense to this that he suffered both mentally and physically and his health was forever weakened.

In the autumn of 1961, he took over as commanding officer of the Naval Command South, based in Kungshuset in Karlskrona, which was his wife, Marianne's home town. However, it did not take long in his new position before he contracted ill health, which meant that from 1963 until his retirement in 1967 he had to devote himself to special assignments. Berthelsson retired and was promoted to vice admiral in 1967.

== Personal life ==
In 1931, Berthelsson married Marianne Quiding (1905–1989), the daughter of Uno Quiding, a harbor master, and Thyra Uhrström. He was the father of Ulla (born 1933), Ulf (born 1937) and Kang (born 1945).

== Death ==
Berthelsson died on 11 February 1977 in Västerhaninge, Stockholm County. He was interred at Västerhaninge Cemetery on 12 March 1977.

== Dates of rank ==
- 1926 – Acting sub-lieutenant
- 1928 – Underlöjtnant
- 1929 – Sub-lieutenant
- 1938 – Lieutenant
- 1943 – Lieutenant commander
- 1946 – Commander
- 1951 – Captain
- 1954 – Rear admiral
- 1967 – Vice admiral

== Awards and decorations ==
Berthelsson's awards:

=== Swedish ===
- (Sweden) King Gustaf V's Jubilee Commemorative Medal (1948)
- (Sweden) Commander Grand Cross of the Order of the Sword (6 June 1964)
- (Sweden) Knight of the Order of Vasa
- (Sweden) Swedish Women's Voluntary Defence Organization's Gold Medal (Riksförbundet Sveriges lottakårers guldmedalj)
- (Sweden) Stockholms fkGM
- (Sweden) Swedish Shipping and Navy League's Silver Medal (Föreningen Sveriges Flottas förtjänstmedalj i silver)

=== Foreign ===
- (Denmark) Commander of the Order of the Dannebrog
- Commander of the Order of the White Rose of Finland
- (France) Officer of the Legion of Honour
- (Latvia) Latvian Air Force Aviation Badge

== Honours ==
- Member of the Royal Swedish Society of Naval Sciences (1942)
- Member of the Royal Swedish Academy of War Sciences (1953)
- Honorary member of the Royal Swedish Society of Naval Sciences (1954)

== Bibliography ==
- Berthelsson, Bertil (1977). Den långa vägen: utdrag ur viceamiral Bertil Berthelssons dagboksanteckningar under åren 1947-1965 (in Swedish). Stockholm: Decca navigator och radar. SELIBR 403564.

Military offices
Preceded by Erik af Klint	Flag captain 1951–1953	Succeeded by Einar Blidberg
Preceded by Ragnar Wetterblad	Chief of the Naval Staff; 1953–1957	Succeeded by Einar Blidberg
Preceded by Erik af Klint	Commander-in-Chief of the Coastal Fleet; 1957–1961	Succeeded by Einar Blidberg
Preceded by Sigurd Lagerman	Naval Command South; 1961–1966	Succeeded by Stig Bergelin
Professional and academic associations
Preceded by Sigurd Lagerman	Chairman of the Royal Swedish Society of Naval Sciences; 1961–1963	Succeeded by Stig Bergelin
