= Åke Lindemalm =

Swedish Navy officer

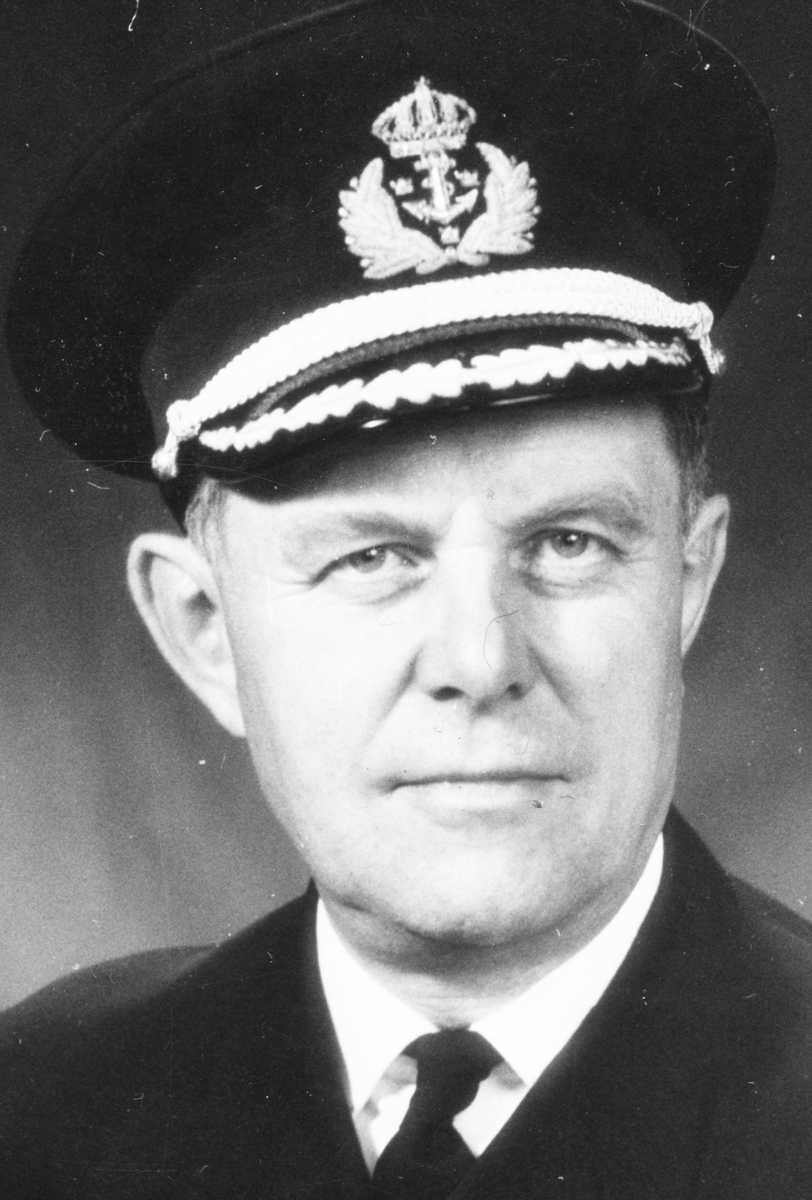
- Born: Åke Fredrik Lindemalm; 26 February 1910; Lima, Sweden
- Died: 30 April 2004 (aged 94); Stockholm, Sweden
- Burial place: Galärvarvskyrkogården
- Military career
- Allegiance: Sweden
- Branch: Swedish Navy
- Service years: 1931–1970
- Rank: Admiral
- Commands: HSwMS Nordkaparen; HSwMS U3; 1st Submarine Flotilla; HSwMS Tre Kronor; Flag Captain; Chief of the Naval Staff; Chief of the Navy

Admiral Åke Fredrik Lindemalm (26 February 1910 – 30 April 2004) was a Swedish Navy officer. He was Acting Chief of the Naval Staff from 1960 to 1961 and Chief of the Navy from 1961 to 1970.

== Early life ==
Lindemalm was born on 26 February 1910 in Lima, Sweden, the son of Oskar Lindemalm, a district medical officer, and his wife Augusta (née Florén). He passed studentexamen at Högre Allmänna Läroverket in Uppsala in 1928.

== Career ==
=== Military career ===
Lindemalm was commissioned as a naval officer with the rank of acting sub-lieutenant (fänrik) in 1931. He was a training officer for the Cabin Boy Corps (Skeppsgossekåren) on the full-rigged ship af Chapman from 1936 to 1937. Lindemalm became an officer cadet in 1938 and spent two and a half years ashore at the Royal Swedish Naval Academy and on a long trip to South America with the seaplane cruiser HSwMS Gotland as well as aboard different cadet ships to form the cadets to prospective officers in the course of 1941. During World War II he served as captain of various submarines. Lindemalm served as captain of submarines HSwMS Nordkaparen and HSwMS U3. Lindemalm was a teacher at the Royal Swedish Naval Staff College from 1948 to 1951. Lindemalm was promoted to lieutenant commander in 1949 and was commanding officer of the 1st Submarine Flotilla in 1951.

Lindemalm then served at the Operations Department of the Naval Staff from 1952 to 1955 and was promoted to commander in 1953. He was captain of the cruiser HSwMS Tre Kronor from 1955 to 1956 and was promoted to captain the following year. Lindemalm served as Flag Captain from 1957 to 1959 and Inspector of the Submarine and Helicopter Service from 1959 to 1961 when he was promoted to rear admiral. He was Acting Chief of the Naval Staff from 1960 to 1961 when he was promoted to vice admiral. Lindemalm was given a "jump-step" promotion which allowed him to advance two ranks, from captain to vice admiral. Lindemalm was first appointed rear admiral in the Admiralty from 1 April 1961 and vice admiral and in the Admiralty and Chief of the Navy from 1 October 1961. For economic reasons had to proceed with the reduction of the number of ships and coastal artillery guns, which his predecessor had begun. However, submarines which was ordered was of high technical quality, the Swedish Coastal Artillery transition to medium and light pieces was started and the helicopter's increased importance for naval warfare was continued by Lindemalm. He retired and was given a tombstone promotion to admiral on 1 October 1970.

=== Later life ===
Lindemalm was board member of the Svenska AB Philips from 1970 to 1982 and chairman of the same from 1974 to 1982. He was board member of the Svenska Philipsföretagen AB from 1977 to 1982 and of the British Scandinavian Aviation AB from 1972 to 1985.

== Personal life ==
In 1934 Lindemalm married Karin Denning (1909–1992), the daughter of Viktor Karlsson and Matilda (née Hagelin). He was the father of Per (born 1939), Gunnar (born 1942) and Mats (born 1944).

== Death ==
Lindemalm died on 30 April 2004 in Stockholm. The funeral service was held on 7 May 2004 in Djurgårdskyrkan on Djurgården in Stockholm. He was interred on 3 June 2004 at Galärvarvskyrkogården in Stockholm.

== Dates of rank ==
- 1931 – Acting sub-lieutenant
- 19?? – Sub-lieutenant
- 19?? – Lieutenant
- 1949 – Lieutenant commander
- 1953 – Commander
- 1957 – Captain
- 1 April 1961 – Rear admiral
- 1 October 1961 – Vice admiral
- 1 October 1970 – Admiral

== Awards and decorations ==
=== Swedish ===
- (Sweden) Commander Grand Cross of the Order of the Sword (6 June 1963)
- (Sweden) Knight of the Order of Vasa

=== Foreign ===
- (Norway) Grand Cross of the Order of St. Olav (1 July 1967)
- (United States) Commander of the Legion of Merit (1963)

== Honours ==
- Special honorary member of the Lund Academic Officer Society
- Member of the Royal Swedish Society of Naval Sciences (1949, honorary member in 1961))
- Member of the Royal Swedish Academy of War Sciences (1957)

Military offices
Preceded by Einar Blidberg	Flag Captain; 1957–1959	Succeeded by Magnus Starck
Preceded by Einar Blidberg	Chief of the Naval Staff; 1960–1961	Succeeded by Oscar Krokstedt
Preceded by Stig H:son Ericson	Chief of the Navy; 1961–1970	Succeeded by Bengt Lundvall
Professional and academic associations
Preceded by Lage Thunberg	Chairman of the Royal Swedish Academy of War Sciences; 1967–1969	Succeeded by Carl Eric Almgren
Preceded by Dag Arvas	Chairman of the Royal Swedish Society of Naval Sciences; 1969–1970	Succeeded by Bengt Lundvall
