= Stig H:son Ericson =

Swedish Navy officer (1897–1985)

His Excellency Stig H:son Ericson RoKKMO
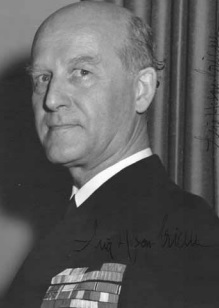
- Born: 12 July 1897; Stockholm, Sweden
- Died: 8 January 1985 (aged 87)
- Burial place: Galärvarvskyrkogården
- Military career
- Allegiance: Sweden
- Branch: Swedish Navy
- Service years: 1918–1961
- Rank: Admiral
- Nickname: Stig (Hansson) H:son Ericson
- Commands: 3rd Destroyer Division; HSwMS Stockholm; Naval Operations Department, Defence Staff; HSwMS Drottning Victoria; Coastal Fleet; Chief of the Navy
- Other work: First Marshal of the Court; Marshal of the Realm

Admiral Stig (Hansson) H:son Ericson RoKKMO (12 July 1897 – 8 January 1985) was a Swedish Navy naval officer. He was Commander-in-Chief of the Coastal Fleet from 1950 to 1953 and the Chief of the Navy from 1953 to 1961. After retiring from the Navy in 1961, Ericson held court offices in the Royal Court of Sweden. He was First Marshal of the Court from 1962 to 1973 and Marshal of the Realm from 1966 to 1976.

== Early life ==
Ericson was born on 12 July 1897 in Stockholm, Sweden, the son of rear admiral Hans Ericson and his wife Elin (née Gadelius). He passed studentexamen in 1915.

== Career ==
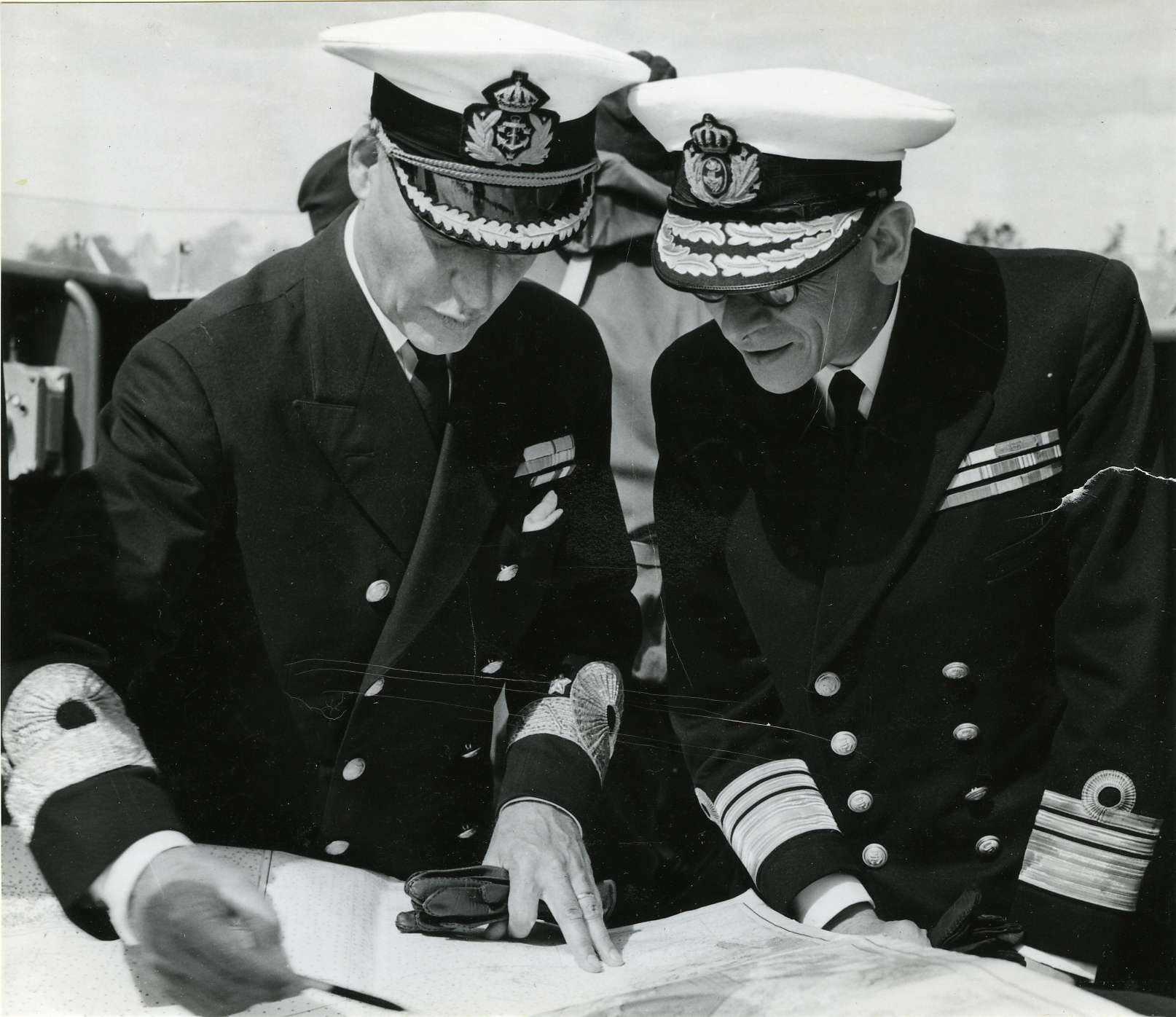
Chief of the Navy, Vice Admiral Ericsson (left) and Chief of Danish Navy Staff, Vice Admiral Hans Alfred Nyholm in 1955.

Ericson was commissioned as a naval officer and acting sub-lieutenant in the Swedish Navy in 1918. Ericson served at the Naval Staff from 1926 to 1932. Ericson was a teacher at the Royal Swedish Naval Staff College from 1928 to 1938 and served as a naval assistant at the Board of Telecommunications Services (Telegrafstyrelsen) from 1929 to 1932.

Ericson completed the staff course at the École Superieure de Guerre Navale in Paris from 1930 to 1931 when he was promoted to lieutenant and was then flag adjutant of the Commander-in-Chief of the Coastal Fleet from 1932 to 1936. He was commanding officer of the 3rd Destroyer Division (3. jagardivisionen) in 1936 and of HSwMS Stockholm from 1937 to 1938. During this time Ericson also served in the Naval Staff from 1936 to 1938 when he was promoted to commander. Ericson was head of Naval Operations Department in the Defence Staff from 1939 to 1942 and captain of the coastal defence ship HSwMS Drottning Victoria from 1942 to 1943 when he was promoted to captain and was appointed chief of staff.

He was appointed flag captain in 1943 and was head of the Weapons Department at the Royal Swedish Naval Materiel Administration from 1944 to 1945 when he was promoted to rear admiral and appointed vice chief there the same year. Ericson left the position in 1950 when he was appointed Commander-in-Chief of the Coastal Fleet which he was until 1953. He was promoted to vice admiral in 1953 when he was appointed Chief of the Navy. The period after the end of the World War II was marked by rapid technological development towards new fire-control systems, missiles and an increasingly powerful aircraft. The different armed services representatives were constantly engaged in a battle of division of the military government funding. For Ericson it was clear early on that the days of the coastal defence ship were over, and in connection with the Defence Act of 1958, he submitted Marinplan 60 ("Naval Plan 60"), which was based on the Swedish Navy being converted to more but smaller ships.

He left the position of Chief of the Navy and retired from the navy in 1961 and was at the same time promoted to full admiral. Ericson had previously served within the Royal Court of Sweden as adjutant of Crown Prince Gustaf Adolf in 1937 and as Chief Adjutant of His Majesty the King Gustaf VI Adolf from 1950 to 1973. After retiring from the navy in 1961, he became the First Marshal of the Court the year after. He served in that position until 1973 and as Marshal of the Realm from 1970 to 1976 (acting 1966 to 1969).

== Other work ==
Ericson was an expert in 1930 and the 1945 Defense Commission, secretary of the 1936 Ship Class Investigation and the investigation into the Coast Guard in 1941. He was a member of the Council of the Factory Board (Fabrikstyrelsens råd) and the Defence Research Council (Försvarets forskningsnämnd) from 1943 to 1945. Ericson was a board member of the Swedish National Defence Research Institute from 1945 to 1950, chairman of the Swedish Board for Computing Machinery from 1948 to 1950, chairman of Vegetebolagen from 1949 to 1957 and vice chairman of the board of the Maritime Museum from 1948 to 1950.

Furthermore, Ericson was chairman of Svenska Dagbladet's Foundation from 1962 to 1967, of the Carnegiestiftelsen from 1967 to 1979 and of the Prins Eugens Waldemarsudde from 1966 to 1976. He was a board member of the AB Marabou from 1951 to 1975, of the AB Turitz & Co from 1958 to 1970 and of the Stockholms Enskilda Bank from 1968 to 1970. Ericson was chairman of the Council for Socioeconomic Issues (Rådet för samhällsekonomiska frågor) from 1970 to 1979.

== Personal life ==
In 1921 he married Barbro Almström (1901–1993), the daughter of factory manager Harald Almström and his wife Agda (née Norinder). He was the father of Barbro "Babs" Gedda (1922–2020).

== Death ==
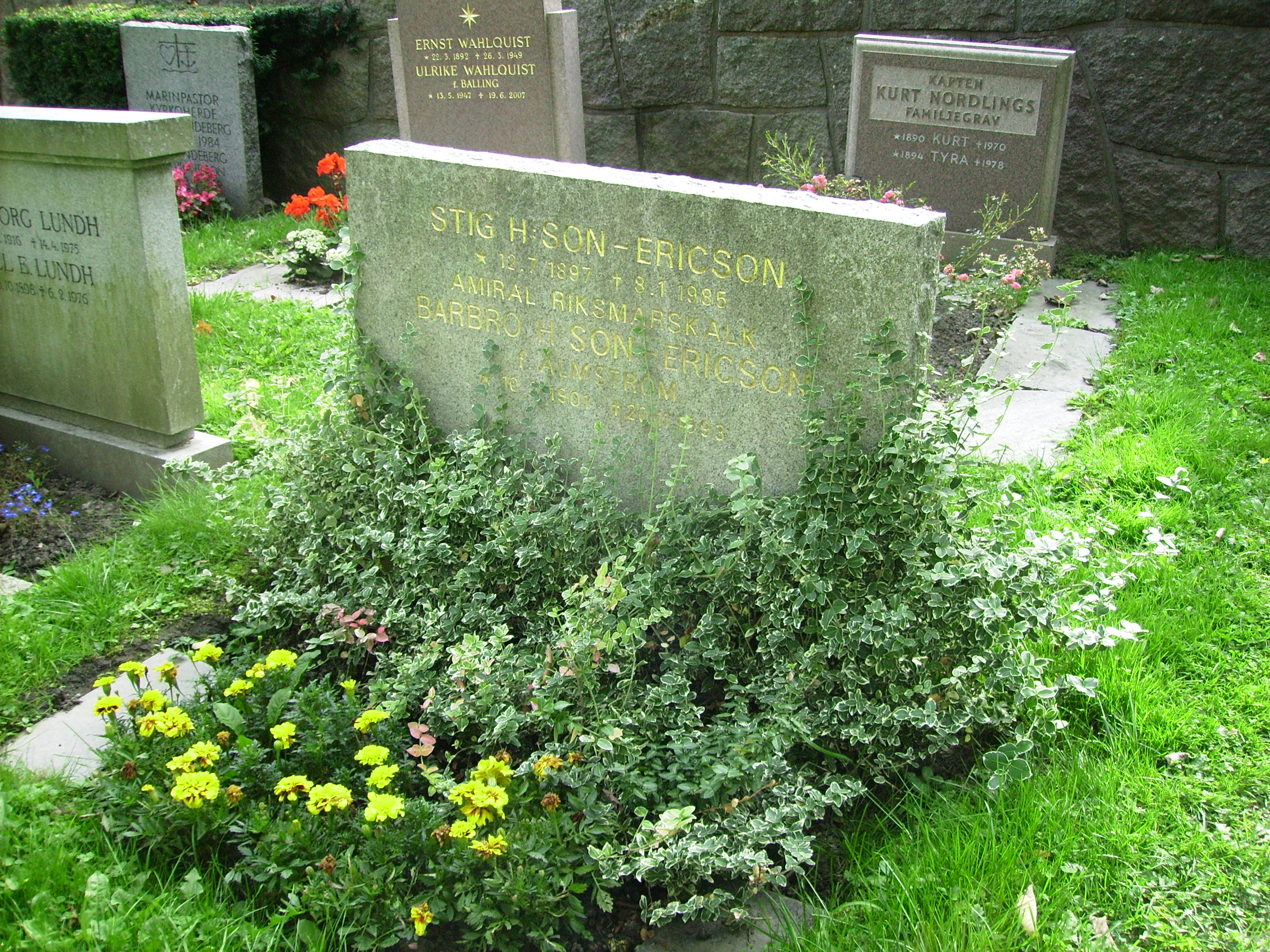
Ericsson's grave at Galärvarvskyrkogården in Stockholm.

Ericsson died on 8 January 1985 in his home in Stockholm. The funeral service was held on 17 January 1985 in the Royal Chapel in Stockholm. At the funeral were King Carl XVI Gustaf and Queen Silvia, Princess Christina with her husband Tord Magnuson and both of Stig H:son Erikson's successors in the office of Marshal of the Realm, Gunnar Lagergren and Sten Rudholm. Prime Minister Olof Palme with his wife Lisbeth Palme, personal physician Gunnar Björck, former Master of Ceremonies Tore Tallroth and Princess Marie Elisabeth of Wied were among the roughly 300 guests at the funeral. Court chaplain Hans Åkerhielm officiated the funeral. Stockholm's boys' choir sang Viktor Rydberg's "Gläns över sjö och strand" and "Ave Maria", and among the hymns were "Härlig är jorden" and, according to Ericson's own wish, hymn 29. On the coffin, draped in the Swedish flag, lay Ericson's admiral's cap and saber while the guard of honor consisted of four admirals. The funeral was framed by Albinoni's "Adagio" and Lindberg's "Gammal fäbodpsalm". Afterwards, a reception was given for 200 people in his home at Slottsbacken. Ericson was interred at Galärvarvskyrkogården in Stockholm.

== Dates of rank ==
- 1918 – Acting sub-lieutenant
- 19?? – Sub-lieutenant
- 1931 – Lieutenant
- 1938 – Commander
- 1943 – Captain
- 1945 – Rear admiral
- 1953 – Vice admiral
- 1961 – Admiral

== Awards and decorations ==
=== Swedish ===
- (Sweden) Knight and Commander of the Orders of His Majesty the King (Order of the Seraphim) (11 November 1972)
- (Sweden) King Gustaf V's Jubilee Commemorative Medal (21 May 1948)
- (Sweden) Commander Grand Cross of the Order of the Sword (11 November 1952)
- (Sweden) Commander 1st Class of the Order of the Sword (6 June 1947)
- (Sweden) Commander 2nd Class of the Order of the Sword (6 June 1946)
- (Sweden) Knight of the Order of the Sword (6 June 1939)
- (Sweden) Riddare av Order of the Polar Star (6 June 1942)
- (Sweden) Commander Grand Cross of the Order of Vasa (6 June 1969)
- (Sweden) Knight of the Order of Vasa (6 June 1935)
- (Sweden) Lingiad Anniversary Medal (Lingiadens jubileumsmedalj)
- (Sweden) Shooting Gold Medal (Skytteguldmedalj)
- (Sweden) Royal Swedish Society of Naval Sciences' Gold Medal

=== Foreign ===
- (United States) Commander of the Legion of Merit (May 1956)
- (Chile) Grand Officer of the Order of Merit (before 1955)
- (Colombia) Grand Officer of the Order of Naval Merit Admiral Padilla (before 1962)
- (Denmark) Commander Grand Cross of the Order of the Dannebrog (before 1955)
- (Denmark) Commander 1st Class of the Order of the Dannebrog (before 1947)
- (Denmark) Knight of the Order of the Dannebrog (before 1940)
- (Finland) 3rd Class of the Order of the Cross of Liberty with swords (before 1942)
- Commander Grand Cross of the Order of the Lion of Finland (before 1955)
- (France) Commander of the Legion of Honour (before 1950)
- (Guatemala) Grand Cross of the Orden del Quetzal (before 1962)
- (Iceland) Grand Cross of the Order of the Falcon (5 May 1971)
- (Italy) 1st Class / Knight Grand Cross of the Order of Merit of the Italian Republic (14 June 1966)
- (Norway) Grand Cross of the Order of St. Olav (1 July 1950)
- (Norway) Knight 1st Class of the Order of St. Olav (before 1940)
- (Norway) Knight 2nd Class of the Order of St. Olav (before 1931)
- (Poland) Officer of the Order of Polonia Restituta (before 1940)
- (Spain) Knight of the Cross of Naval Merit (before 1931)
- (United Kingdom) Honorary Grand Cross of the Royal Victorian Order (June 1956)
- (Nazi Germany) 1st Class of the Order of the German Eagle (before 1945)

== Honours ==
- Member of the Royal Swedish Society of Naval Sciences (1932; honorary member in 1945)
- Member of the Royal Swedish Academy of War Sciences (1942; president 1953-1955)
- Associate honorary member of the United States Naval Institute (1959)

== Bibliography ==
- Ericson, Stig H:son (1934). Trupptransporter till sjöss: en studie i världskrigets belysning. Marinlitteraturföreningen, 0348-2405; 38 (in Swedish). Stockholm: Marinlitteraturföreningen. SELIBR 1348770.
- Ericson, Stig H:son (1935). Försvarskommissionen och flottan: en kritisk granskning av 1930 års försvarskommissions betänkande i vad avser flottan. Föreningen Sveriges flottas småskrifter, 99-3366728-9; 19 (in Swedish). Stockholm: Fritzes. SELIBR 1354444.
- Ericson, Stig Hansson (1939). Försvarsproblem kring Ålandsöarna (in Swedish). Stockholm. SELIBR 2836922.
- Ericson, Stig H:son (1941). Det nutida sjökrigets karaktär. Medborgarkunskap om riksförsvaret, 99-1771683-1; 3 (in Swedish). Stockholm: Riksförb. för Sveriges försvar. SELIBR 1419190.
- Palmstierna, Carl-Fredrik; Ericson, Stig H:son; Gréen, Sven; Liljeroth, Erik, eds. (1965). Boken om Sofiero: ett kungligt sommarresidens vid Sundets strand skildrat i ord och bild till hundraårsjubileet av slottets tillblivelse (in Swedish). Malmö: Allhem. SELIBR 1171090.
- Ericson, Stig H:son (1966). Knopar på logglinan (in Swedish). Stockholm: Bonnier. SELIBR 23079.
- Ericson, Stig H:son (1968). Kuling längs kusten: minnen från åtta år som chef för marinen (in Swedish). Stockholm: Bonnier. SELIBR 23078.
- Ericson, Stig H:son (1976). Vita havet: segling i kungliga farvatten (in Swedish). Stockholm: Bonnier. ISBN 91-0-041170-1. SELIBR 7145078.
- Ericson, Stig H:son (1981). Arleigh Albert Burke: en märklig svenskättad chef för USN 1955-1961 (in Swedish). Stockholm. SELIBR 10589284.

Military offices
Preceded by Helge Strömbäck	Defence Staff's Naval Operations Department; 1939–1942	Succeeded by ?
Preceded by Erik Wetter	Vice Chief of the Royal Swedish Naval Materiel Administration; 1945–1950	Succeeded by Gunnar Jedeur-Palmgren
Preceded by Erik Samuelson	Commander-in-Chief of the Coastal Fleet; 1950–1953	Succeeded by Erik af Klint
Preceded by Helge Strömbäck	Chief of the Navy; 1953–1961	Succeeded by Åke Lindemalm
Professional and academic associations
Preceded by Birger Hedqvist	President of the Royal Swedish Academy of War Sciences; 1953–1955	Succeeded by Axel Ljungdahl
Court offices
Preceded by Erik Wetter	First Marshal of the Court; 1962–1973	Succeeded by Tom Wachtmeister
Preceded by Nils Vult von Steyern	Marshal of the Realm; 1966–1976	Succeeded by Gunnar Lagergren
