= Einar Blidberg =

Swedish Navy officer

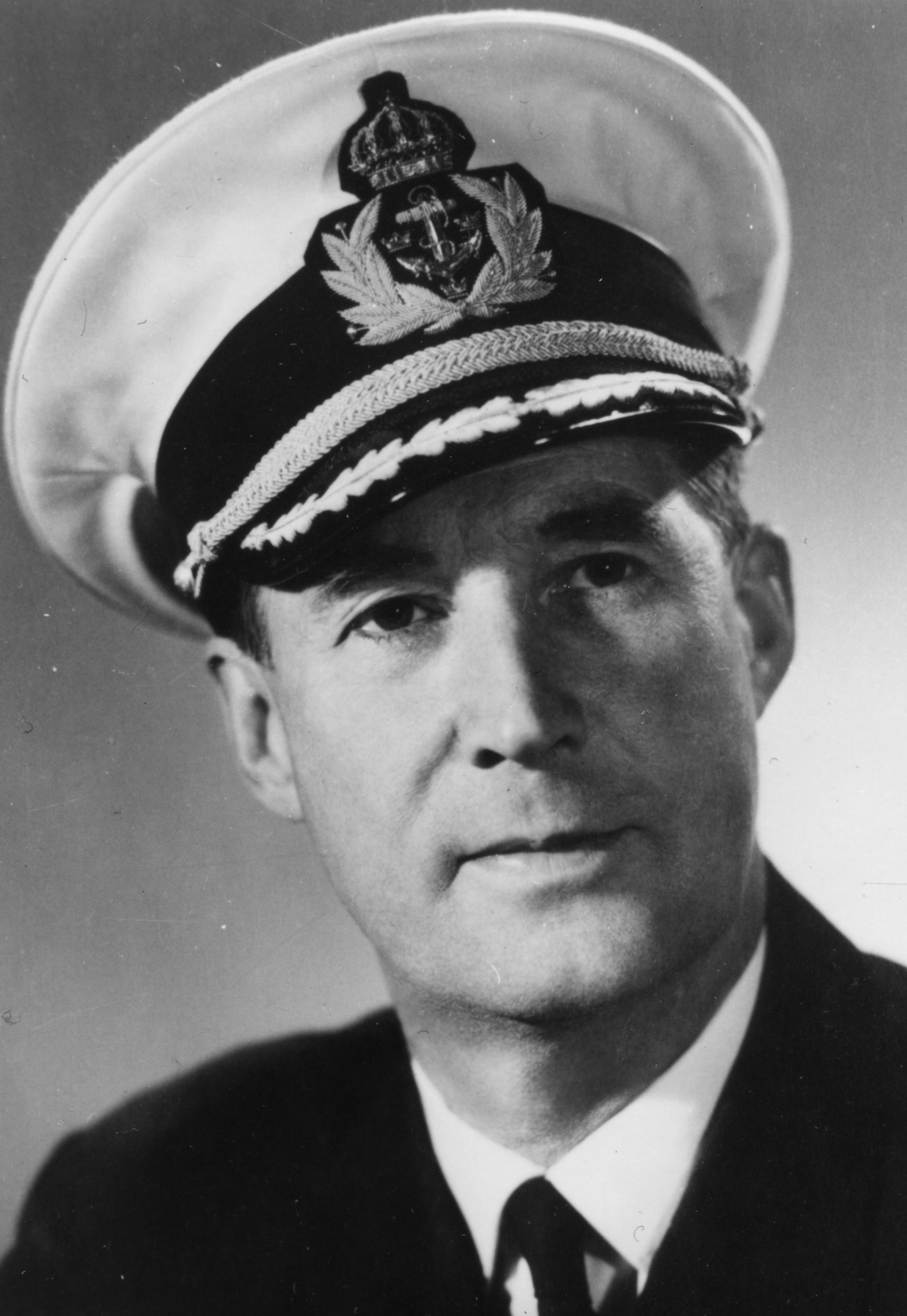
- Blidberg as rear admiral.
- Born: Carl Einar Blidberg; 20 September 1906; Kramfors, Sweden
- Died: 21 March 1993 (aged 86); Stockholm, Sweden
- Burial place: Galärvarvskyrkogården
- Military career
- Allegiance: Sweden
- Branch: Swedish Navy
- Service years: 1928–1971
- Rank: Vice Admiral
- Commands: HSwMS Göta Lejon; Flag captain; Chief of the Naval Staff; Coastal Fleet; Naval Command East; East Coast Naval Base

Vice Admiral Carl Einar Blidberg (20 September 1906 – 21 March 1993) was a Swedish Navy officer. Blidberg served as Chief of the Naval Staff from 1957 to 1961, Commander-in-Chief of the Coastal Fleet from 1962 to 1966, and as commanding officer of the Naval Command East and the East Coast Naval Base from 1966 to 1971.

== Early life ==
Blidberg was born on 20 September 1906 in Kramfors, Sweden, the son of Tage Blidberg and his wife Ragnhild (née Ekelund). In 1923, Blidberg served as an extra cadet on the coastal defence ship HSwMS Drottning Victoria when the Crown Prince Gustaf Adolf went to London for the engagement with Louise Mountbatten, our future queen. After passing studentexamen in Falun in 1925, he was accepted as a sea cadet.

== Career ==
After the then current course of study with practical courses at sea and two winters at the Royal Swedish Naval Academy at Skeppsholmen, Blidberg was commissioned as an officer in the Swedish Navy in 1928 with the rank of acting sub-lieutenant. Blidberg started as an artilleryman on the Sverige-class coastal defence ship and on destroyers. He was promoted to sub-lieutenant in 1930. The culmination of his artillery activities came in 1934, when he, as an artillery officer on destroyers at a maximum firing distance of two and a half minutes without test firing and with an eight-second salvo rate, had a hit rate of 25%. As an artilleryman, he won two Bofors trophies and a King's trophy (Kungapokal).

From 1935 to 1936, Blidberg served as a Deputy Naval Attaché in Paris. He served as commanding officer on destroyers in 1943, 1944 and in 1947. After completing the Royal Swedish Naval Staff College's general and higher course, he came to be used in many important positions and investigations. He was promoted to commander in 1944 and served as a teacher at the Royal Swedish Naval Staff College from 1945 to 1948. Blidberg served as chief of staff of the East Coast Naval District in 1949, head of department in the Defence Staff from 1950 to 1952, and commanded the cruiser HSwMS Göta Lejon in 1952. He was promoted to captain in 1953 and served as flag captain of the Coastal Fleet from 1953 to 1956, and in 1957 he was promoted to rear admiral. He then served as Chief of the Naval Staff from 1957 to 1961 and as Acting Commander-in-Chief of the Coastal Fleet in 1961 and as Commander-in-Chief of the Coastal Fleet from 1962 to 1966.

As a practical sailor with experience from both the large ships and destroyers and with deep knowledge, he strongly influenced the development of tactics. This was especially evident during his time as Commander-in-Chief of the Coastal Fleet. The new operational tactics, which were developed and which primarily aimed at surprising attacks after breaking out of the archipelago and then rapid attacks against a detected enemy force, were based on advanced navigation using radar. An important aid was a so-called navigation disc developed by him. The method was also used during his time as a consultant at the Swedish Maritime Administration for training pilots in navigating tankers in archipelago routes in difficult conditions and in navigating supertankers in waters such as the English Channel.

In 1966, Blidberg became commanding officer of the Naval Command East which the same year became the East Coast Naval Base. As commander of the East Coast Naval Base (and former chief of staff), he had a decisive influence on the navy's relocation to Muskö. At 07:59 on Wednesday morning, 16 July 1969, rear admiral Blidberg, boarded a longboat at Skeppsholmen. The time was deliberately chosen - no swallowtailed naval ensign was hoisted over the Admiralty House. The naval base had regrouped to Muskö after 329 years in central Stockholm. Blidberg retired two years later in 1971 and was promoted to vice admiral.

Blidberg served as chairman of the Swedish Society for Maritime History (Sjöhistoriska samfundet) from 1968 to 1987 and later became an honorary member of the same. After retirement, Blidberg served as a nautical consultant in many at the Swedish Maritime Administration from 1971 to 1983.

== Personal life ==
In 1937, Blidberg married Ingrid Harboe (1915–1993), the daughter of Henrik Harboe and Anna de Verdier. He was the father of Carl-Henrik (born 1938), Ragnhild (born 1939), Eva (born 1941), Irene (born 1945), Einar (born 1948).

== Death ==
Blidberg died on 21 March 1993 in Stockholm. The funeral service was held on 13 April 1993 in Skeppsholmen Church in Stockholm. He was interred at Galärvarvskyrkogården on 30 June 1993.

== Dates of rank ==
- 1928 – Acting sub-lieutenant
- 1930 – Sub-lieutenant
- 1939 – Lieutenant
- 1945 – Lieutenant commander
- 1950 – Commander
- 1953 – Captain
- 1957 – Rear admiral
- 1971 – Vice admiral

== Awards and decorations ==
=== Swedish ===
- (Sweden) Commander Grand Cross of the Order of the Sword (6 June 1968)
- (Sweden) Commander 1st Class of the Order of the Sword (28 November 1959)
- (Sweden) Knight of the Order of Vasa
- (Sweden) Royal Swedish Society of Naval Sciences' Gold Medal
- (Sweden) Royal Swedish Academy of War Sciences's Silver Medal
- (Sweden) Ahlberg Prize (Ahlbergska priset)

=== Foreign ===
- Knight Commander of the Order of the Crown of Thailand (September 1960)
- (Norway) Commander with Star of the Order of St. Olav (1 July 1962)
- Commander of the Order of the Lion of Finland
- Knight of the Order of the White Rose of Finland

== Honours ==
- Member of the Royal Swedish Society of Naval Sciences (1943; also honorary member)
- Member of the Royal Swedish Academy of War Sciences (1956)
- Honorary member of the Swedish Society for Maritime History (Sjöhistoriska samfundet)

== Bibliography ==
- Blidberg, Einar (1984). Nautisk studie angående sovjettankern Tsesis' grundstötning utanför Käringklubb i Södertäljeleden den 26 oktober 1977. Forum navale, 0280-6215; 39 (in Swedish). Stockholm. SELIBR 8913869.

Military offices
| Preceded by Bertil Berthelsson | Flag captain 1953–1956 | Succeeded by Åke Lindemalm |
| Preceded by Bertil Berthelsson | Chief of the Naval Staff; 1957–1961 | Succeeded by Åke Lindemalm |
| Preceded by Bertil Berthelsson | Commander-in-Chief of the Coastal Fleet; 1962–1966 | Succeeded by Dag Arvas |
| Preceded by Erik af Klint | Naval Command East/East Coast Naval Base; 1966–1971 | Succeeded by Lars H:son Lundberg |
Professional and academic associations
| Preceded by Magnus Hammar | Chairman of the Swedish Society for Maritime History; 1968–1987 | Succeeded by Wilhelm Odelberg |
