= Bergelin =

Bergelin is a surname. Notable people with the surname include:

- Anna-Lena Bergelin, Swedeish entertainer
- Christian Bergelin, French politician
- Lennart Bergelin, Swedish tennis player and coach
- Stig Bergelin (1905–1983), Swedish Navy officer
