= Stig Bergelin =

Swedish Navy officer (1905–1983)

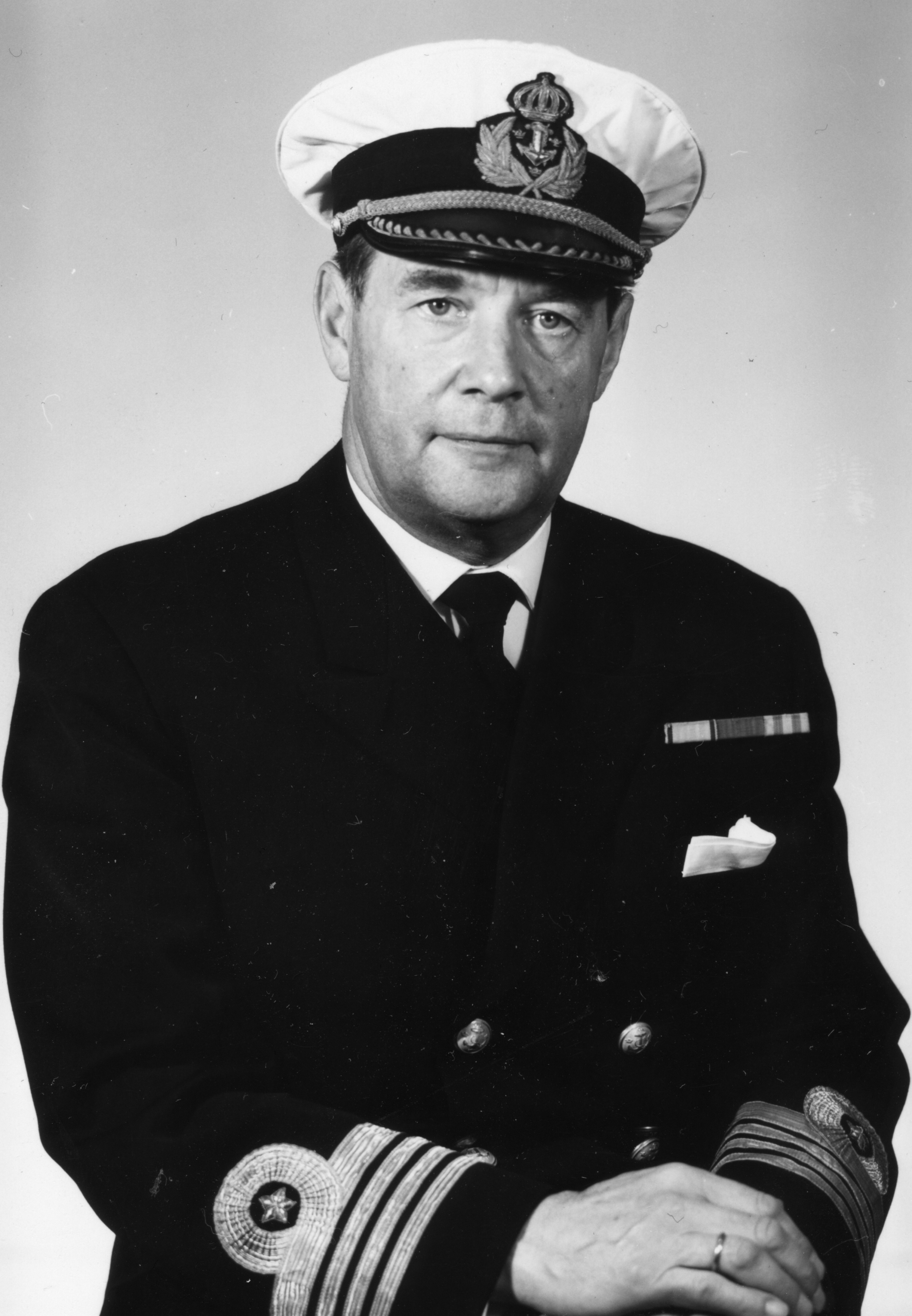
- Bergelin as captain (higher grade), circa 1960
- Born: Stig Olof Bergelin; 20 September 1905; Karlskrona, Sweden
- Died: 5 October 1983 (aged 78); Karlskrona, Sweden
- Cause of death: Stabbing
- Military career
- Branch: Swedish Navy
- Service years: 1927–1966
- Rank: Rear Admiral
- Commands: HSwMS Gävle; HSwMS Tre Kronor; 1st Destroyer Division; 2nd Squadron; Navy Schools at Berga; Karlskrona Naval Yard; Naval Command South

Rear Admiral Stig Olof Bergelin (20 September 1905 – 5 October 1983) was a Swedish Navy officer. Bergelin captained both destroyers and cruisers as well as the 1st Destroyer Division and the 2nd Squadron. He also headed the Navy Schools at Berga from 1956 to 1958, Karlskrona Naval Yard from 1960 to 1961, and served as acting commanding officer of the Naval Command South in Karlskrona from 1963 to 1966. Furthermore, Bergelin was chairman of the Royal Swedish Society of Naval Sciences from 1963 to 1966. He was murdered in central Karlskrona by a mentally ill person in 1983.

== Early life ==
Bergelin was born on 20 September 1905 in Karlskrona, Sweden, the son of 1st naval stores officer (1:e marinintendent) Oscar Bergelin and his wife Sigrid Hallström. He had a sister, Ingegärd. He passed studentexamen in Karlskrona in 1924 and became a cadet the same year.

== Career ==
Bergelin was commissioned as a naval officer in 1927 with the rank of acting sub-lieutenant. He was promoted to sub-lieutenant in 1930. Bergelin attended the general course at the Royal Swedish Naval Staff College from 1934 to 1935, after which he chose a higher nautical course. This led to a multi-year service in the Nautical Department of the Royal Swedish Naval Materiel Administration, combined with service as a teacher of navigation at the Royal Swedish Naval Academy and - in summer - as navigation officer on the seaplane cruiser HSwMS Gotland, also flag adjutant at the Naval Academy Department. In all, during his career as a naval officer, he served more than 15 years at sea, except for six months in 1936–1937 in civilian shipping company under temporary employment in Rederi AB Transatlantic. Bergelin was promoted to lieutenant in 1939.

Under World War II, Bergelin served as a teacher of navigation at the Royal Swedish Naval Staff College from 1941 and captain of the destroyer HSwMS Gävle from 1942 to 1944, when he was promoted to lieutenant commander. After the destroyer service in 1944, Bergelin transferred from the technical service to staff service with placement in the Naval Staff's Organizational Department. At the same time, he was a teacher in navigation at the Royal Swedish Naval Staff College's higher courses and in naval warfare at the Royal Swedish Air Force Staff College. His solid knowledge was used in several major investigations. As an assistant at the Nautical Department, he participated in the 1941 Defence Investigation and after the war he was included as an expert in the 1945 Defence Committee. He was also in 1948–1950 a member of the navy's regulations committee.

After the war Bergelin first became executive officer and then captain of the cruiser HSwMS Tre Kronor in 1948. He was promoted to commander in 1949. The position as commander of the 1st Destroyer Division (1. jagardivisionen) in the Coastal Fleet was held by Bergelin from 1950 to 1951. He then served as head of the Naval Staff's Organizational Department from 1951 to 1953 and from 1953 to 1954 he served as chief inspector in the National Board of Trade. In 1955, at the age of 49, he was appointed captain in the navy. In the same year, he served as commander of the 2nd Squadron (Andra eskadern). On 16 April 1956, he took over as head of the Navy Schools at Berga. At Berga he received a visit from Prince Philip, Duke of Edinburgh in June 1956. Bergelin attended the Swedish National Defence College in 1957 and for the next two years, he served as head of Section 2 in the Naval Staff. In 1959, Bergelin returned to his hometown and to the technical-administrative position as head of the Karlskrona Naval Yard (Karlskrona örlogsvarv), where his authority and organizational skills were, among other things, an asset during the thorough reorganization of the administrative service and the creation of a civilian shipyard.

Bergelin was at the disposal of the commander of the Naval Command South, Rear Admiral Bertil Berthelsson from 1961 to 1963. In 1963 he was appointed rear admiral in the navy and acting commander of the Naval Command South and that position - as "Karlskrona's last admiral" - he held until his retirement three years later. For 300 years there had been at least one admiral as head of Karlskrona. From the beginning of October 1966, the 43rd and last admiral, Stig Bergelin, retired. He was succeeded as head of the South Coast Naval Base by Captain Hans Gottfridsson. After leaving active duty, he quite logically ended his career as the first chief executive officer of AB Karlskronavarvet from 1967 to 1969.

== Personal life ==
In 1931, Bergelin married Eva von Otter (1905–1902), the daughter of Baron Fredrik von Otter and Elsa Wrede. They had gotten engaged the year before. On 9 June 1959, he married Marianne von Otter (née Nyqvist; born 1922), the daughter of colonel Gustaf Nyqvist and Zelma (née Håkanson). He was the father of Magnus (1933–2006), Agneta (1936–2001), Olof (born 1940) and Christina (born 1940).

Bergelin lived in Nättraby outside Karlskrona.

== Death ==
Bergelin was sitting with his wife in his car outside the city library at Stortorget in Karlskrona at half past four on 5 October 1983 when a man tore open the car door and stabbed him with a knife. The man tried to open one of the car doors. It was locked. He ran around the car and tore open the other door. There he pulled a knife, which he aimed at Bergelin with several stabs. When Bergelin collapsed, the man surrendered to Bergelin's wife. She was stabbed four times in the neck and cheeks before a witness managed to disarm the perpetrator. A few minutes later, both Bergelin and his wife were taken to the hospital. There, the doctors could confirm that Bergelin was dead. The wife received minor injuries. During questioning, it emerged that it was pure coincidence that it was Bergelin who was stabbed. The man and the Bergelin's had never been in contact with each other before. The man had been armed with two knives to protect himself. He had felt persecuted. About an hour before the crime, the man had agreed with a doctor at Gullberna Mental Hospital that he would be allowed to come there for treatment. The man had rejected the offer of a ride to the hospital. He wanted to get there on his own, which ended up with him going to central Karlskrona, where the crime was committed.

On 9 November 1983, the Karlskrona District Court sentenced a 46-year-old resident of Karlskrona to closed psychiatric care for aggravated assault and involuntary manslaughter.

== Dates of rank ==
- 1927 – Acting sub-lieutenant
- 1930 – Sub-lieutenant
- 1939 – Lieutenant
- 1944 – Lieutenant commander
- 1949 – Commander
- 1955 – Captain
- 1963 – Rear admiral

== Awards and decorations ==
- (Sweden) Commander 1st Class of the Order of the Sword (6 June 1962)
- (Sweden) Knight of the Order of the Sword (1946)
- (Sweden) Knight of the Order of Vasa (1948)
- (Sweden) Swedish Auxiliary Naval Corps' Gold Medal
- (Sweden) Swedish Women's Voluntary Defence Organization Medal of Merit in silver
- (Sweden) Swedish Guide and Scout Association's Badge of Honor "Förbundsliljan" (January 1962)
- (Sweden) South Coast Naval Base's Gold Shield (1969)

== Honours ==
- Member of the Royal Swedish Society of Naval Sciences (1943)
- Honorary member of the Royal Swedish Society of Naval Sciences (1963)
- Grandmaster of the Order of Amarante
- Chairman of the board of Marinmuseum
- Inspector Emeriti of the SjöLund naval academy association
- Chairman of the interim board of the Stiftelsen Harald af Cristiernins invalidinrättning ("Harald af Cristiernin Foundation for Invalids") (until 1 Oktober 1974)

== Bibliography ==
- Ulff, Sven; Hilding, Folke; Bergelin, Stig (1945). Lärobok i navigation för flottans undervisningsanstalter och navigationsskolorna (in Swedish). Stockholm: Norstedt. SELIBR 8219922.
- Ulff, Sven Gustaf Carlsson; Bergelin, Stig; Hilding, Gustaf Folke (1951). Ändringar och tillägg till Lärobok i navigation 1945 föranledda av ändrad uppställning av Nautikalalmanackan 1952: [Illustr.] (in Swedish). Stockholm. SELIBR 3145123.

Military offices
Preceded by Evert Lindh	Karlskrona Naval Yard; 1960–1961	Succeeded by None
Preceded by Bertil Berthelsson	Naval Command South; 1963–1966	Succeeded by Hans Gottfridsson
Professional and academic associations
Preceded by Bertil Berthelsson	Chairman of the Royal Swedish Society of Naval Sciences; 1963–1966	Succeeded by Dag Arvas
