= Flag captain (Sweden) =

Military appointment

Flag captain (Swedish: flaggkapten) was in the Swedish Navy a captain or commander who served as deputy to a fleet commander. During the 1900s, the flag captain served as chief of staff of Flaggen, the staff of the Chief of the Coastal Fleet.

== History ==
A flag captain was a naval officer in the Swedish Navy holding the rank of captain or commander, appointed as the chief of staff to the 'highest commanding officer.' If he was a flag officer, the flag captain would carry the flag, designated as the command sign, with the standard prescribed for the 'squadron commander'; otherwise, they would carry the broad pennant (galjadett) designated for the 'department commander'. According to regulations in force before 1875, a flag captain was an officer of the rank of flag officer or regimental officer, assigned to assist the commander of a fleet consisting of at least six ships of the line, frigates, or battalion of archipelago ships.

Between 1904 and 2000, the flag captain served as chief of staff of Flaggen, the staff of the Chief of the Coastal Fleet.

== Flag captains (1902–2000) ==
- 1902–1903: Lieutenant commander Sten Ankarcrona
- 1904–1907: Commander Herman Wrangel
- 1907–1907: Captain Carl August Ehrensvärd
- 1907–1909: Commander Gustaf af Klint
- 1909–1915: Commander Henning von Krusenstierna
- 1914–1915: Lieutenant commander Ulf Carl Knutsson Sparre (acting)
- 1915–1918: Captain Carl Alarik Wachtmeister
- 1918–1919: Lieutenant commander Henrik Gisiko
- 1920–1923: Captain Gustaf Starck
- 1923–1925: Captain Charles de Champs
- 1925–1930: Captain Claës Lindsström
- 1930–1931: Captain Fabian Tamm
- 1932–1933: Captain Hans Simonsson
- 1933–1936: Captain Gösta Ehrensvärd
- 1937–1939: Captain Yngve Ekstrand
- 1939–1941: Captain Helge Strömbäck
- 1941–1943: Captain Erik Anderberg
- 1943–1945: Captain Erik Samuelson
- 1946–1948: Captain John Wirström
- 1948–1950: –
- 1950–1951: Captain Erik af Klint
- 1951–1953: Captain Bertil Berthelsson
- 1953–1956: Captain Einar Blidberg
- 1957–1959: Captain Åke Lindemalm
- 1959–1964: Captain Magnus Starck
- 1964–1966: Captain Nils-Erik Ödman
- 1966–1971: Captain Alf Berggren
- 1971–1973: Captain Göte Blom
- 1973–1973: Commander Sigurd Håkansson
- 1973–1978: Captain Åke Johnson
- 1978–1980: Captain Lennart Forsman
- 1980–1980: Captain Bengt O'Konor
- 1980–1982: Captain Holger Grenstad
- 1982–1983: Captain Johan Bring
- 1983–1985: Captain Claes Tornberg
- 1985–1986: Captain Gustaf Taube
- 1986–1988: Captain Bengt Uggla
- 1988–1989: Captain Frank Rosenius
- 1989–1992: Captain Emil Svensson
- 1992–1994: Captain Christer Hägg
- 1994–1996: Captain Olof Jonsson
- 1996–1998: Captain Anders Stävberg
