= Naval Staff (Sweden) =

Military unit

- Marinstaben
- Coat of arms of the Swedish Naval Staff.
- Active: 1907–1994, 2019–present
- Country: Sweden
- Allegiance: Swedish Armed Forces
- Branch: Swedish Navy
- Type: Staff
- Role: Operational, territorial and tactical operations
- Garrison/HQ: Muskö
- March: "Flottans paradmarsch" (Wagner)

Commanders
- Chief of Staff: Capt (N) Håkan Nilsson

Naval Staff (Swedish: Marinstaben, MS) is the staff of the Chief of the Swedish Navy. Established in 1907, it originated from the Fleet Staff which was established in 1896. The Naval Staff's duties included, among other things to assist the Chief of the Navy with leadership of the Navy's mobilization, training, tactics, organization, equipment and personnel to the extent that such activity was not directly related to operational activities, which was handled by the Defence Staff. In 1994, the Swedish Armed Forces Headquarters took over the Naval Staff's duties. The Naval Staff was reestablished in 2019.

== History ==
=== 1884–1935 ===
The Naval Staff originated from 1884 when it was decided in renewed regulations for the Swedish Navy that the head of the Ministry for Naval Affairs in purely military matters would be assisted by the Chief of the Fleet Staff. The Fleet Staff was organized by a royal proclamation on 29 May 1896. The staff consisted of a Chief and the officers commanded to serve in the staff. Since the Swedish Coastal Artillery was established in 1902 and incorporated into the Swedish Fleet (Svenska flottan) and both some time later received collectively the name Swedish Navy (Svenska marinen), its name was changed by a royal proclamation on 31 December 1907 to the Naval Staff (Marinstaben).

Initially the Naval Staff's main task was to draw up plans for the Navy's mobilization and its use during war and proposals for improvements with regard to its staff, its training and exercises. The operations of the staff was initially divided into three departments, Mobilization and Statistics Department, the Communications Department and the Organization Department. The Chief was to the King in Council a responsible flag officer or captain, and had as its main obligation to, after consultation with the Inspector of Naval Exercises at Sea, to draw up proposals for instructions for naval commanders at sea; to examine incoming and annual general reports; to give suggestions for code of statutes, regulations and instructions for the fleet, which were not of an economic nature, proposals for duty time for the navy conscripts and fleet exercises and more.

A few years later, the work of the Naval Staff were divided into four department, each with a regimental officer of the fleet as a head: the Mobilization Department, which drew up a large part of the plans for naval mobilization, dealing with matters relating to coastal artillery and conscription and more; Communications Department, which handle matters relating to the use of naval forces in wartime, the signal system, tactics and monitoring service, the Maritime Pilots Administration, military trails, waterways, canals and more; Organization Department, which prepared proposals for the improvement of the naval organization, plans for the annual fleet exercises, proposed code of statues and regulations and more; and the Foreign Department, which collected intelligence on naval warfare in foreign countries, conducted historical research on naval warfare and cared for the staff's library. In addition to the Chief and department heads, there were about 20 officers from the Navy and the Coastal Artillery commanded to serve in the Naval Staff at some time or until further notice.

=== 1936–1994 ===
When the Chief of the Navy post was established in 1936 the Naval Staff was transformed into the Chief of the Navy Staff. Until 1961 an Operations Department was part of the Naval Staff. From June 1964 the Naval Staff consisted of a Planning Department, four sections, a Finance Department and a Head’s Office. In the Planning Department there was a provisionally established Budget Unit. In March 1976, the Naval Staff had about 320 employees. The Naval Staff was in connection with the Swedish Armed Forces restructuring on 1 July 1994 amalgamated with the Swedish Armed Forces Headquarters as the Naval Command.

=== 2019–present ===
In February 2018, the Swedish Armed Forces proposed in its budget for 2019 to the Government a reorganization of the Swedish Armed Forces' leadership. The proposal was, among other things, designed with a new management and new organizational units in new locations. This to provide better conditions for a robust and sustainable management. The new organizational units that the Swedish Armed Forces wished to form were proposed to be called the Army Staff, the Air Staff and Naval Staff. These would be formed by a amalgamation of the Training & Procurement Staff and the Joint Forces Command, as well as other complementary parts from, among other things, the Swedish Armed Forces Headquarters and the Defence Materiel Administration. The staffs were proposed to be formed on 1 January 2019 and commanded by an army chief, a naval chief and an air force chief. On 22 November 2018, the Government proposed to the Riksdag to set up organizational units in the form of an Army Staff, a Naval Staff and an Air Staff. The Riksdag authorised the Government to do so by adopting its bill on 18 December 2018. On 20 December 2018, the government decided to form the Naval Staff as a separate organizational unit and place it at Muskö Naval Base in Haninge Municipality. On 30 September 2019, the day the Muskö naval base was inaugurated in 1969, the Naval Staff was inaugurated at the naval base, through a ceremony in the so-called Risdalsslipen on the base.

== Location ==
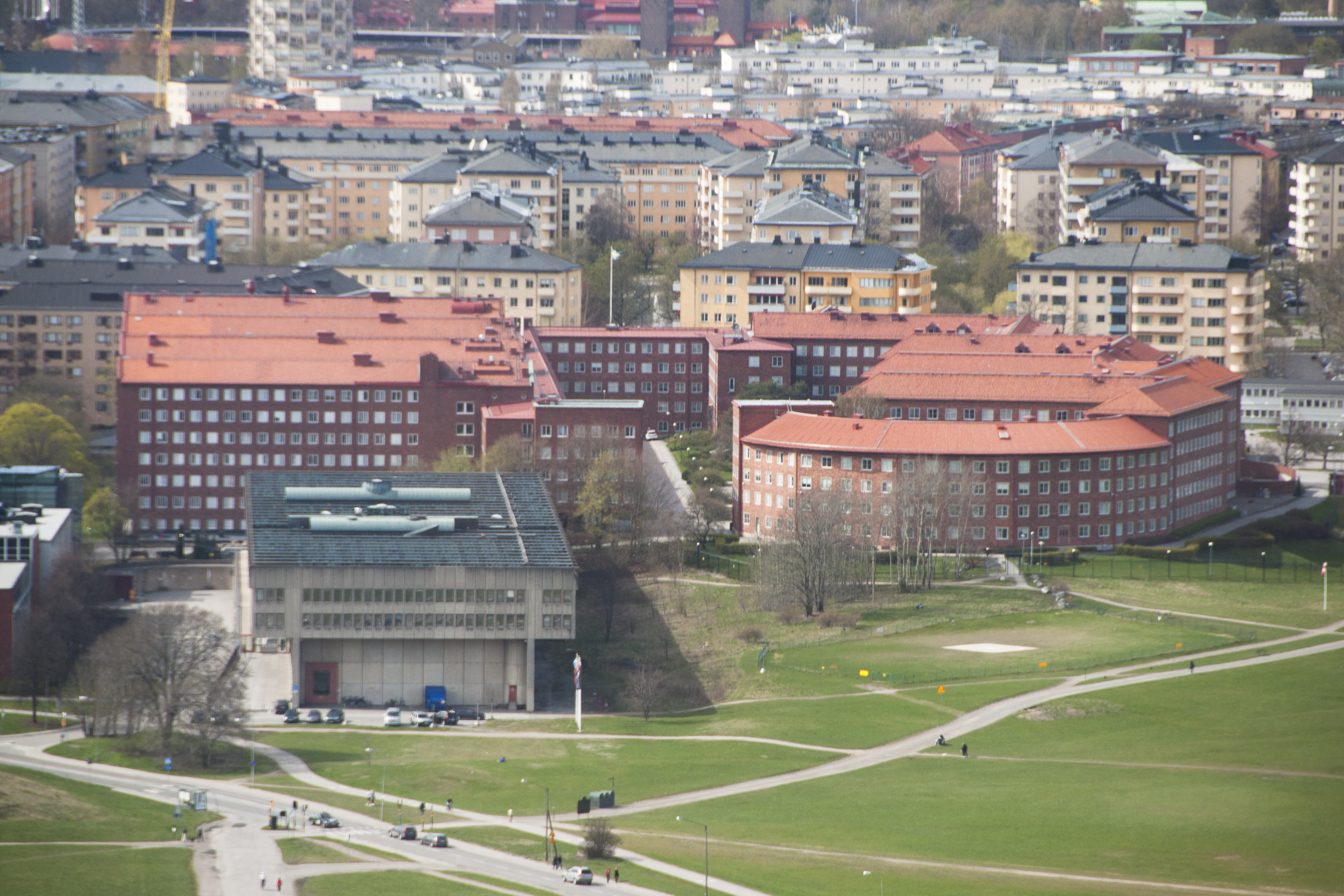
The main part of the Naval Staff was located in these red buildings at Banérgatan 62-64 from 1943 to 1981.

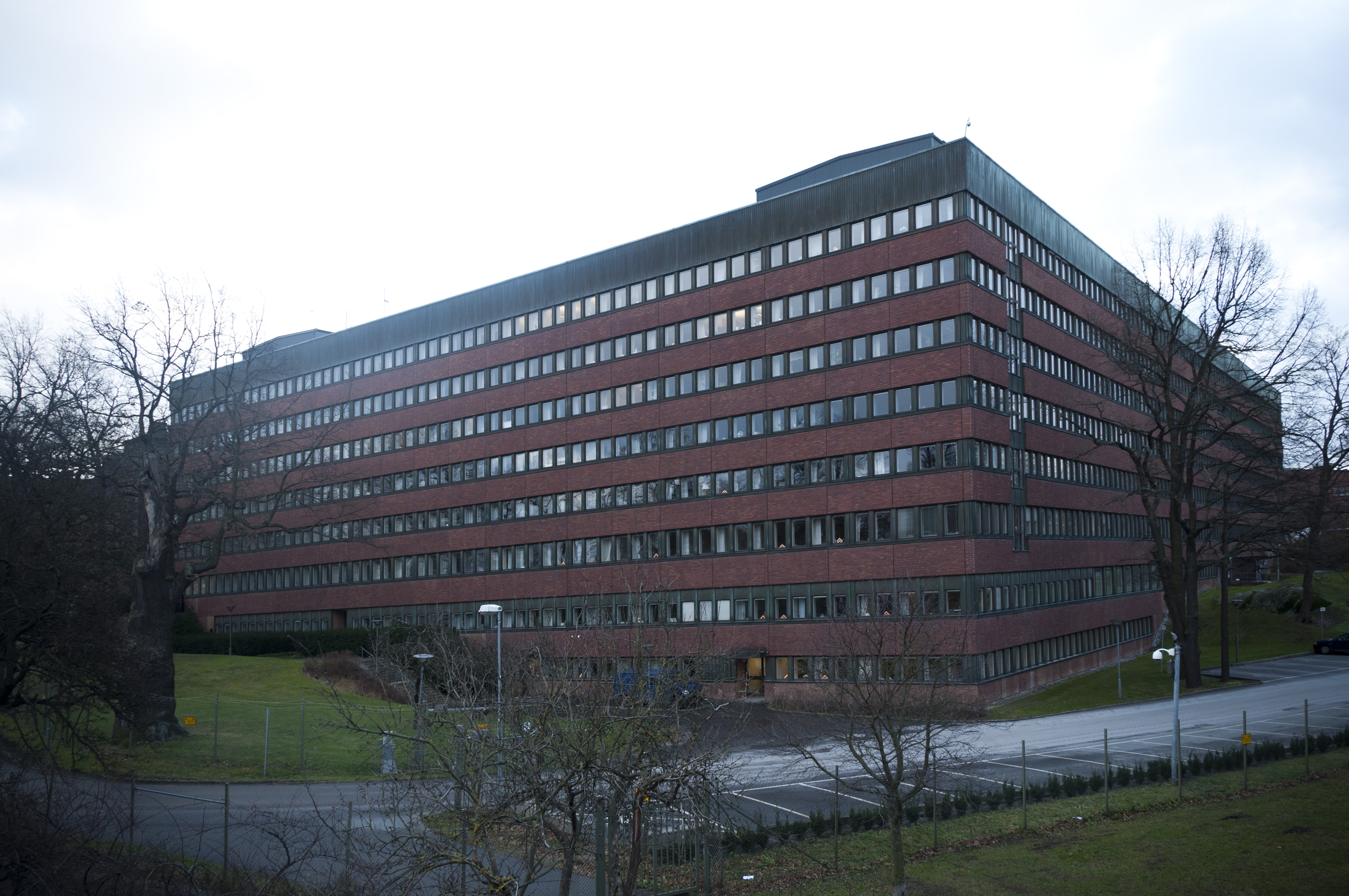
It was located at Lidingövägen 24 from 1981 to 1994.

The Naval Staff was until 1942 located at Birger Jarlsgatan 7 in Stockholm. The main part of the Naval Staff was from 1943 to 1981 located in the building Tre Vapen at Banérgatan 62-64 and at seven other places in the Stockholm area. In 1981 it moved to the building Bastionen at Lidingövägen 24 in Stockholm.

== Heraldry and traditions ==
=== Coat of arms ===
The coat of the arms of the Naval Staff (MS) 1979–1994. It was later used by the Naval Command (ML) 1994–1997, the Naval Tactical Center (MTAC) 1997–1998, the Naval Center (MarinC) 1998–2000, the Naval Tactical Command (MTK) 2000–2007 and the Maritime Component Command since 2007. Blazon: "Azure, an anchor erect cabled, surmounted two gunbarrels old pattern in saltire, all in or".

== Commanding officers ==
=== Chiefs of the Naval Staff ===
- 1907–1911: Theodor Carl Adam Sandström
- 1911–1913: Sten Ankarcrona
- 1913–1916: Ludvig Sidner
- 1916–1927: Henning von Krusenstierna
- 1927–1936: Otto Lybeck
- 1936–1936: Claës Lindsström
- 1936–1937: Charles de Champs
- 1937–1939: Gösta Ehrensvärd
- 1939–1942: Yngve Ekstrand
- 1942–1945: Helge Strömbäck
- 1945–1950: Erik Anderberg
- 1950–1953: Ragnar Wetterblad
- 1953–1957: Bertil Berthelsson
- 1957–1961: Einar Blidberg
- 1960–1961: Åke Lindemalm (acting)
- 1961–1961: Oscar Krokstedt (acting)
- 1962–1964: Oscar Krokstedt
- 1964–1968: Henrik Lange
- 1968–1970: Bo Westin
- 1970–1972: Gunnar Eklund
- 1972–1984: Bo Varenius
- 1984–1987: Torsten Engberg
- 1987–1994: Lars G. Persson
- 2019–2019: Håkan Magnusson
- 2019–2022: Fredrik Palmquist
- 2022–20xx: Håkan Nilsson

=== Vice Chiefs of the Naval Staff ===
- 1941–1945: Ragnar Smith
- 1945–1954: Waldemar Wesström

== Names, designations and locations ==
Names	Translation	From		To
Marinstaben	Naval Staff	1908-07-01	–	1994-06-30
Marinstaben	Naval Staff	2019-01-01	–	
Designations		From		To
MS		1908-07-01	–	1994-06-30
MS		2019-01-01	–	
Location		From		To
Stockholm Garrison		1908-07-01	–	1994-06-30
Stockholm Garrison		2019-01-01	–	2019-05-30
Haninge Garrison/Muskö Naval Base		2019-06-01	–	
