= Kommendörkapten =

Rank in the Swedish Navy

Commander Kommendörkapten
- Pennant of the commander, Swedish Navy.

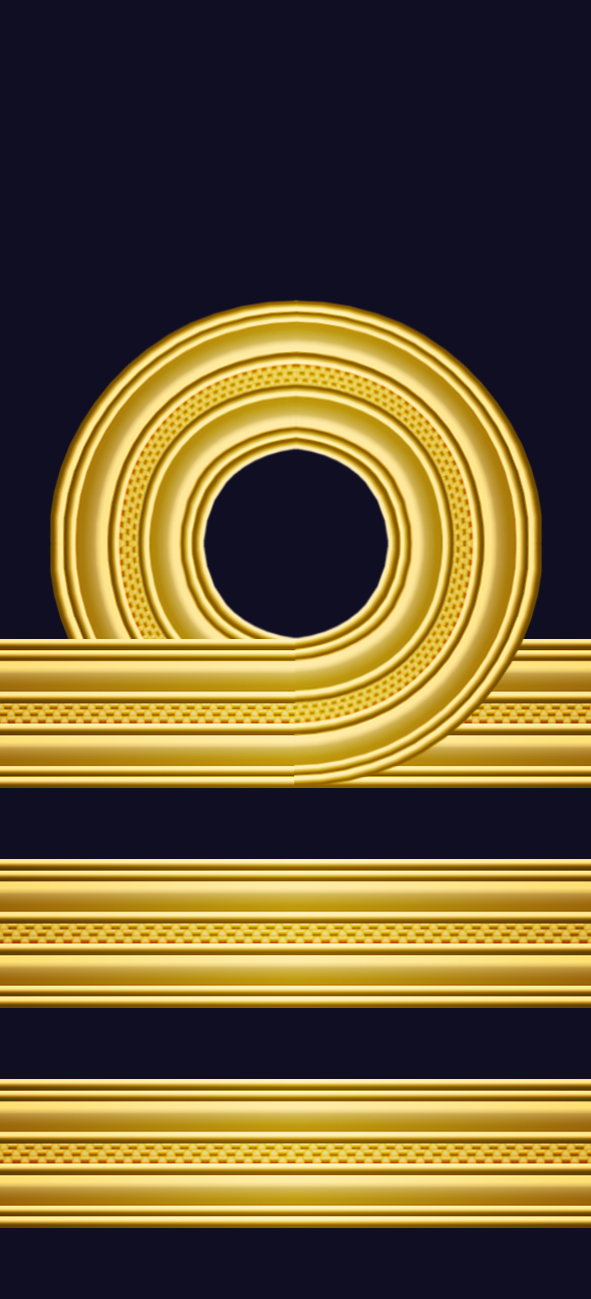
- Shoulder mark of a Swedish commander.

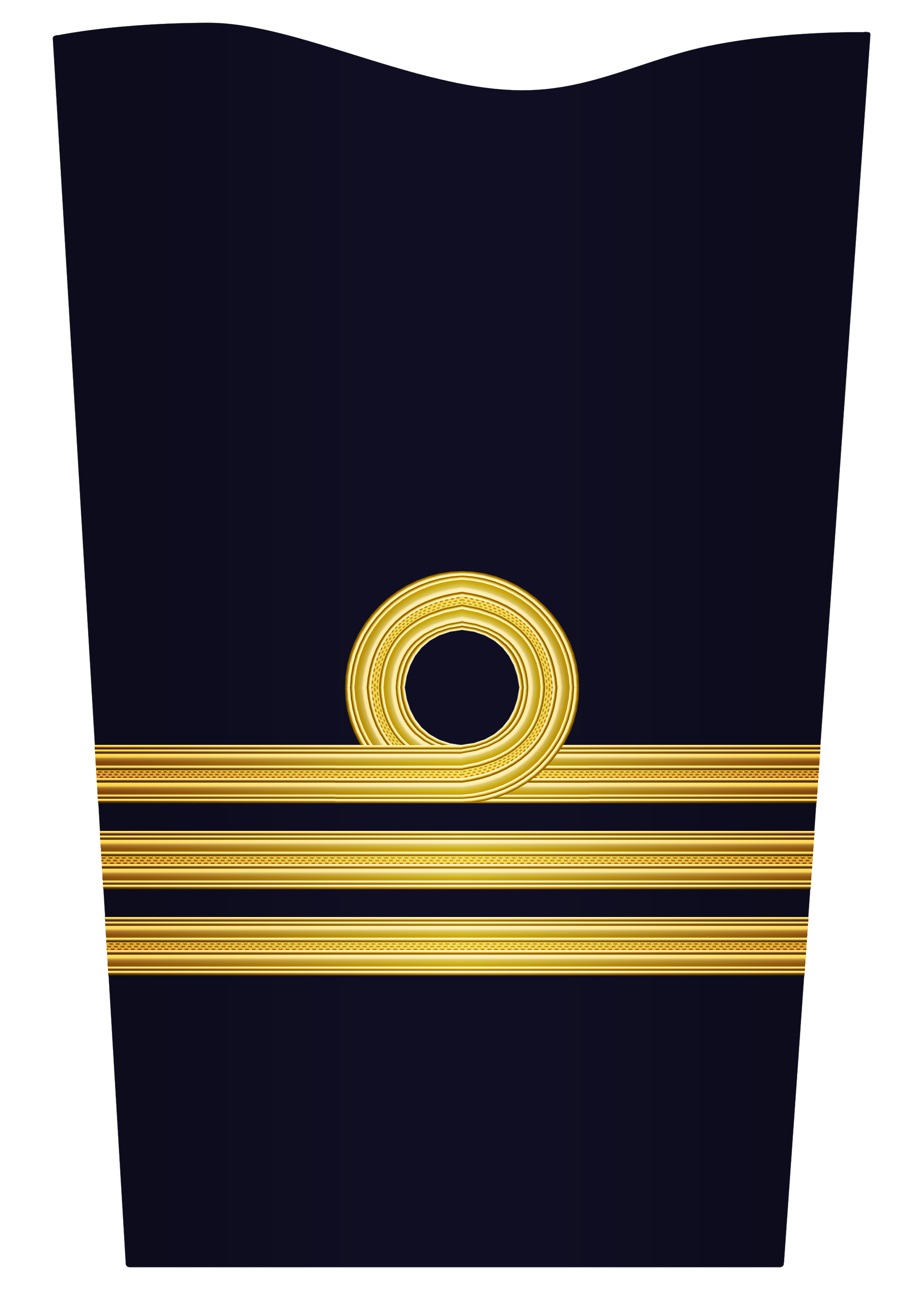
- Sleeve insignia of a Swedish commander.
- Country: Sweden
- Service branch: Swedish Navy
- Abbreviation: Kk (Swedish), Cdr (English)
- Rank: Commander
- NATO rank code: OF-04
- Non-NATO rank: O-5
- Formation: 1747
- Next higher rank: Captain
- Next lower rank: Lieutenant commander
- Equivalent ranks: Lieutenant colonel

Commander (Cdr) (Swedish: Kommendörkapten, Kk) is a senior-grade officer rank in the Swedish Navy, ranking below captain and above lieutenant commander. The rank is equivalent to lieutenant colonel in the Swedish Army, Swedish Air Force and the Swedish Amphibious Corps. Before 1972, the rank of commander was divided into two ranks: commander (kommendörkapten av 1:a graden/klassen) and lieutenant commander (kommendörkapten av 2:a graden/klassen).

== History ==
Commander has been used as a rank from 1747 to 1771. Commanders of the Swedish Navy were divided into two ranks: commander (kommendörkapten av 1:a klass, lit. 'commander of the 1st class') and lieutenant commander (Note: Since 1972, a lieutenant commander is a örlogskapten in the Swedish Navy.) (kommendörkapten av 2:a klassen, lit. 'commander of 2nd class'). The first rank corresponded to a lieutenant colonel and the second to a major in the Swedish Army. From 1771 the whole rank was called lieutenant colonel also in the navy, but from 1824 lieutenant commander (kommendörkapten av 2:a klassen). In 1845 the division of classes disappeared, and the rank became only commander until 1866, when the rank was again divided into two classes. Thereafter, the klass (lit. 'class') has been replaced by the grad (lit. 'rank'). The service for both ranks is the same in the Swedish Navy.

Historically, a commander serves on board as commander of larger vessels and as department chief, division commander (destroyer division), flotilla commander and as flag captain. On land he served as head of department in the Royal Swedish Naval Materiel Administration and in the Naval Staff, as corps commander, head of the Royal Swedish Naval Staff College, the Royal Swedish Naval Academy, exercise and non-commissioned officer schools and the shipyard, chief of staff, conscript commander, adjutant to a station commander etc. According to the state for 1911 there were 17 kommendörkapten av 1:a graden and 18 of the kommendörkapten av 2:a graden.

In 1972, the division of the 1st and 2nd rank ceased and the two ranks became just commander. Since 1972, a lieutenant commander is a örlogskapten in the Swedish Navy.

On 1 July 2003, the Swedish Navy received new rank insignias. The new rank insignia system was inspired from Royal Navy. The idea was that the British system was more internationally viable and thus would facilitate contact between officers. However, this drew some criticism as a commander with four galloons now got three galloons, which in the old rank insignia system was the rank insignia for lieutenant.

== Promotion ==
Promotion of the lieutenant commander to commander may take place when the lieutenant commander has completed the applicable promotion training with approved results. Promotion to positions higher than commander may take place after placement for the time being in a position at a higher position level than that which corresponds to the individual's current rank. Responsible head of promotion to commander is the Director of Human Resource at the Swedish Armed Forces Headquarters or the commander of the Special Forces Command.

== Uniform ==
=== Shoulder mark ===
The top galloon is shaped like a "loop" for an officer in the Swedish Navy (the loop is shaped like a "grenade" for an officer in the Swedish Amphibious Corps). The rank insignia is worn on the shoulder mark to jacket and coat (jacka m/87, kappa m/87), as well as to blue wool sweater (blå ylletröja m/87), trench coat (trenchcoat m/84), sea coat (sjörock 93, black raincoat and to white shirt (vit skjorta m/78). Rank insignia on shoulder mark (axelklaffshylsa 02B) is worn on all garments with shoulder straps.

1. The shoulder mark (Axelklaffshylsa m/02B) is designed as galloons sewn directly to another shoulder mark (axelklaffshylsa m/87 blå). Since 2003 it consists of three gold galloons. Before 2003, this type of shoulder mark with three galloons was worn by a lieutenant.

2. Before 2003, commanders wore four gold galloons. Since 2003, this shoulder mark is used by a captain.

3. The woven shoulder mark (AXELKLAFFSHYLSA M/02 INVÄVD KOMMENDÖR FLOTTAN) is worn on the naval combat dress (sjöstridsdräkt m/93), duty uniform (arbetsdräkt m/87 (blå)) and combat uniform (Fältuniform m/90 lätt, m/90 lätt blå, m/90 tropik (green, beige and blue)).

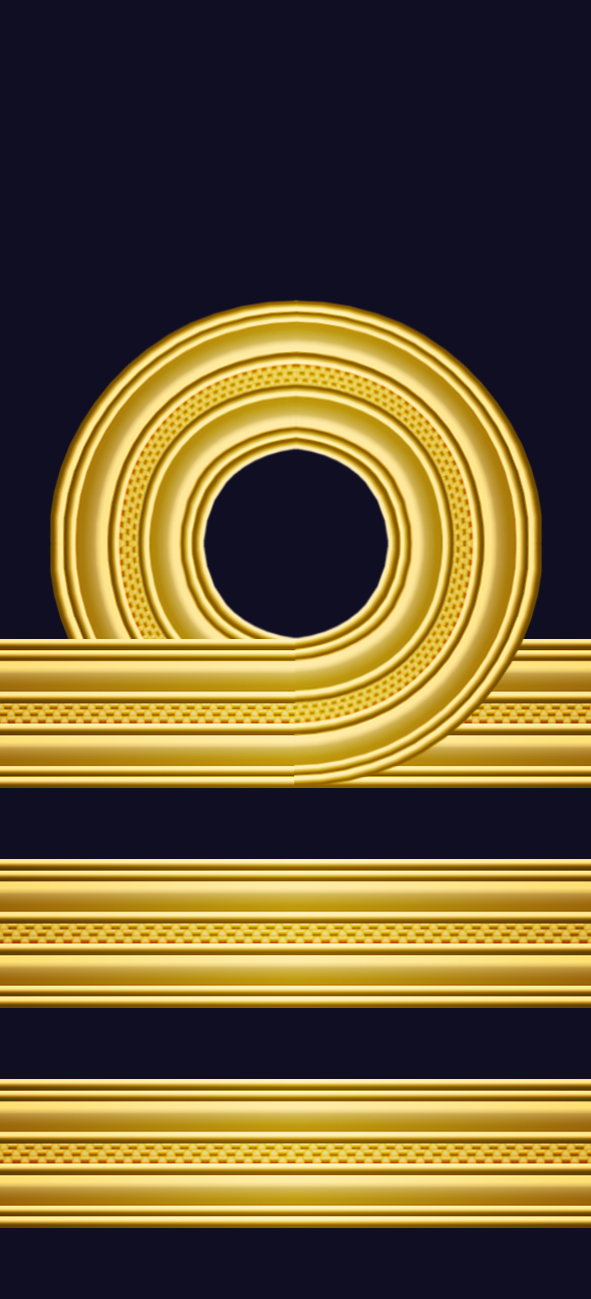
1. Embroidered shoulder mark (2003–present)

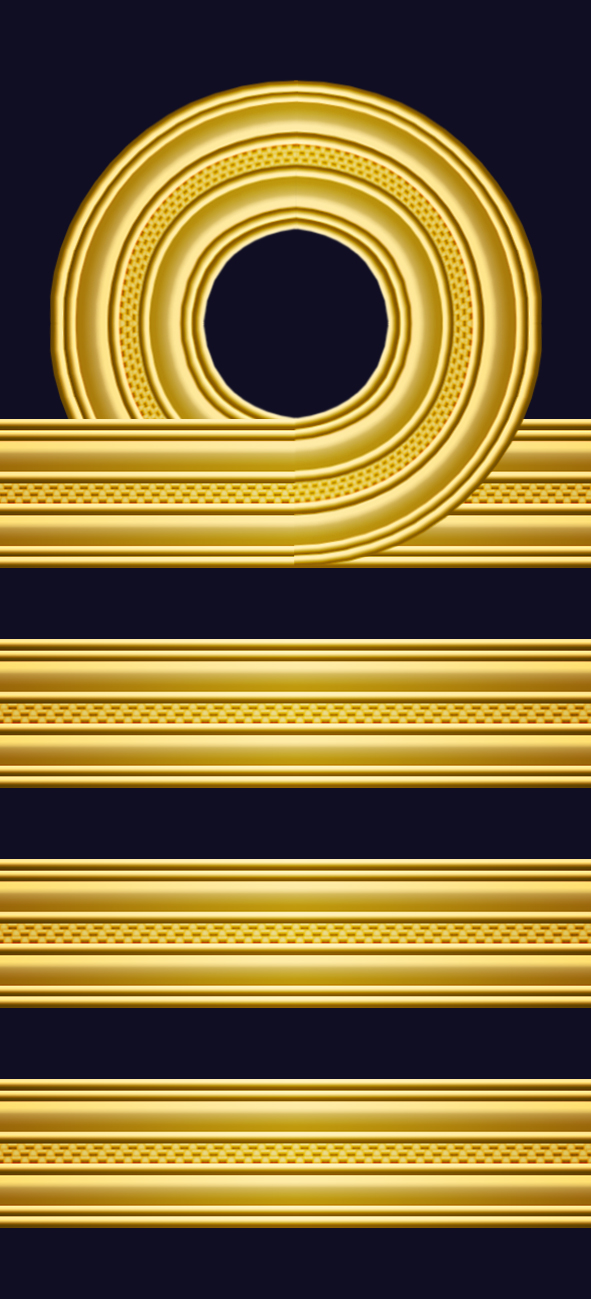
2. Embroidered shoulder mark (–2003)

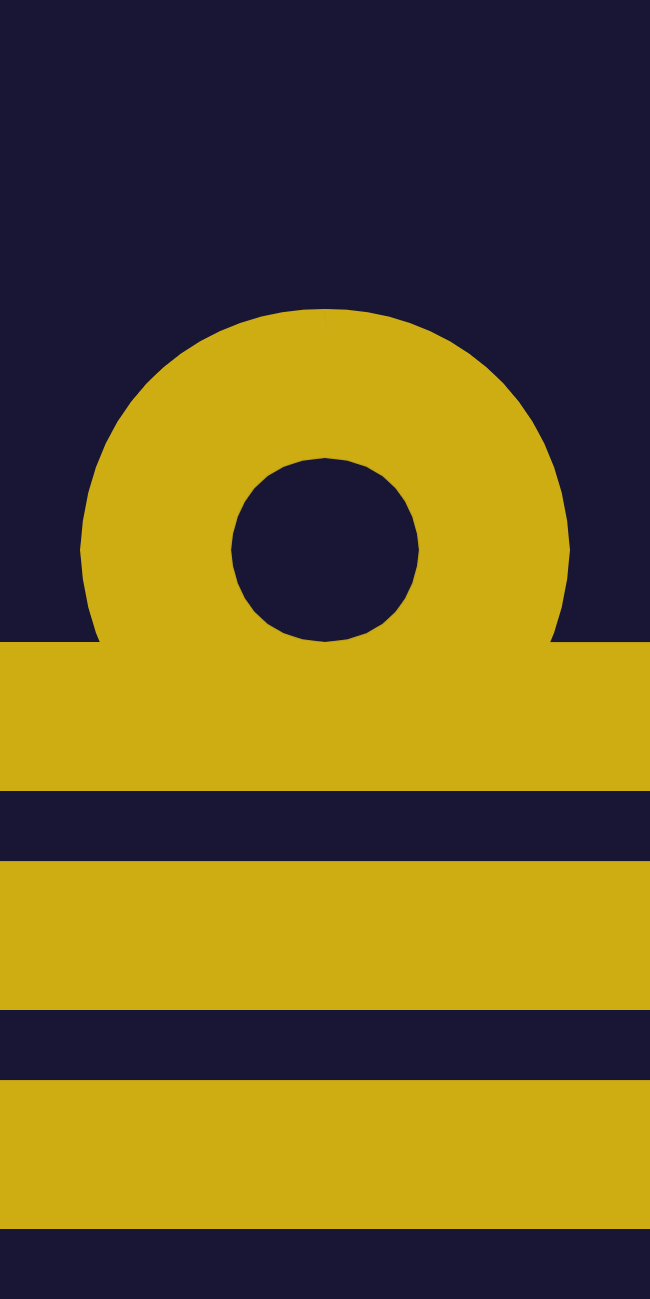
3. Woven shoulder mark (2003–present)

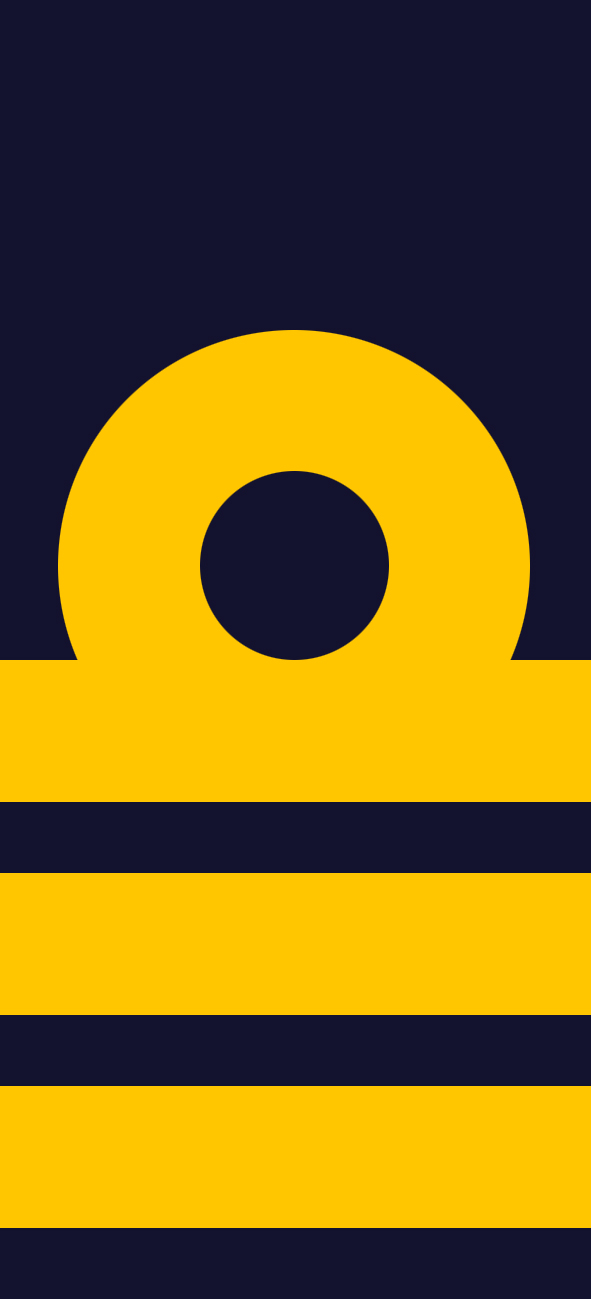
3. Woven shoulder mark (2003–present)

=== Sleeve insignia ===
Rank insignia is worn on both sleeves for inner suit jacket (innerkavaj m/48) and mess jacket (mässjacka m/1878).

1. On the sleeve an 12,6 mm rank insignia (gradbeteckning m/02) and galloon (galon m/02). The distance between galloons should be 6 mm. The distance from the bottom edge of the sleeve to the bottom edge of the top galloon should be 100 mm. This type of sleeve insignia with three galloons was worn by a lieutenant until 2003.

2. Before 2003, commanders wore four gold galloons and a loop of gold galloon. Since 2003, this type of sleeve insignia is used by a captain.

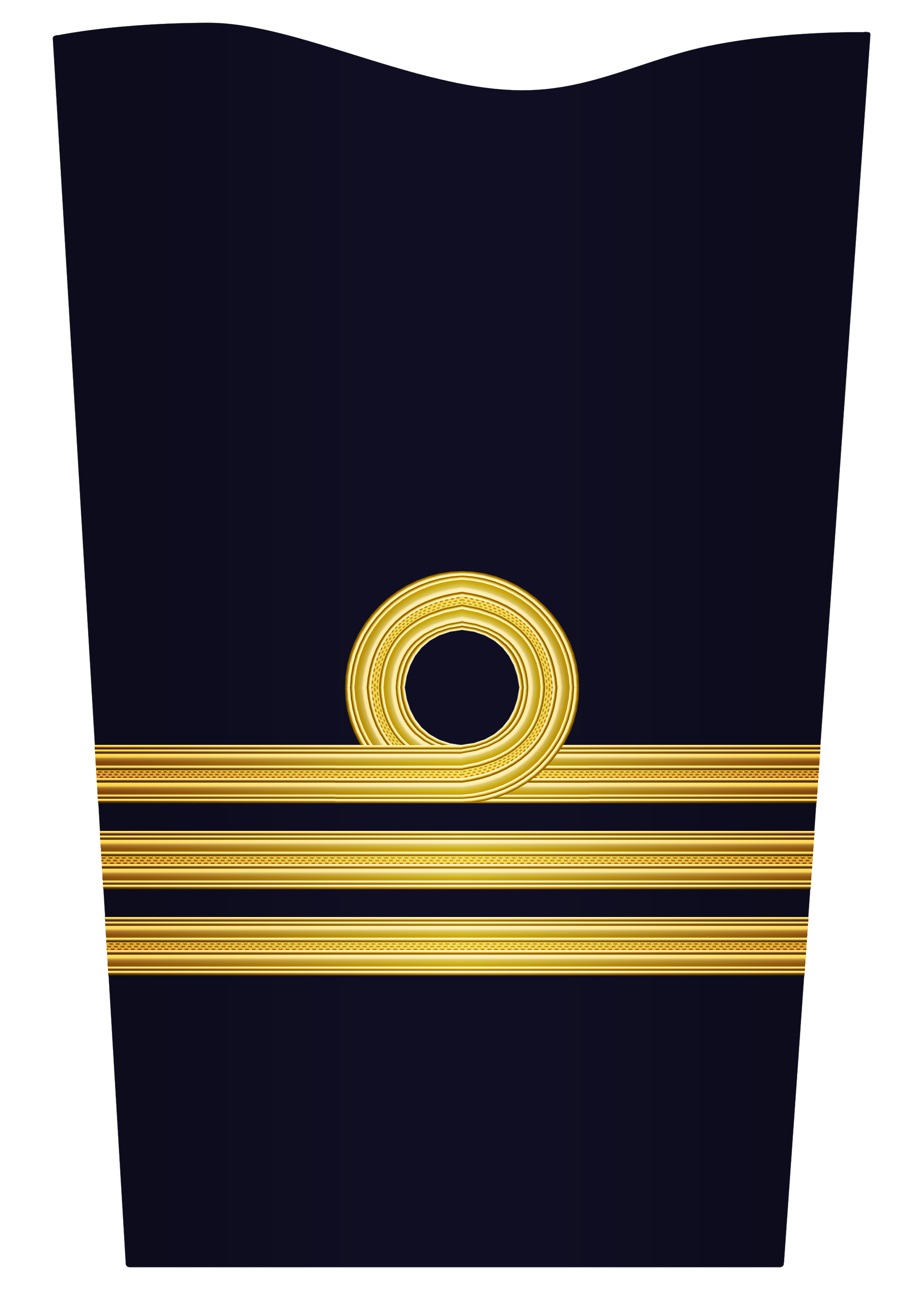
1. Sleeve insignia for a commander (2003–present)

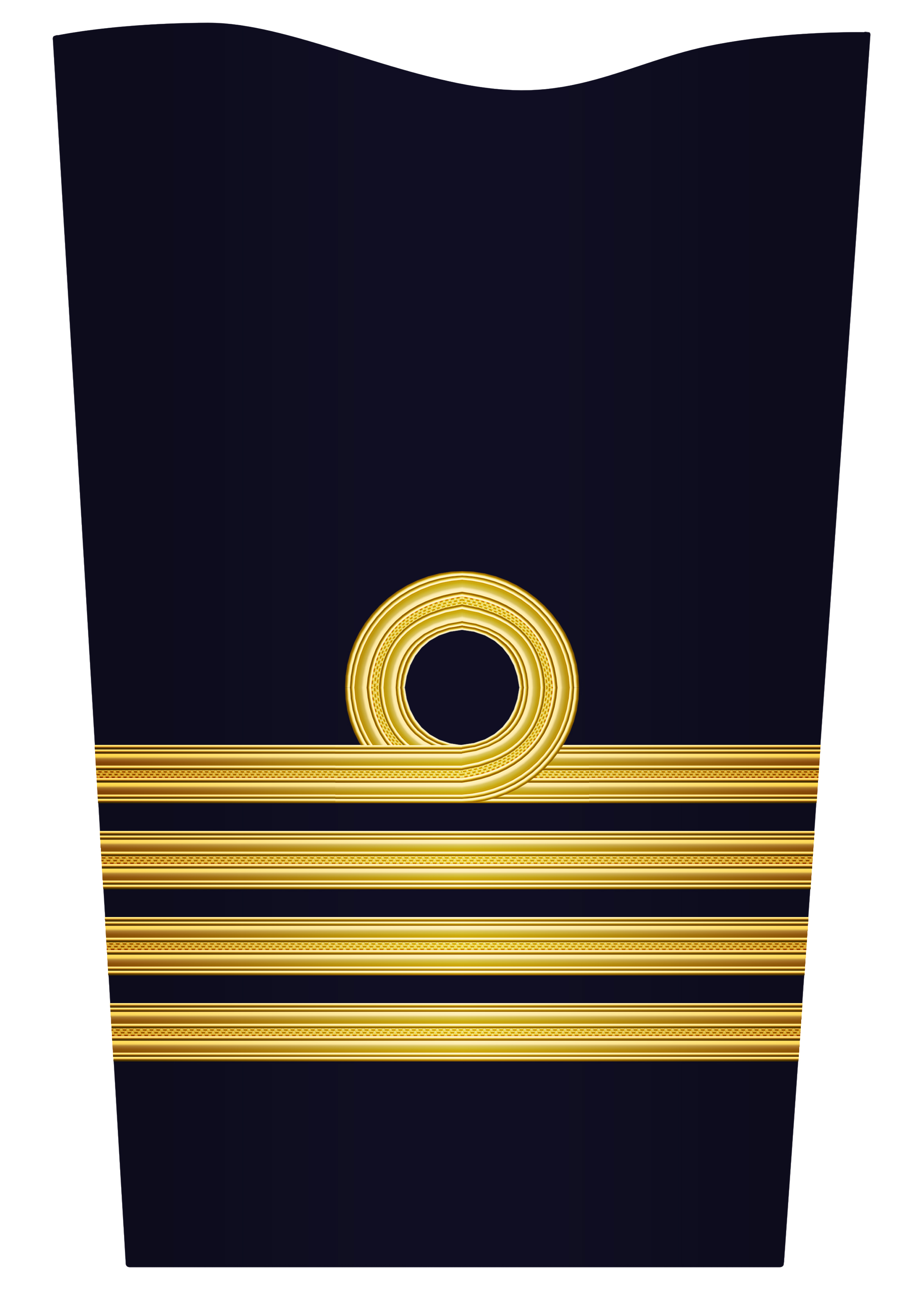
2. Sleeve insignia for a commander (–2003)

=== Hats ===
==== Peaked cap ====
A commander wears embellishments (skärmbeteckning m/02/skärmbroderi m/02) on the visor of the peaked cap (skärmmössa m/48). It also fitted with a hat badge (mössmärke m/78 off för flottan) and with a strap in form of a golden braid (mössträns m/42).

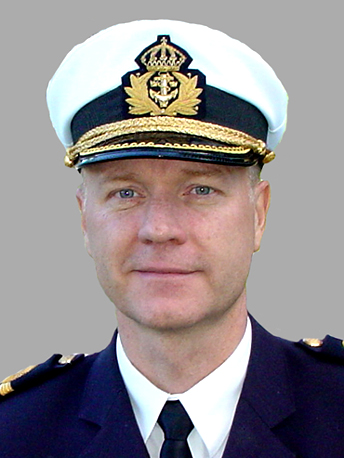
Peaked cap worn by Commander Jan Dunmurray.

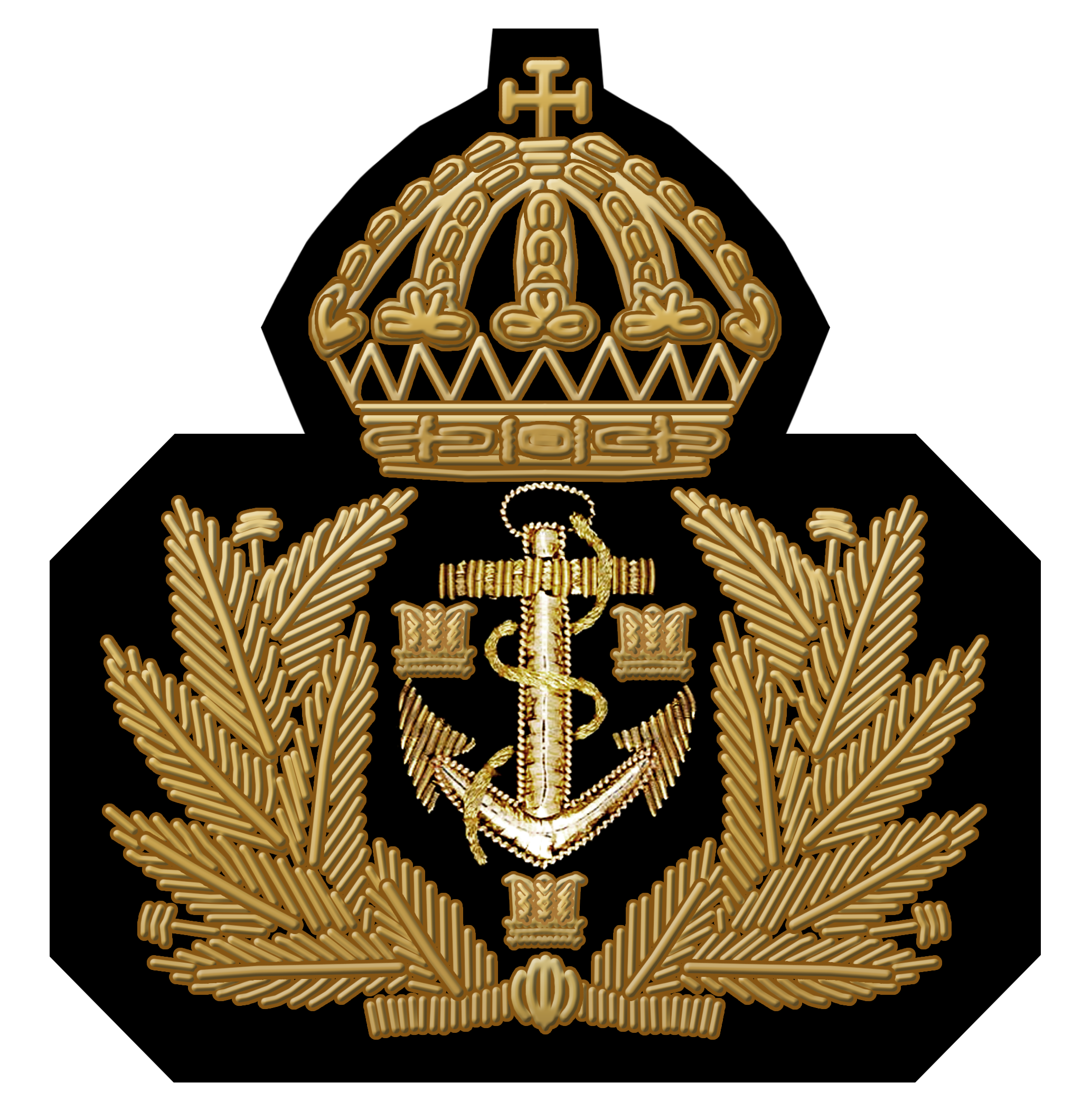
Hat badge

==== Side cap and winter hat ====
An officer wears a hat badge (mössmärke m/78 off) for the navy and another (mössmärke m/87 off) for amphibious units on the side cap (båtmössa m/48) and on the winter hat (vintermössa m/87).

=== Epaulette ===
A commander wears epaulette's (epålett m/1878) to white tie (frack m/1878) and to coat (rock m/1878). On the epaulette, a commander wears 4 mm fringes in two rows.

== Personal flags ==
The command flag of a commander (and for a lieutenant colonel, lieutenant commander and major), is the so-called Navy Pennant (Örlogsvimpel), which is a long swallowtailed pennant per fess blue and yellow. The Navy Pennant is carried on the Swedish Navy ships from or on which naval officer of a lower rank than captain exercises his command, or on which he travels in the service.

Navy Pennant
