= Admiral Ehrensvärd =

Admiral Ehrensvärd may refer to:

- Carl August Ehrensvärd (1745–1800), Swedish Navy general admiral
- Carl August Ehrensvärd (1858–1944) (1858–1944), Swedish Navy admiral
- Gösta Ehrensvärd (1885–1973) was a Swedish Navy vice admiral
