= Yngve Ekstrand =

Swedish Navy officer

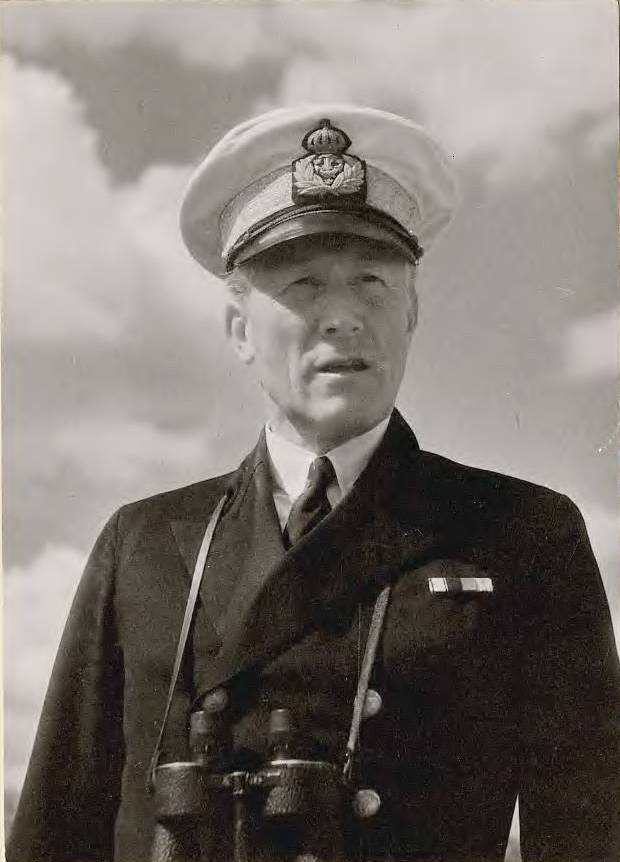
- Born: 22 February 1888; Uppsala, Sweden
- Died: 30 March 1951 (aged 63); Stockholm, Sweden
- Burial place: Galärvarvskyrkogården
- Military career
- Allegiance: Sweden
- Branch: Swedish Navy
- Service years: 1908–1951
- Rank: Rear Admiral
- Nickname: Sven Yngve Ekstrand
- Commands: HSwMS Drottning Victoria; Flag captain; Chief of the Naval Staff; Coastal Fleet; East Coast Naval District

Rear Admiral Sven Yngve Ekstrand (22 February 1888 – 30 March 1951) was a Swedish Navy officer. He was Chief of the Naval Staff from 1939 to 1942, Commander-in-Chief of the Coastal Fleet from 1942 to 1945 and the East Coast Naval District from 1945 to 1951.

== Early life ==
Ekstrand was born on 22 February 1888 in Uppsala, Sweden, the son of senior engineer Åke Gerhard Ekstrand and Hulda (née Mellgren). He had four siblings, three brothers and one sister. Ekstrand attended Norra Latin and, from 1900, Norra Real.

== Career ==
He became a sea cadet in 1902 and received his naval officer exam and was commissioned into the Swedish Navy as an acting sub lieutenant in 1908. Ekstrand was promoted to sub-lieutenant in 1910 and was a cadet officer at the Royal Swedish Naval Academy from 1915 to 1918 and was a teacher at the Royal Swedish Naval Staff College from 1918 to 1920. He was promoted to lieutenant in 1917 and was adjutant to the corps commanding officer in Karlskrona in 1923 and was first flag lieutenant (1:e flaggadjutant) in the staff of the Commander-in-Chief of the Coastal Fleet from 1926 to 1930.

Ekstrand was the adjutant to His Majesty the King in 1929 and was a teacher at the Royal Swedish Naval Staff College from 1929 to 1935. Ekstrand was a teacher at the Finnish War College in 1929 and was promoted to lieutenant commander in 1930. He was secretary of the 1930 Defense Commission and a teacher at the Royal Swedish Army Staff College in Stockholm from 1930 to 1934. Ekstrand was also a teacher in courses for senior naval officers in 1926 and 1932. He was head of the Communications Department of the Naval Staff in 1931 and head of the Operations Department of the Naval Staff from 1932 to 1936.

Ekstrand was promoted to commander in 1936 and was captain of HSwMS Drottning Victoria from 1936 to 1937. As captain of Drottning Victoria he represented the Swedish Navy at the Coronation Fleet Review at Spithead in connection with King George VI's coronation in May 1937. He became senior adjutant to His Majesty the King in 1937. Ekstrand was promoted to captain in 1937 and was flag captain the same year. He was Chief of the Naval Staff from 1939 to 1942 when he was promoted to rear admiral. Ekstrand was Commander-in-Chief of the Coastal Fleet from 1942 to 1945 when took command of the East Coast Naval District. Ekstrand was a vociferous proponent of Moral Re-Armament, both in Sweden and overseas. He died suddenly while still serving as commanding officer of the East Coast in the spring of 1951 and was given a state funeral.

== Personal life ==
In 1915 he married Lisa Burman (born 1892), the daughter of the banker Bernhard Burman and Tora Tjäder. He was the father of four daughters, one of whom was Brita (1918–2007) who in 1945 married the managing director Gunnar Nittzell (1916–2004).

== Death ==
Ekstrand died on Friday evening, 30 March 1951. He had suffered a heart attack while attending the annual meeting of the Naval Reserve Officers' Association (Flottans reservofficersförbund). Shortly after the meeting ended, he fell unconscious, and was pronounced dead at Serafimerlasarettet in Stockholm, where he had been taken by ambulance. The funeral service took place on 6 April 1951 at Skeppsholmen Church. Cremation at the Chapel of the Holy Cross (Heliga Korsets kapell). Ekstrand was buried on 11 April 1951 at Galärvarvskyrkogården in Stockholm.

== Dates of rank ==
- 1908 – Acting sub-lieutenant
- 1910 – Sub-lieutenant
- 1917 – Lieutenant
- 1930 – Lieutenant commander
- 1936 – Commander
- 1937 – Captain
- 1942 – Rear admiral

== Awards and decorations ==
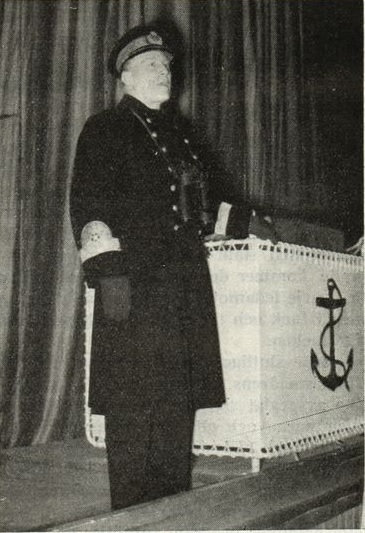
Admiral Ekstrand in 1944.

=== Swedish ===
- (Sweden) King Gustaf V's Jubilee Commemorative Medal (1948)
- (Sweden) Commander Grand Cross of the Order of the Sword
- (Sweden) Knight of the Order of the Polar Star
- (Sweden) Knight of the Order of Vasa
- (Sweden) Swedish Auxiliary Naval Corps' gold medal
- (Sweden) Sports badge in gold (1908)
- (Sweden) Shooting badge in gold (1912)

=== Foreign ===
- (Brazil) Grand Officer of the Order of Naval Merit
- (Poland) Grand Officer of the Order of Polonia Restituta
- (Denmark) Commander 2nd Class of the Order of the Dannebrog
- (Finland) 2nd Class of the Order of the Cross of Liberty with swords
- Commander of the Order of the White Rose of Finland
- (Nazi Germany) Order of the German Eagle 1st Class
- (Latvia) Officer of the Order of the Three Stars
- (France) Knight of the Legion of Honour
- (Russian Empire) Knight 3rd Class of the Order of Saint Stanislaus
- (Spain) 1st Class of the Crosses of Naval Merit, White Decoration (22 August 1929)
- (United Kingdom) King's Medal for Service in the Cause of Freedom

== Honours ==
- Member of the Royal Swedish Academy of War Sciences
- Honorary member of the Royal Swedish Society of Naval Sciences (1942)

Military offices
Preceded by Gösta Ehrensvärd	Flag captain 1937–1939	Succeeded by Helge Strömbäck
Preceded by Gösta Ehrensvärd	Chief of the Naval Staff; 1939–1942	Succeeded by Helge Strömbäck
Preceded by Gösta Ehrensvärd	Commander-in-Chief of the Coastal Fleet; 1942–1945	Succeeded by Erik Samuelson
Preceded by Hans Simonsson	East Coast Naval District; 1945–1951	Succeeded by Erik Anderberg
