= Chief of the Naval Staff (Sweden) =

Military post

- Chefen för marinstaben
- Incumbent; Captain Håkan Nilsson since 17 June 2022
- Ministry of Defence
- Type: Chief of the Naval Staff
- Abbreviation: CMS
- Reports to: Chief of Navy
- Seat: Muskö Naval Base (Note: The Chief of Naval Staff and his staff have previously been located at the following locations:: Birger Jarlsgatan 7, Stockholm (1907–1942); Banérgatan 62-64, Stockholm (1942–1981); Lidingövägen 24, Stockholm (1981–1994).)
- Term length: No fixed term
- Precursor: Chief of the Fleet Staff
- Formation: 1907, 2019
- First holder: RAdm Theodor Sandström (1907); Capt (N) Håkan Magnusson (2019)
- Final holder: MajGen Lars G. Persson
- Abolished: 1994
- Unofficial names: Marinstabschef
- Deputy: Vice Chief of the Naval Staff

The Chief of the Naval Staff (Swedish: Chefen för marinstaben, CMS, or Marinstabschef) is the professional head of the Swedish Naval Staff. The post was created in 1907 with rear admiral Theodor Sandström as the first incumbent. The post disappeared in 1994 and was reintroduced in 2019 when the new Naval Staff was established.

== History ==
=== Chief of the Naval Staff ===
The Chief of the Naval Staff post was created in 1907 after the Chief of the Fleet Staff was eliminated. The Chief of the Naval Staff was from 1936 to 1994 the second most senior member of the Swedish Navy after the Chief of the Navy and headed the Naval Staff. The position was initially held alternately by a rear admiral or a captain until 1964. In 1964, a change was made from which branch the Chief of the Naval Staff was selected. As a rule, the Chief of the Naval Staff was an officer of the Swedish Coastal Artillery, if the Chief of the Navy was an officer of the Swedish Fleet (Flottan), and a naval officer if the coastal artillery officer was Chief of the Navy. The Chief of the Navy was always a naval officer and thus the Chief of the Naval Staff remained a coastal artillery officer until the Naval Staff was disbanded in 1994 and the office was eliminated. In 2019, the Naval Staff was re-established and a Chief of the Naval Staff was appointed again, this time held by a captain.

=== Vice Chief of the Naval Staff ===
In 1941, through changes in the naval organization, a vice chief was appointed who was to be an active-duty regimental officer from the Swedish Coastal Artillery. This officer was to assist the Chief of the Naval Staff in the performance of their duties, and the Chief of the Naval Staff had the authority to assign specific responsibilities to this officer, particularly in matters concerning coastal artillery and coastal defence.

== Chiefs of the Naval Staff ==
=== Chiefs of the Naval Staff (1907–1994) ===
| No. | Portrait | Chief of the Naval Staff | Took office | Left office | Time in office | Defence branch | Chief of the Navy | Ref. |
|---|---|---|---|---|---|---|---|---|
| 1 | Theodor Sandström [sv] | Rear admiral Theodor Sandström (1852–1911) | 1907 | 1911 | 3–4 years | Navy | – | |
| 2 | Sten Ankarcrona [sv] | Captain; Sten Ankarcrona (1861–1936) | 17 February 1911 | 30 September 1913 (Note: Dismissed from the position on 19 July 1913.) | 2 years, 225 days | Navy | – | |
| 3 | Ludvig Sidner [sv] | Vice admiral Ludvig Sidner (1851–1917) | 1 October 1913 (Note: Appointed on 19 July 1913.) | 27 June 1916 | 2 years, 270 days | Navy | – | |
| 4 | Henning von Krusenstierna | Rear admiral Henning von Krusenstierna (1862–1933) | 27 June 1916 | 23 March 1927 | 10 years, 269 days | Navy | – | |
| 5 | Otto Lybeck | Rear admiral Otto Lybeck (1871–1947) | 1 April 1927 | 20 February 1936 | 8 years, 325 days | Navy | – | |
| 6 | Claës Lindsström | Rear admiral Claës Lindsström (1876–1964) | 24 February 1936 | 30 September 1936 | 219 days | Navy | Vice admiral Charles de Champs | |
| 7 | Gösta Ehrensvärd | Rear admiral (Note: Ehrensvärd was captain when taking office in 1937 and was promoted to rear admiral in 1938 while still in office.); Gösta Ehrensvärd (1885–1973) | 1937 | 1939 | 1–2 years | Navy | Vice admiral Charles de Champs | |
| 8 | Yngve Ekstrand | Captain; Yngve Ekstrand (1888–1951) | 1939 | 1942 | 2–3 years | Navy | Vice admiral Fabian Tamm | - |
| 9 | Helge Strömbäck | Rear admiral (Note: Strömbäck was captain when taking office on 1 April 1942 and was promoted to rear admiral on 1 October 1943 while still in office.); Helge Strömbäck (1889–1960) | 1 April 1942 | 1945 | 2–3 years | Navy | Vice admiral Fabian Tamm | |
| 10 | Erik Anderberg | Rear admiral Erik Anderberg (1892–1990) | 1945 | 1950 | 4–5 years | Navy | Vice admiral Helge Strömbäck | - |
| 11 | Ragnar Wetterblad [sv] | Captain; Ragnar Wetterblad (1894–1988) | 1950 | 1953 | 2–3 years | Navy | Vice admiral Helge Strömbäck | - |
| 12 | Bertil Berthelsson | Rear admiral (Note: Berthelsson was captain when taking office in 1953 and was promoted to rear admiral in 1954 while still in office.); Bertil Berthelsson (1902–1977) | 1953 | 1957 | 3–4 years | Navy | Vice admiral Stig H:son Ericson | |
| 13 | Einar Blidberg | Rear admiral Einar Blidberg (1906–1993) | 1957 | 1961 | 3–4 years | Navy | Vice admiral Stig H:son Ericson | - |
| - | Åke Lindemalm | Rear admiral Åke Lindemalm (1910–2004); Acting | 1960 | 1961 | 0–1 years | Navy | Vice admiral Stig H:son Ericson | - |
| - | Oscar Krokstedt | Rear admiral Oscar Krokstedt (1908–1985); Acting | 1961 | 1961 | 0 years | Navy | Vice admiral Stig H:son Ericson | - |
| 14 | Oscar Krokstedt | Rear admiral Oscar Krokstedt (1908–1985) | 1962 | 1964 | 1–2 years | Navy | Vice admiral Åke Lindemalm | - |
| 15 | Henrik Lange | Major general Henrik Lange (1908–2000) | 1964 | 1968 | 3–4 years | Navy (Coastal Artillery) | Vice admiral Åke Lindemalm | - |
| 16 | Bo Westin | Major general Bo Westin (1913–2009) | 1968 | 1970 | 1–2 years | Navy (Coastal Artillery) | Vice admiral Åke Lindemalm | - |
| 17 | Gunnar Eklund | Major general Gunnar Eklund (1920–2010) | 1 October 1970 | 1972 | 1–2 years | Navy (Coastal Artillery) | Vice admiral Bengt Lundvall | |
| 18 | Bo Varenius | Major general Bo Varenius (1918–1996) | 1972 | 1984 | 11–12 years | Navy (Coastal Artillery) | Vice admiral Bengt Lundvall; Vice admiral Per Rudberg | - |
| 19 | Torsten Engberg | Major general Torsten Engberg (1934–2018) | 1984 | 1987 | 2–3 years | Navy (Coastal Artillery) | Vice admiral Bengt Schuback | - |
| 20 | Lars G. Persson | Major general Lars G. Persson (born 1937) | 1987 | 1994 | 6–7 years | Navy (Coastal Artillery) | Vice admiral Bengt Schuback; Vice admiral Dick Börjesson | - |
None (1994–2019)
| 1 | Håkan Magnusson [sv] | Captain; Håkan Magnusson (born 1958) | 1 January 2019 | 31 May 2019 | 150 days | Navy | Rear admiral Jens Nykvist | |
| 2 | Fredrik Palmquist | Captain; Fredrik Palmquist (born ?) | 1 June 2019 | 31 December 2022 | 3 years, 15 days | Navy | Rear admiral Jens Nykvist; Rear admiral Ewa Skoog Haslum | |
| 3 | Håkan Nilsson | Captain; Håkan Nilsson (born ?) | 17 June 2022 | Incumbent | 4 years, 109 days | Navy | Rear admiral Ewa Skoog Haslum | |

== Vice Chiefs of the Naval Staff ==
| No. | Portrait | Vice/Deputy Chief of the Naval Staff | Title | Took office | Left office | Time in office | Defence branch | Chief of the Naval Staff | Ref. |
|---|---|---|---|---|---|---|---|---|---|
| 1 | Ragnar Smith [sv] | Colonel (Note: Smith was lieutenant colonel when taking office in 1941 and was promoted to colonel in 1942 while still in office.); Ragnar Smith (1892–1975) | Vice Chief (Souschef) | 1941 | 1945 | 3–4 years | Navy (Coastal Artillery) | Captain; Yngve Ekstrand; Rear admiral Helge Strömbäck | |
| 2 | Waldemar Wesström [sv] | Colonel; Waldemar Wesström (1894–1987) | Vice Chief (Souschef) | 1945 | 1954 | 8–9 years | Navy (Coastal Artillery) | Rear admiral Erik Anderberg; Captain; Ragnar Wetterblad; Rear admiral Bertil Berthelsson | |
