= Naval Base (Sweden) =

Military unit

- Marinbasen
- Active: 1928–present
- Country: Sweden
- Allegiance: Swedish Armed Forces
- Branch: Swedish Navy
- Type: Naval base
- Role: Training, maritime surveillance, base support
- Part of: CM (1928–1966); Milo S (1966–2000); OPIL (2000–2005); SAFHQ (2005–)
- Garrison/HQ: Karlskrona
- March: "Chefsmarsch" (Widqvist) (Note: The marsch was adopted in 1966 and was established for the first time through Naval Order 18/1976.)

Commanders
- Current commander: Capt (N) Fredrik Edwardson

The Naval Base (Swedish: Marinbasen, MarinB) is a naval unit within the Swedish Navy that has operated in various forms since 1928. The unit is mainly based within Karlskrona naval base in Karlskrona and but operations are also conducted at Berga Naval Base and Muskö Naval Base outside Stockholm and in Gothenburg.

== Heraldry and traditions ==
=== Colour ===
The colour was presented to the former Karlskrona Coastal Artillery Regiment (KA 2) at Stockholm Palace by His Majesty the King Gustaf V on 1 June 1945. It was used as regimental colour by KA 2 until 1 July 2001. KA 2 was disbanded in 2000, and during a disbandment ceremony on 31 October 2000, the colour was handed over to the South Coast Naval Base, which was the unit that will carry forward the traditions of the Karlskrona Coastal Artillery Regiment. The colour is drawn by Brita Grep and embroidered by hand in insertion technique by the company Libraria. Blazon: "On red cloth in the centre the badge of the former Coastal Artillery; two gunbarrels of older pattern in saltire between a royal crown proper and a blazing grenade and waves, all in yellow. In the first corner the monogram of His Majesty the King Charles XI surmounting an erect anchor under a royal crown proper, all in yellow".

=== Coat of arms ===
The coat of the arms of the South Coast Naval Base (ÖrlB S) 1966–1990, South Coast Naval Command (MKS) 1990–2000 and the South Coast Naval Base (MarinB S) 2000–2004. Blazon: "Azure, an anchor erect surmounted two gunbarrels of older pattern in saltire and a chief, all or".

=== Flag ===
The flag of the unit was a double swallow-tailed Swedish flag. The flag was presented to the then South Coast Naval Command (MKS/Fo 15) in 1976.

=== Medals ===
In 2007, the Marinbasens förtjänstmedalj ("Naval Base Medal of Merit") in gold and silver (MarinBGM/SM) was established. From 2001 to 2006, this medal was called Sydkustens marinbas förtjänstmedalj ("South Coast Naval Base Medal of Merit") in gold and silver (MarinbSGM/SM) and was of 8th size. Before 2001, it was called Sydkustens marinkommandos förtjänstmedalj (MKSGM/SM) ("South Coast Naval Command Medal of Merit"). The medal ribbon is of dark blue moiré. The navys coat of arms is attached to the ribbon.

=== Heritage ===
The Naval Base with Blekingegruppen, Kalmargruppen and Kronobergsgruppen has primarily the traditional heritage responsibility of the South Coast Naval Base, the East Coast Naval Base and Muskö Naval Yard (Muskö örlogsvarv) and older ships, which bore the same name as the naval base's current ships. Secondarily the traditional heritage responsibility is for all older naval regional units (commands) such as naval commands (MKS, MKV, MKO, MKN), naval bases (ÖrlB S, ÖrlB V, ÖrlB O including ÖrlBNO/Örlbavd Ro, ÖrlBNN), naval districts (BoMö and BoLu), naval districts MDS, MDÖS, MDV, MDO, MDG and MDN) and naval stations with their staffs as well as naval surveillance and base units.

== Commanding officers ==
- 1928–1933: Rear admiral Charles de Champs
- 1933–1936: Rear admiral Claës Lindsström
- 1936–1938: Rear admiral Gunnar Bjurner
- 1938–1942: Rear admiral Hans Simonsson
- 1942–1950: Rear admiral Gösta Ehrensvärd
- 1950–1958: Rear admiral Erik Samuelson
- 1958–1961: Rear admiral Sigurd Lagerman
- 1961–1966: Rear admiral Bertil Berthelsson
- 1963–1966: Rear admiral Stig Bergelin (acting)
- 1966–1974: Senior captain Hans Gottfridsson
- 1974–1980: Senior captain Lennart Ahrén
- 1980–1983: Senior captain Lennart Forsman
- 1983–1987: Senior captain Lennart Jedeur-Palmgren
- 1987–1990: Senior captain Sten Swedlund
- 1990–1994: Senior colonel Stefan Furenius
- 1994–1997: Senior captain Thomas Lundvall
- 1997–2000: Senior colonel Bo Wranker
- 2000–2003: Captain Bengt Jarvid
- 2003–2005: Captain Kenneth Olsson
- 2005–2005: Rear admiral (lower half) Anders Grenstad
- 2005–2007: Captain Lennart Månsson
- 2007–2009: Colonel Ola Truedsson
- 2009–2011: Captain Jan Thörnqvist
- 2011–2014: Captain Håkan Magnusson
- 2014–2019: Captain Erik Andersson
- 2019–2022: Captain Håkan Nilsson
- 2022–20xx: Captain Fredrik Edwardson

== Names, designations and locations ==
Name	Translation	From		To
Sydkustens marindistrikt	South Coast Naval District	1928-01-01	–	1957-09-30
Marinkommando Syd	Naval Command South	1957-10-01	–	1966-09-30
Sydkustens örlogsbas	South Coast Naval Base	1966-10-01	–	1990-06-30
Sydkustens marinkommando	South Coast Naval Command	1990-07-01	–	2000-06-30
Sydkustens marinbas	South Coast Naval Base; Naval Base South	2000-07-01	–	2004-12-31
Marinbasen	Naval Base	2005-01-01	–	
Designation		From		To
MDS		1928-01-01	–	1957-09-30
MKS		1957-10-01	–	1966-09-30
ÖrlB S		1966-10-01	–	1990-06-30
MKS		1990-07-01	–	2000-06-30
MarinB S		2000-07-01	–	2004-12-31
MarinB		2005-01-01	–	
Location		From		To
Karlskrona Garrison		1928-01-01	–	
