= Gösta Ehrensvärd =

Swedish Navy officer

Count Gösta Ehrensvärd
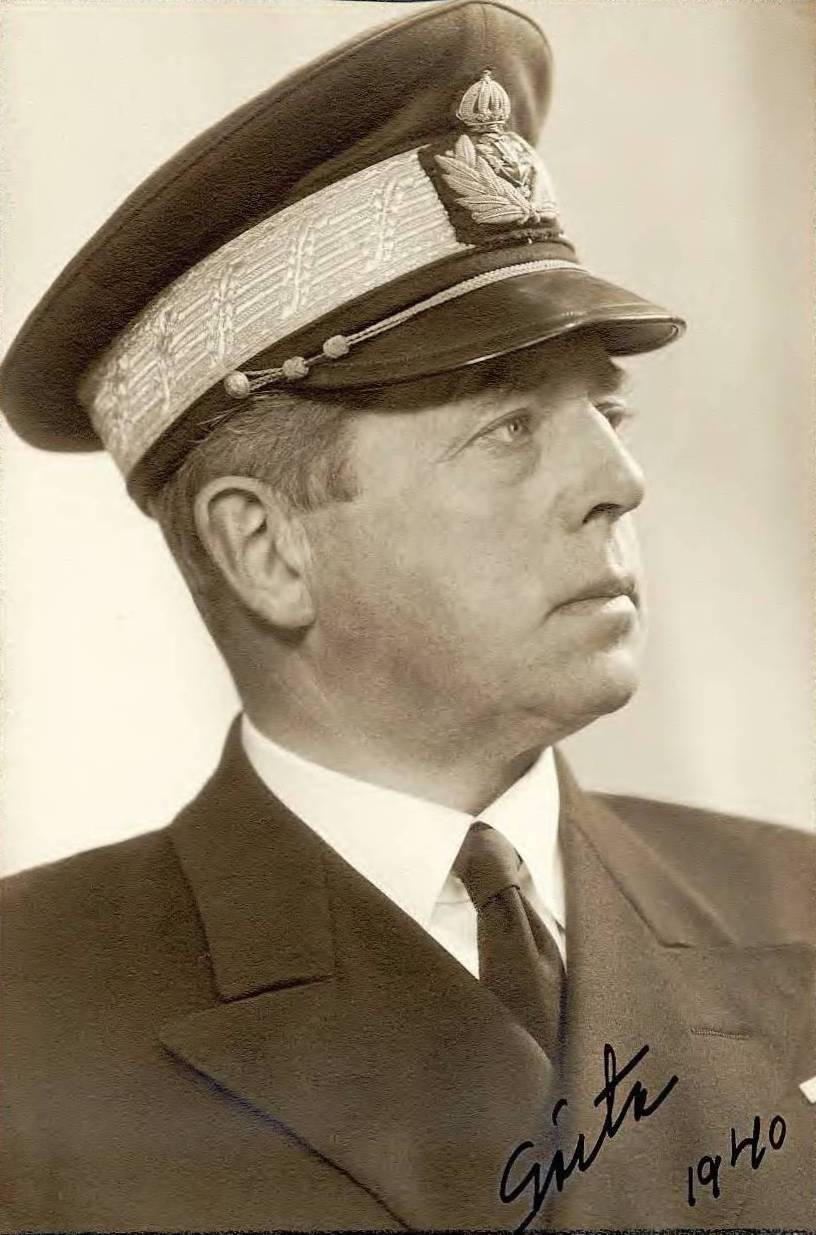
- Born: 10 February 1885; Skabersjö, Sweden
- Died: 2 November 1973 (aged 88); Hässleholm, Sweden
- Relatives: Carl August Ehrensvärd (father); Carl August Ehrensvärd (brother); Augustin Ehrensvärd (brother); Albert Ehrensvärd (uncle); Augustin Ehrensvärd (great-grandfather); Archibald Douglas (cousin)
- Military career
- Allegiance: Sweden
- Branch: Swedish Navy
- Service years: 1904–1950
- Rank: Vice Admiral
- Nickname: Gösta Carl Albert Ehrensvärd
- Commands: HSwMS Oscar II; HSwMS Drottning Victoria; Flag captain; Chief of the Naval Staff; Coastal Fleet; South Coast Navy District

Vice Admiral Count Gösta Carl Albert Ehrensvärd (10 February 1885 – 2 November 1973) was a senior Swedish Navy officer. Ehrensvärd began his naval career at the Royal Swedish Naval Academy, entering as a cadet at age 13 and commissioning as an acting sub-lieutenant in 1904. He advanced through the ranks, serving in both operational and staff positions, including flag adjutant, destroyer and torpedo boat commander, and instructor in naval warfare and strategy. He held key leadership roles such as head of the Communications and Operations Departments in the Naval Staff, flag captain of the Coastal Fleet, and Chief of the Naval Staff from 1937 to 1939, being promoted to rear admiral in 1938.

In 1939, Ehrensvärd became Commander-in-Chief of the Coastal Fleet, overseeing advanced exercises and preparing the fleet for wartime operations at the outbreak of World War II. He was recognized for his tactical skill, operational planning, and attention to personnel across all ranks. In 1942, he was appointed Commanding Admiral of the South Coast Navy District, a position he held until 1950, when he was promoted to vice admiral and retired from active service.

== Early life ==
Ehrensvärd was born on 10 February 1885 at Ebbarp in Skabersjö, Svedala Municipality, Sweden, the son of Admiral, Count Carl August Ehrensvärd (1858–1944) and his wife Baroness Lovisa Ulrika "Ulla" (née Thott). He was the brother of Chief of the Army, General Carl August Ehrensvärd (1892–1974) and Deputy Director of the Ministry of Defence Augustin Ehrensvärd (1887–1968). His great-grandfather was the fortress builder Augustin Ehrensvärd, his uncle was Albert Ehrensvärd and his cousin was Lieutenant General Archibald Douglas who preceded his brother Carl August Ehrensvärd on the Chief of the Army post.

== Career ==
Ehrensvärd became a cadet at the Royal Swedish Naval Academy at the age of 13 in 1898 and graduated on 26 October 1904. He was commissioned as an acting sub-lieutenant in the navy on 28 October the same year, and was promoted to sub-lieutenant on 26 October 1906. Ehrensvärd studied the higher course at the Royal Swedish Naval Staff College from 1910 to 1911. In 1911, he served on the Naval Staff, and on 31 October 1913 he was promoted to lieutenant.

From 1914 to 1916, he served as flag adjutant on the staff of the Coastal Fleet. In 1916 and 1917, he was commander of a torpedo boat division. He later served as an instructor in naval warfare at the Royal Swedish Naval Academy and taught strategy at the Royal Swedish Naval Staff College. In 1919, and again from 1923 to 1924, he was commander of a destroyer division. Between 1922 and 1923, he was placed at the disposal of the Defence Revision. On 28 August 1922, he was promoted to commander. That same year, he also served as first adjutant to the station commander in Karlskrona.

Ehrensvärd was editor of the journal Tidskrift i sjöväsendet from 1925 to 1927 and then served as head of the Communications Department in the Naval Staff from 1927 to 1929. He captained the HSwMS Oscar II in 1929 and was head of the Operations Department in the Naval Staff from 1929 to 1932 and served as a member of the 1930 Defence Commission from 1930 to 1932, being promoted to captain in 1933. Ehrensvärd was captain of the HSwMS Drottning Victoria from 1932 to 1933 and flag captain in the staff of the Commander-in-Chief of the Coastal Fleet from 1933 to 1936. He was Chief of the Naval Staff from 1937 to 1939 and was promoted to rear admiral in 1938.

Ehrensvärd played a key role in ensuring that the Coastal Fleet was an effective combat force at the outbreak of World War II in September 1939. He became Commander-in-Chief of the Coastal Fleet in the spring of 1939 and conducted increasingly advanced exercises in preparation for conflict. While some risks were involved in firing and accident drills, operations were carefully planned. Ehrensvärd was regarded as a skilled tactician, capable of leading the fleet both at sea along the coasts and within the archipelagos. He enjoyed the confidence of the fleet and was noted for his interest in personnel across all roles. The high standards he set for the ships' performance were accompanied by attention to engineers and stokers, who were often recognized for their contributions.

In 1942, he was appointed Commanding Admiral of the South Coast Navy District, a post he held until 1950 when he was promoted to vice admiral and retired from active service.

== Legacy ==
Ehrensvärd was known for his focus on modern, high-performance naval vessels, rejecting any romantic notions of sailing ships, although he personally enjoyed sailing small craft under challenging conditions. He was energetic, quick in both thought and action, and expected the same rigor from others, believing that high standards were essential for effective naval crews. As Commander-in-Chief of the Coastal Fleet from 1939, he played a central role in preparing it for war, overseeing advanced exercises and ensuring operational readiness. Ehrensvärd was respected for his tactical skill, attention to detail, and interest in personnel across all ranks, and he is credited with shaping the fleet's effectiveness, the professional culture of its crews, and enduring naval traditions.

== Personal life ==
On 5 January 1909 in Stockholm, Ehrensvärd married Anna Adelaide Vilhelmina Enell (1886–1972), the daughter of the pharmacist Henrik Gustaf Olof Enell and Emma Adelaide Margareta Öst. They had three children: Gösta Carl Henrik (1910–1980), Carl August (1913–1982), and Ulla Margareta (1918–1983).

== Death ==
Ehrensvärd died on 2 November 1973 in Hässleholm. He was interred at Tosterup Cemetery in Tomelilla Municipality.

== Dates of rank ==
- 28 October 1904 – Acting sub-lieutenant
- 26 October 1906 – Sub-lieutenant
- 31 October 1913 – Lieutenant
- 28 August 1922 – Commander
- 1933 – Captain
- 1938 – Rear admiral
- 1950 – Vice admiral

== Awards and decorations ==
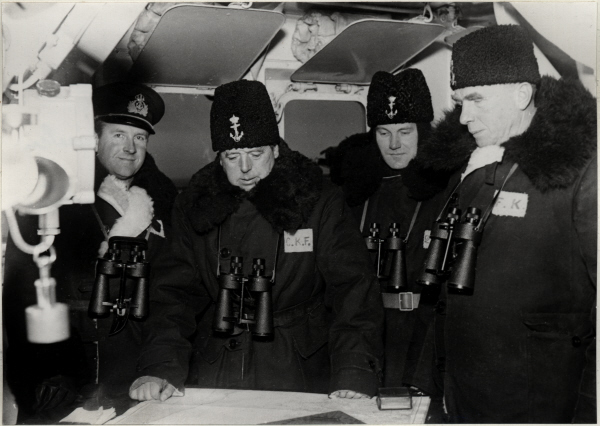
Officers aboard the HSwMS Sverige in 1939: from the left Lieutenant A.O.J. Falkman, Commander-in-Chief of the Coastal Fleet, Rear Admiral Gösta Ehrensvärd, Lieutenant B. Bertelsson and Captain Helge Strömbäck.

=== Swedish ===
- (Sweden) King Gustaf V's Jubilee Commemorative Medal (1948)
- (Sweden) Commander Grand Cross of the Order of the Sword (6 June 1946)
- (Sweden) Commander 1st Class of the Order of the Sword (6 June 1939)
- (Sweden) Knight of the Order of the Sword (6 June 1925)
- (Sweden) Knight of the Order of the Polar Star (1935)
- (Sweden) Knight of the Order of Vasa (1928)
- (Sweden) Swedish Auxiliary Naval Corps' gold medal (Sjövärnskårens guldmedalj)

=== Foreign ===
- (Norway) Grand Cross of the Order of St. Olav (1 July 1956)
- (Norway) Commander with Star of the Order of St. Olav
- (Denmark) Commander 1st Class of the Order of the Dannebrog
- (Spain) Cross of Naval Merit, White Decoration
- Commander of the Order of the White Rose of Finland (July 1924)
- (Poland) Commander of the Order of Polonia Restituta
- Knight of the Order of the Crown of Italy (1913)
- (Russian Empire) Knight 3rd Class of the Order of Saint Stanislaus (1908)
- (Ottoman Empire) 4th Class of the Order of the Medjidie (1906)
- (Denmark) Danish Medal of Freedom (Dansk frihetsmedalj)

== Honours ==
- Member of the Royal Swedish Academy of War Sciences (1933)
- Member of the Royal Swedish Society of Naval Sciences (1920; honorary member in 1938)

Military offices
| Preceded by Hans Simonsson | Flag captain 1933–1936 | Succeeded by Yngve Ekstrand |
| Preceded by Charles de Champs | Chief of the Naval Staff; 1937–1939 | Succeeded by Yngve Ekstrand |
| Preceded by Fabian Tamm | Commander-in-Chief of the Coastal Fleet; 1939–1942 | Succeeded by Yngve Ekstrand |
| Preceded by Hans Simonsson | South Coast Navy District; 1942–1949 | Succeeded by Erik Samuelson |
Professional and academic associations
| Preceded by Hans Simonsson | Chairman of the Royal Swedish Society of Naval Sciences; 1943–1949 | Succeeded by Erik Samuelson |
