= Erik Anderberg =

Swedish Navy officer

CVO Erik Anderberg
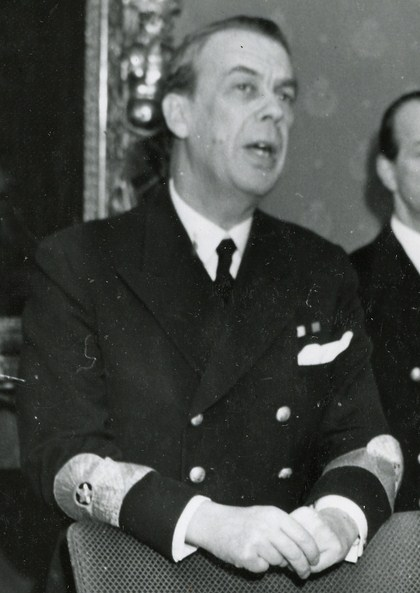
- Anderberg in 1947.
- Born: Erik Magnus Anderberg; 1 January 1892; Stockholm, Sweden
- Died: 28 February 1990 (aged 98)
- Burial place: Galärvarvskyrkogården
- Military career
- Branch: Swedish Navy
- Service years: 1912–1957
- Rank: Vice Admiral
- Commands: Military Signals Department, Defence Staff; HSwMS Sverige; Flag captain; Royal Swedish Naval Staff College; Chief of the Naval Staff; East Coast Naval District

Vice Admiral Erik Magnus Anderberg CVO (1 January 1892 – 28 February 1990) was a Swedish Navy officer. He is famous for being the grand architect of the notion of a unified Swedish signal intelligence authority. Anderberg served as captain of the HSwMS Sverige from 1940 to 1941, commander of the Royal Swedish Naval Staff College from 1943 to 1945, Chief of the Naval Staff from 1945 to 1950 and as commanding officer of the East Coast Naval District from 1951 to 1957.

== Early life ==
Anderberg was born on 1 January 1892 in the Rörstrand neighborhood of Stockholm, Sweden, the son of accountant Anders Anderberg and his wife Anna Eidem-Andersson. He was admitted at age 14 at the six-year long course at the Royal Swedish Naval Academy where he became underlöjtnant in 1912. During his time as a cadet, he served, among other things, aboard the cruiser HSwMS Fylgia and the corvette HSwMS Saga. In the same class, throughout the entire education period was Jacob Wallenberg, later the CEO of Stockholms Enskilda Bank. Between these two a constant struggle of becoming first occurred, and a friendship that lasted a lifetime.

== Career ==
After the World War II's neutrality watch and education during the first years as an officer, Anderberg made a lasting effort in the signal and intercommunication service. In 1917 he was in France where he was educated at the École spérieure d'électricité in Paris. Anderberg then underwent radio studies in Paris from 1919 to 1920.

During the interwar period, Anderberg's time was filled with teachership at various intercommunication courses, serving as a teacher of intercommunication at the Royal Swedish Naval Staff College from 1923 to 1924 and as a naval assistant at the Board of Telecommunications Services (Telegrafstyrelsen). Anderberg was promoted to lieutenant (kapten) in 1921 and served in the Naval Staff from 1922 to 1928 and from 1932 to 1934. At the end of the 1920s, when he served in the Communications Department of the Naval Staff, new signal books were prepared. At the same time, he served as attaché at the International Radiotelegraph Conference in Washington, D.C. From 1934 he participated in the preparation of the International Signal Book. Anderberg served as naval attaché in Paris and The Hague from 1934 to 1937 when he was promoted to commander. While in Paris, he tutored Prince Bertil, Duke of Halland during his service at the Swedish Embassy.

Anderberg's technical orientation, his intuitive talent, good memory and outstanding language skills made him particularly suitable for tasks in international contexts. He also engaged in ciphers, where he became an expert of international standing. Anderberg is considered the grand architect of the notion of a unified Swedish signal intelligence authority after playing a crucial role both in the practical development of radio monitoring and in the early recruitment of key civilian personnel of high calibre for cryptoanalytical work. In the spring of 1931, regular signal collection of military radio traffic was started on the coastal defence ship HSwMS Drottning Victoria. It comprised Russian, German, and English signals. This was done at the initiative of then captain Anderberg. In 1937 he was appointed head of the Military Signals Department in the new Defence Staff. Before this, under the aegis of the old General Staff, Anderberg had organized courses in cryptology for specially selected candidates from 1930.

In 1940 he was appointed captain of the coastal defence ship HSwMS Sverige, which he commanded until 1941. Anderberg served as flag captain in the Coastal Fleet from 1941 to 1943 and he was promoted to captain in 1942. He was then the head of the Royal Swedish Naval Staff College from 1943 to 1945 when he was promoted to rear admiral. Anderberg was appointed Chief of the Naval Staff in 1945 and five years later he served as naval attaché in Washington, D.C. and Ottawa. In 1951 he was appointed commanding officer of the East Coast Naval District. Anderberg retired and left the position in 1957 and was at the same time promoted to vice admiral. After retirement, Anderberg served on the board of Ericsson and Svenska Ackumulator AB Jungner. Anderberg kept his interest in the navy and what happened there. He participated in gatherings, anniversaries and proven talks despite an increasingly reduced visual capacity.

== Personal life ==
In 1929 he married Margaretha Lindahl (1903–1995), the daughter of Arvid Lindahl and Hulda Larsson. He was the father of Carl (born 1930) and Magnus (born 1938). Anderberg died on 28 February 1990 and was buried at Galärvarvskyrkogården in Stockholm.

== Dates of rank ==
- 1912 – Acting sub-lieutenant
- 19?? – Sub-lieutenant
- 1921 – Lieutenant
- 1937 – Commander
- 1942 – Captain
- 1945 – Rear admiral
- 1957 – Vice admiral

== Awards and decorations ==
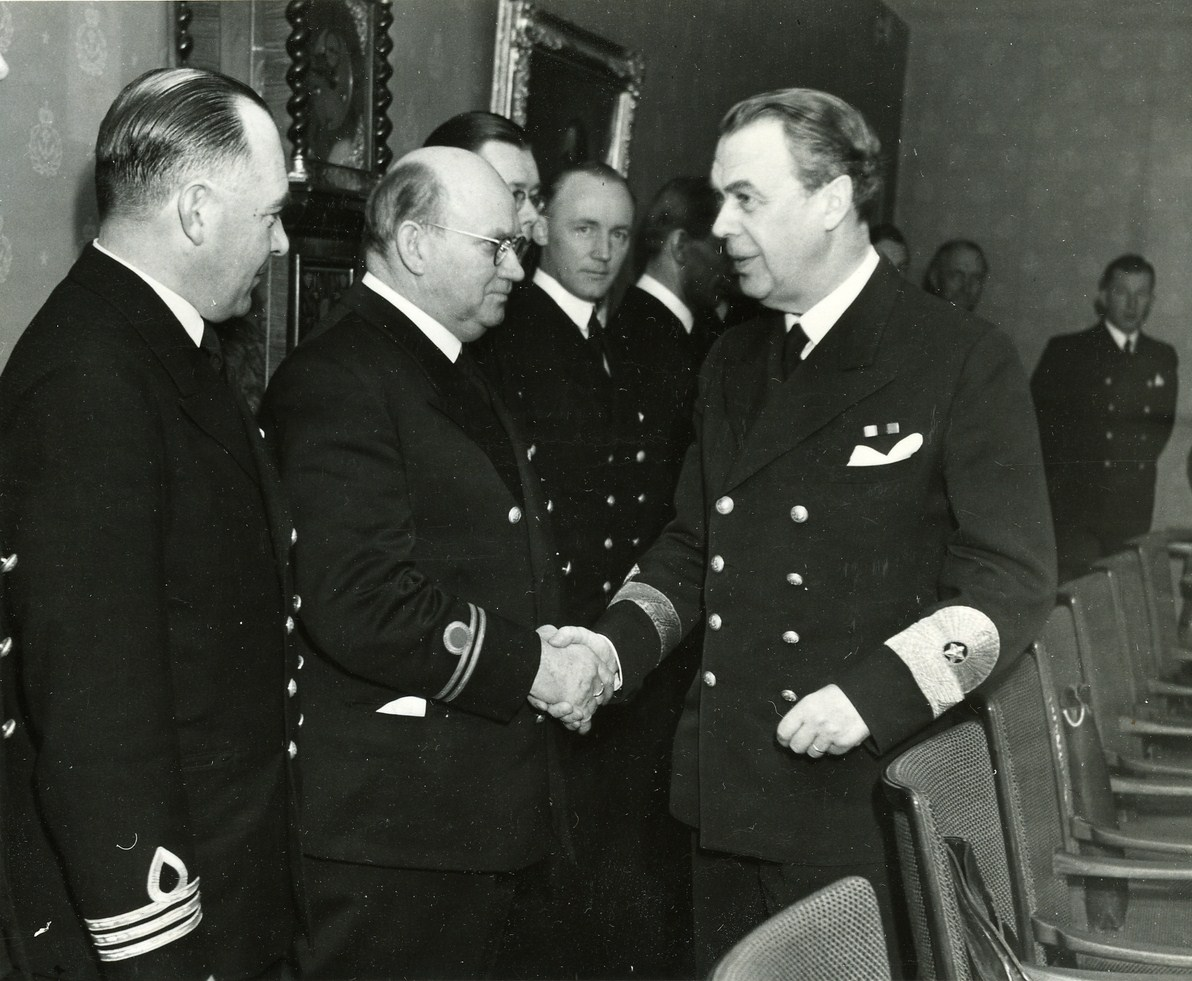
Anderberg (right) in 1947.

=== Swedish ===
- (Sweden) King Gustaf V's Jubilee Commemorative Medal (1948)
- (Sweden) Commander Grand Cross of the Order of the Sword (11 November 1952)
- (Sweden) Knight of the Order of the Polar Star (1941)
- (Sweden) Knight 1st Class of the Order of Vasa (1931)

=== Foreign ===
- (United States) Commander of the Legion of Merit (11 January 1956)
- (Denmark) Commander 1st Class of the Order of the Dannebrog
- (United Kingdom) Honorary Knight Commander of the Royal Victorian Order (June 1956)
- (France) Commander of the Legion of Honour
- (Netherlands) Commander of the Order of Orange-Nassau with swords

== Honours ==
- Member of the Royal Swedish Academy of War Sciences (1941)
- Honorary member of the Royal Swedish Society of Naval Sciences (1945)

== Bibliography ==
- Anderberg, Erik (1926). Maritim förbindelsetjänst under världskriget: en studie. Marinlitteraturföreningen, 0348-2405; 28 (in Swedish). Stockholm: Marinlitteraturföreningens förl. SELIBR 1339639.

Military offices
Preceded by None	Defence Staff's Military Signals Department; 1937–1940	Succeeded by Sture Montelius
Preceded by Helge Strömbäck	Flag captain 1941–1943	Succeeded by Erik Samuelson
Preceded by Eric Öberg	Royal Swedish Naval Staff College; 1943–1945	Succeeded by Ragnar Smith
Preceded by Helge Strömbäck	Chief of the Naval Staff; 1945–1950	Succeeded by Ragnar Wetterblad
Preceded by Yngve Ekstrand	East Coast Naval District; 1951–1957	Succeeded by Erik af Klint
