= Fabian Tamm =

Swedish Navy officer (1879–1955)

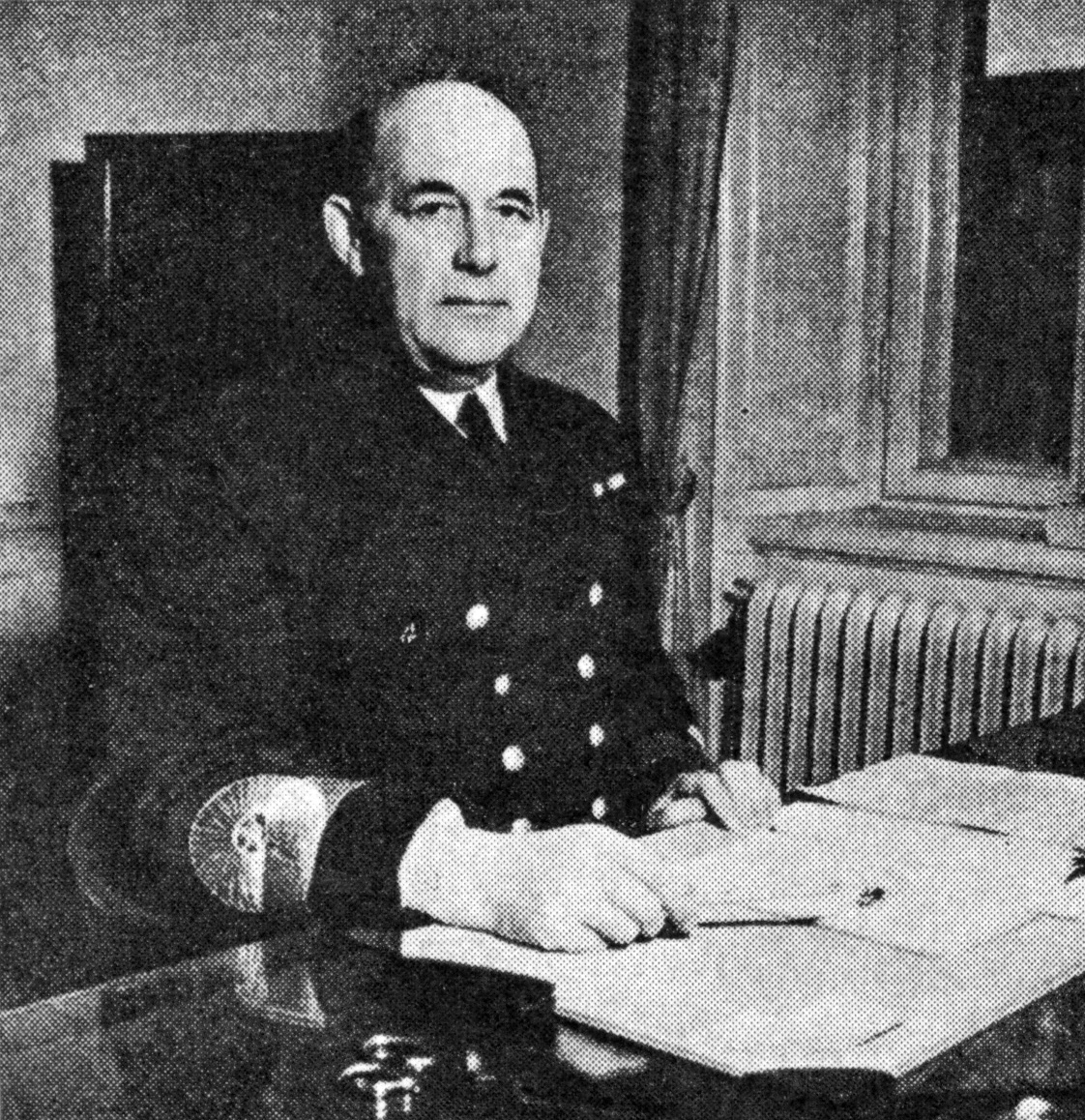
- Born: Claës Fabian Tamm; 13 November 1879; Film, Sweden
- Died: 4 October 1955 (aged 75); Stockholm, Sweden
- Burial place: Galärvarvskyrkogården, Stockholm
- Military career
- Branch: Swedish Navy
- Service years: 1899–1945
- Rank: Admiral
- Commands: HSwMS Dristigheten; Flag captain; Military Office of the Naval Defence; Commander-in-Chief of Coastal Fleet; Chief of the Navy

Admiral Claës Fabian Tamm (13 November 1879 – 4 October 1955) was a Swedish Navy officer. Tamm began his naval career as an acting sub-lieutenant in 1899 and was promoted to sub-lieutenant in 1901. After attending the Royal Swedish Naval Staff College, he became a lieutenant in 1907 and taught at the Royal Swedish Naval Academy. From 1914 to 1917, he served as naval attaché in Berlin and Copenhagen. Tamm steadily advanced through the ranks, becoming a lieutenant commander in 1918 and head of the Royal Swedish Naval Academy in 1921. He was promoted to rear admiral in 1933 and appointed Commander-in-Chief of the Coastal Fleet that same year. In 1939, he became Chief of the Navy, a position he held until 1945, after which he was promoted to admiral in the reserve in 1947. Outside his military career, he chaired several companies, including Ströms Bruks AB and Rederi AB Svea.

== Early life ==
Tamm was born on 13 November 1879 in Österbybruk, Uppsala County, Sweden, the son of the Governor of Stockholm and cabinet minister, Baron Claës Gustaf Adolf Tamm and his wife Ebba (née Tersmeden). He became a second-class non-commissioned flag officer (flaggunderofficer av andra graden) in the Swedish Navy on 4 April 1898, and took the naval officer examination on 1 November 1899.

== Career ==
Tamm was commissioned as a naval officer with the rank of acting sub-lieutenant in the Swedish Navy on 3 November 1899 and promoted to sub-lieutenant on 25 October 1901. He attended the Royal Swedish Naval Staff College from 1904 to 1906 and was promoted to lieutenant on 1 November 1907. Tamm served as adjutant and librarian at the Royal Swedish Naval Academy as well as teacher in law of war and maritime law from 1907 to 1910 and in naval warfare from 1910. He was adjutant at the Military Office of the Ministry for Naval Affairs from 1911. On 1 May 1914, he was appointed naval attaché in Berlin and Copenhagen, a position he held until 20 January 1917. That same year, he became a member of the Royal Swedish Society of Naval Sciences and served as its secretary from 1918 to 1921. On 1 July 1918, he was appointed assistant military attaché in Berlin, serving until 30 May that year. He became lieutenant commander on 31 December 1918 and was formally promoted to the position on 29 April 1919. Between 1919 and 1921, he served as adjutant to the station commander in Karlskrona.

On 13 October 1921, he became head of the Royal Swedish Naval Academy, a position he held until 1925. He was promoted to commander on 16 February 1923 and became head of a department in the Naval Staff from 1926 to 1929. Promoted to captain on 11 February 1927, he formally assumed the position on 1 June 1928. He was a member of the defence inquiry in 1928 and 1929, and served as flag captain in the Commander-in-Chief of the Coastal Fleet's staff from 1930 to 1931. On 15 April 1931, he was appointed head of the Military Office of the Naval Defence (Sjöförsvarets kommandoexpedition). In 1932, he served as an expert at the World Disarmament Conference in Geneva. Promoted to rear admiral on 27 January 1933, he officially assumed the role in the navy on 15 April 1933 and, that same year, became Commander-in-Chief of the Coastal Fleet. Tamm was appointed Chief of the Navy and promoted to vice admiral on 20 January 1939 and succeeded Vice Admiral Charles de Champs on 1 April the same year with an appointment until 31 March 1945. He was appointed admiral in the reserve in 1947, two years after he left active service.

In addition to his military activities, Tamm was chairman of the board of Ströms Bruks AB, Ljusne-Woxna AB and Rederi AB Svea (1945–52). Tamm was also chairman of the board of the Association of Army, Navy and Air Film (Föreningen Armé- Marin- och Flygfilm) from 1932 to 1939 and board member of AB Finnboda Varv.

== Personal life ==
On 4 January 1908 at Hargs bruk in Hargs socken, he married Baroness Eva Ebba Gustava Beck-Friis (1884–1963), the daughter of Baron Joachim Beck-Friis och Baroness Anna van Otter.

== Death ==
Tamm died on 4 October 1955. He was interred on 16 October 1955 at Galärvarvskyrkogården in Stockholm.

== Dates of rank ==
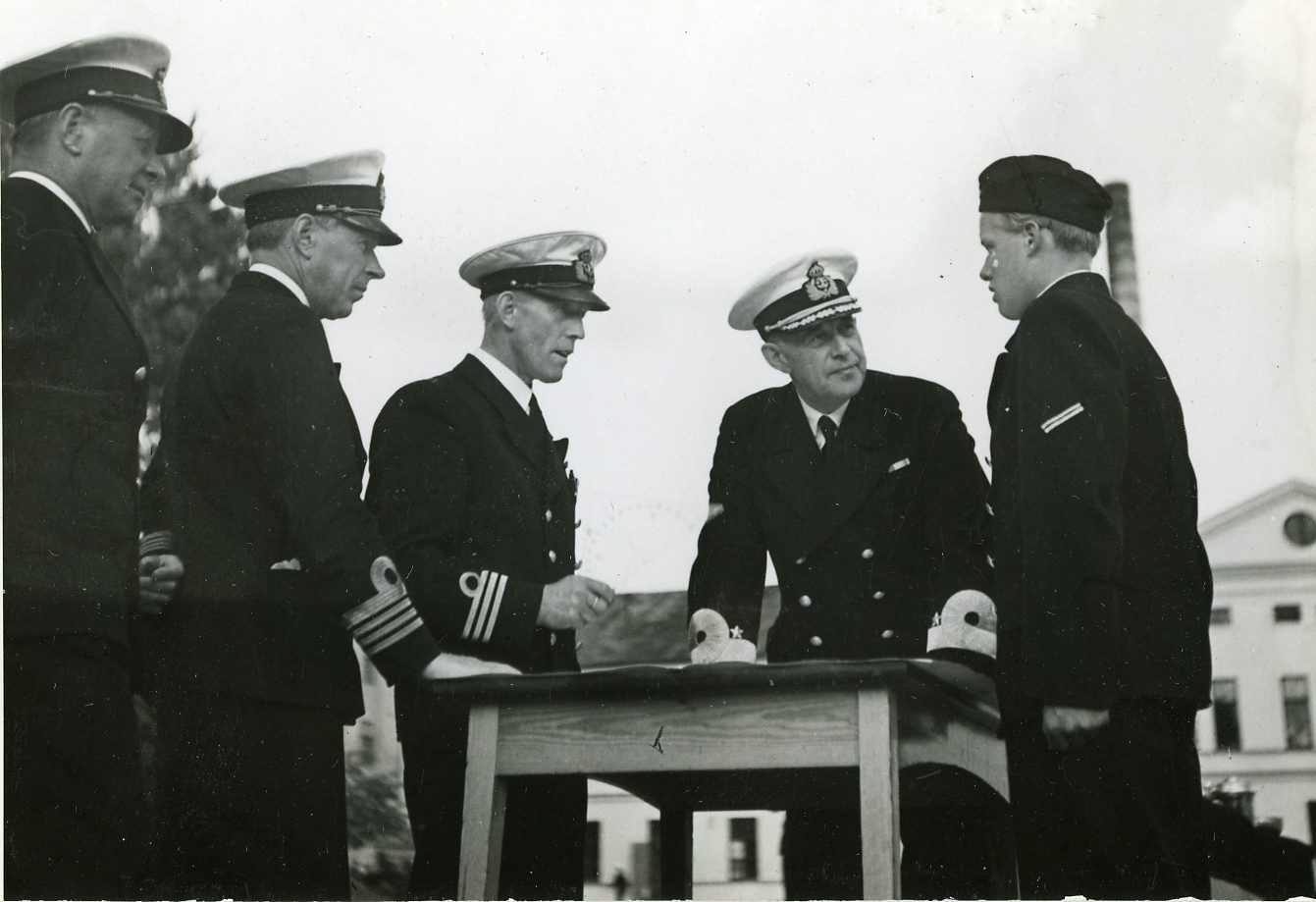
Tamm (second from right) in 1944.

- 3 November 1899 – Acting sub-lieutenant
- 25 October 1901 – Sub-lieutenant
- 1 November 1907 – Lieutenant
- 31 December 1918 – Lieutenant commander
- 16 February 1923 – Commander
- 11 February 1927 – Captain
- 27 January 1933 – Rear admiral
- 1 April 1939 – Vice admiral
- 1947 – Admiral

== Awards and decorations ==
=== Swedish ===
- (Sweden) Commander Grand Cross of the Order of the Sword (6 June 1939)
- (Sweden) Commander 1st Class of the Order of the Sword (15 May 1933)
- (Sweden) Commander of the Order of the Sword (6 June 1930)
- (Sweden) Knight of the Order of the Sword (5 May 1920)
- (Sweden) Knight of the Order of the Polar Star (6 JUne 1931)
- (Sweden) Knight of the Order of Vasa (15 December 1921)
- (Sweden) King Gustaf V's Olympic Commemorative Medal (Konung Gustaf V:s olympiska minnesmedalj)
- (Sweden) Swedish Voluntary Motorboat Corps' Gold Medal (Sveriges frivilliga motorbåtskårs guldmedalj)
- (Sweden) Konung Gustaf V:s olympiska minnesmedalj (1912)

=== Foreign ===
- Knight Grand Cross of the Order of the Crown of Italy
- (Latvia) Grand Cross of the Order of the Three Stars
- (Nazi Germany) Order of the German Eagle with Star
- (Denmark) Commander 1st Class of the Order of the Dannebrog
- (Denmark) Commander of the Order of the Dannebrog (15 May 1923)
- (Denmark) Knight of the Order of the Dannebrog (22 November 1903)
- Commander 1st Class of the Order of the White Rose of Finland
- Commander of the Order of the White Rose of Finland (July 1924)
- (Norway) Commander with Star of the Order of St. Olav
- (Poland) Commander 1st Class of the Order of Polonia Restituta
- (Spain) Cross of Naval Merit with White Decoration (3 August 1922)
- (Italy) Officer of the Order of Saints Maurice and Lazarus (1923)
- (Mecklenburg) Knight 1st Class of the Order of the Griffon (1914)
- (Kingdom of Prussia) Knight 3rd Class of the Order of the Crown (1917)
- (Russian Empire) Knight 3rd Class of the Order of St. Anna (1914)
- (Finland) Finnish Defense Corps' cross of merit (Finska skyddskårernas förtjänstkors)

== Honours ==
- Member of the Royal Swedish Society of Naval Sciences (1914; honorary member in 1933)
- Member of the Royal Swedish Academy of War Sciences (1925)

Military offices
Preceded by Claës Lindsström	Flag captain 1930–1931	Succeeded by Hans Simonsson
Preceded by Gunnar Unger	Military Office of the Naval Defence; 1931–1933	Succeeded by Hans Simonsson
Preceded by Harald Åkermark	Commander-in-Chief of Coastal Fleet; 1933–1939	Succeeded by Gösta Ehrensvärd
Preceded by Charles de Champs	Chief of the Navy; 1939–1945	Succeeded by Helge Strömbäck
