= Erik Samuelson =

Swedish Navy officer

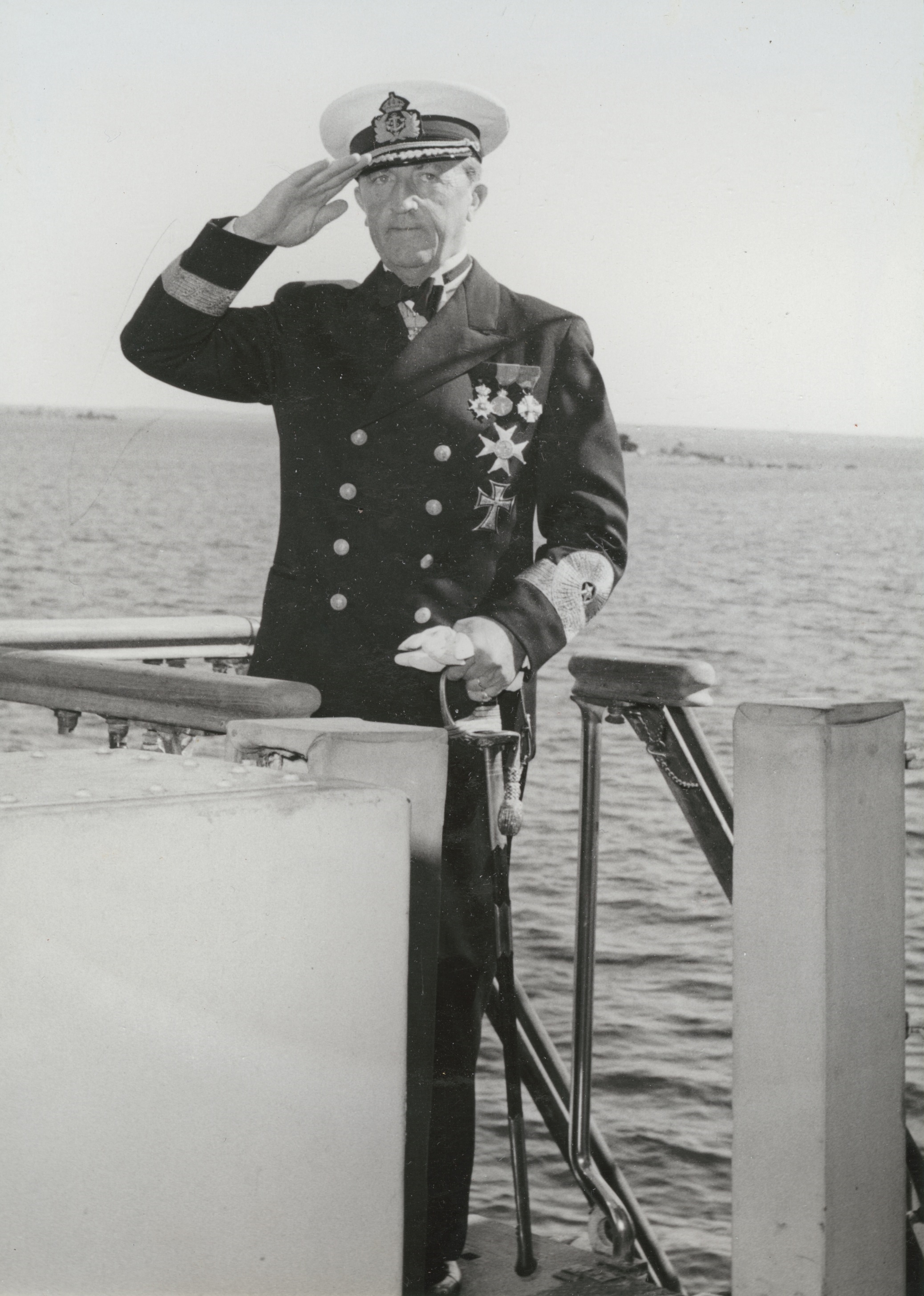
- Samuelson as rear admiral.
- Born: Johan Erik Samuelson; 16 April 1893; Grästorp, Sweden
- Died: 15 December 1964 (aged 71); Ingarö, Sweden
- Burial place: Galärvarvskyrkogården
- Military career
- Allegiance: Sweden
- Branch: Swedish Navy
- Service years: 1917–1958
- Rank: Vice Admiral
- Commands: HSwMS Valrossen; HSwMS Draken; HSwMS Ulven; HSwMS Gotland; HSwMS Tapperheten; Royal Swedish Naval Academy; Inspector of the Torpedo and Submarine Service; Flag captain; South Coast Naval District; Naval Command South

Vice Admiral Johan Erik Samuelson (16 April 1893 – 15 December 1964) was a senior Swedish Navy officer. Samuelson's senior postings includes as flag captain (1943–1945), as Commander-in-Chief of the Coastal Fleet (1946–1950), and Commanding Admiral of the Naval Command South (1950–1958).

== Early life ==
Samuelson was born on 16 April 1893 at Ekedal Estate in Hyringa socken, Grästorp Municipality, Skaraborg County, Sweden, the son of Johan Samuelson and his wife Augusta Modh. He was brother of hippologist Frans Oscar Samuelson (born 1876). Erik Samuelson passed studentexamen in Vänersborg in 1911. He spent some time as an engineer student on the Swedish East Asian Company's steamship Ceylon during a trip to East Asia. He also had some time employment at a shipyard in Le Havre.

== Career ==
=== Military career ===
Samuelson graduated from the Royal Swedish Naval Academy in 1915 and was commissioned as a second lieutenant the same year. He was promoted to sub-lieutenant in 1917, attended naval mine school the same year. He then took part in the minesweeping, which during the ongoing world war in the summer and autumn of 1918 was carried out in the Kattegat to enable people to carry out vital fishing even outside Swedish territorial waters. In particular, the division of three old torpedo boats, to which Samuelson belonged, did a very meritorious job in the German minefields. The Vasa Medal in gold that Samuelson held was awarded to him after the end of this minesweeping. Samuelson then attended a telegraphy course in 1919 and submarine school from 1919 to 1920. Samuelson then attended the French Navy torpedo school in Toulon from 1920 to 1921. Samuelson served in the submarine service between 1921 and 1933, among other things as submarine and division commander. During this time he also captained patrol boats and torpedo boats. Samuelson also served aboard coastal defence ships and the cruiser HSwMS Fylgia during a trip to the Caribbean. He attended the general course and the staff course at the Royal Swedish Naval Staff College from 1921 to 1923 and served as flag lieutenant (flaggadjutant) in the staff of the Coastal Fleet from 1924 to 1928. From 1926 to 1928 he was a substitute teacher in naval art at the Royal Swedish Naval Academy. Promoted to lieutenant in 1928, Samuelson served as adjutant in the commandant staff in Karlskrona from 1933 to 1934 and in the Naval Staff from 1934 to 1937, including as head of the Aviation Department from 1936 to 1937. Samuelson was then posted as naval attaché in Rome, Italy from 1936 to 1937.

Samuelson served as a teacher in tactics at the Royal Swedish Naval Staff College from 1936 to 1939 and was promoted to lieutenant commander in 1937. In 1938, he served as commanding officer of the cruiser HSwMS Gotland and the coastal defence ship HSwMS Tapperheten. Samuelson was head of the Royal Swedish Naval Academy from 1937 to 1943. There he made a great profit from producing and arranging for the school to move from the old premises on Skeppsholmen to the new establishment at the Näsby Castle area. In connection with this, he organized a uniform and effective practical training for all categories of future officers in the navy. Samuelson was promoted to commander in 1940 and to captain in 1942. Samuelson served for a few months in 1943 as the Inspector of the Torpedo and Submarine Service (Inspektör för torped och ubåtsvapnet) and the same year he served as flag captain. Samuelson was promoted to rear admiral in 1945 and was appointed Commander-in-Chief of the Coastal Fleet the same year. Five years later, in 1950, he assumed the position of Commanding Admiral of the South Coast Naval District, which became Naval Command South in 1957. Samuelson retired and was given a tombstone promotion to vice admiral in 1958.

Samuelson has written essays in journals and been a contributor to Marinlitteraturföreningen ("Naval Literature Association"). He was also vice chairman of the Swedish Association of Army, Navy and Air Force Officers (Svenska officersförbundet) from 1943 to 1944.

=== Retirement ===
After Samuelson retired, his vast experience concerning seafarers and their conditions was used within the Föreningen för skandinaviska sjömanshem i utländska hamnar ("Association of Scandinavian Seamen's Homes in Foreign Ports"). This position of trust interested him very much. In order to better assess the issues that could come up during his trial, he visited in 1963 as chairman of the Swedish branch of the association several of the sailors' homes in southern and western Europe. Samuelson was elected to the Royal Swedish Society of Naval Sciences 1931 and became an honorary member in 1945. During the years 1950-1958 he serves as its president. He was elected to the Royal Swedish Academy of War Sciences in 1942 and serves as its president from 1959 to 1961.

== Personal life ==
In 1926, Samuelson married Marianne Gullberg (1903–1995), the daughter of consul general Herman Gullberg and Gunborg Sjöstrand. They had two children: Gustaf (born 1927) and Anne (born 1929).

== Death ==
Samuelson died on 15 December 1964 in Ingarö. He was buried at Galärvarvskyrkogården in Stockholm on 22 December 1964.

== Dates of rank ==
- 1915 – Second lieutenant
- 1917 – Sub-lieutenant
- 1928 – Lieutenant
- 1937 – Lieutenant commander
- 1940 – Commander
- 1942 – Captain
- 1945 – Rear admiral
- 1958 – Vice admiral

== Awards and decorations ==
=== Swedish ===
- (Sweden) Commander Grand Cross of the Order of the Sword
- (Sweden) Knight of the Order of the Sword (1936)
- (Sweden) Knight of the Order of the Polar Star (1943)
- (Sweden) Vasa Medal in gold, 8th size (1918)

=== Foreign ===
- (Denmark) Commander 1st Class of the Order of the Dannebrog
- (Denmark) Knight of the Order of the Dannebrog (1926)
- Commander of the Order of the Crown of Italy (1941)
- (Nazi Germany) 2nd CLass of the Order of the German Eagle (1937)
- Knight 1st Class of the Order of the White Rose of Finland
- Knight of the Order of the White Rose of Finland (1925)

== Honours ==
- Member of the Royal Swedish Society of Naval Sciences (1931; honorary member in 1945; president 1950–1958)
- Member of the Royal Swedish Academy of War Sciences (1942; president 1959–1961)

Military offices
Preceded by Gustaf Hamilton	Inspector of the Torpedo and Submarine Service; 1943–1943	Succeeded by ?
Preceded by Helge Bager	Royal Swedish Naval Academy; 1937–1943	Succeeded by Jens Stefenson
Preceded by Erik Anderberg	Flag captain 1943–1945	Succeeded by John Wirström
Preceded by Yngve Ekstrand	Commander-in-Chief of the Coastal Fleet; 1946–1950	Succeeded by Stig H:son Ericson
Preceded by Gösta Ehrensvärd	South Coast Naval District/Naval Command South; 1950–1958	Succeeded by Sigurd Lagerman
Professional and academic associations
Preceded by Gösta Ehrensvärd	President of the Royal Swedish Society of Naval Sciences; 1950–1958	Succeeded by Sigurd Lagerman
Preceded by Ivar Gewert	President of the Royal Swedish Academy of War Sciences; 1959–1961	Succeeded by Rudolf Kolmodin
