= Helge Strömbäck =

Swedish Navy officer

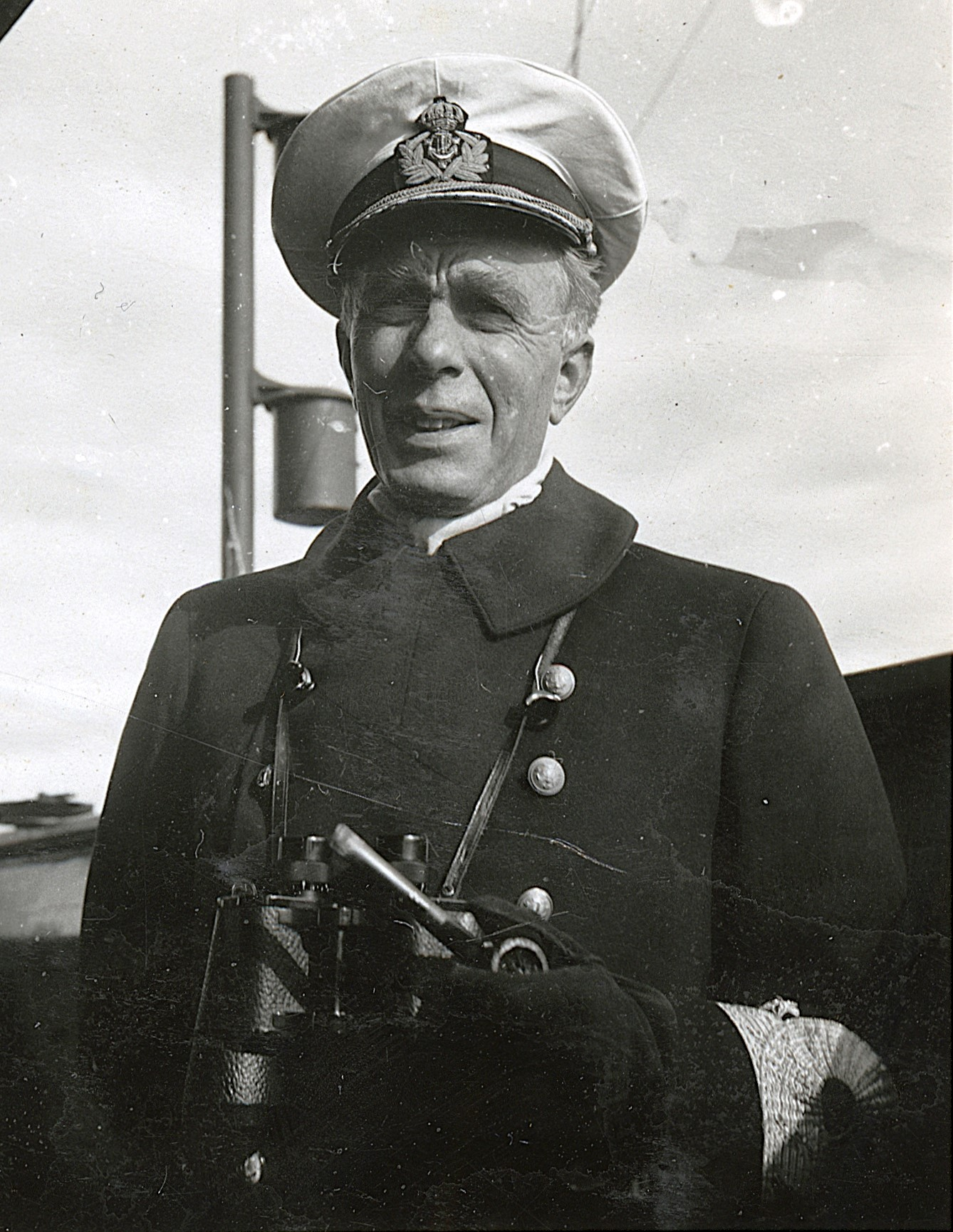
- Vice Admiral Helge Strömbäck in 1945.
- Born: Helge Hjalmar Immanuel Strömbäck; 26 July 1889; Delsbo, Sweden
- Died: 20 March 1960 (aged 70); Stockholm, Sweden
- Burial place: Galärvarvskyrkogården, Stockholm
- Military career
- Branch: Swedish Navy
- Service years: 1903–1953
- Rank: Vice Admiral
- Commands: HSwMS Nordenskjöld; HSwMS Gotland; Naval Operations Department, Defence Staff; Flag captain; Chief of the Naval Staff; Chief of the Navy

Vice Admiral Helge Hjalmar Immanuel Strömbäck (26 July 1889 – 20 March 1960) was a Swedish Navy officer. He was the Chief of the Naval Staff from 1942 to 1945 and the Chief of the Navy from 1945 to 1953.

== Early life ==
Strömbäck was born on 26 July 1889 in Delsbo, Gävleborg County, Sweden, the son of vicar Hjalmar Strömbäck and his wife Ida (née Steinmetz). He became a sea cadet in 1903.

== Career ==
Strömbäck became a sub-lieutenant in the Swedish Navy in 1909. Strömbäck conducted Russian language studies in Moscow from 1913 to 1914 and was promoted to lieutenant in 1918. He attended the Royal Swedish Naval Staff College from 1918 to 1921 and was a teacher there and at the Royal Swedish Army Staff College. Strömbäck was secretary of the 1929 Defense Investigation and expert assistance in the 1930 Defence Commission. Strömbäck was promoted to commander in 1933 and was head of department at the Naval Staff from 1933 to 1936.

He was captain of the seaplane cruiser HSwMS Gotland in 1936 and then head of the Naval Operations Department in the Defence Staff from 1937 to 1939. Strömbäck was promoted to captain in 1939 and served as flag captain from 1939 to 1941 and Chief of the Naval Staff from 1942 to 1945. He was promoted to rear admiral in 1943 and finally vice admiral in 1945. Strömbäck was Chief of the Navy from 1945 to 1953.

== Personal life ==
In 1921, Strömbäck married Melanie Suchy (1892–1981). He was the father of Melanie (born 1922), Gudrun (born 1925) and Barbro (born 1927).

== Death ==
Strömbäck died on 20 March 1960 in Stockholm. The funeral service was held on 29 March 1960 in Skeppsholmen Church in Stockholm. He was interred on 31 March 1960 at Galärvarvskyrkogården in Stockholm.

== Dates of rank ==
- 28 October 1909 – Acting Sub-Lieutenant (Underlöjtnant)
- 31 October 1913 – Sub-lieutenant
- 6 December 1918 – Lieutenant
- 12 December 1933 – Lieutenant commander
- 1 April 1937 – Commander
- 1 April 1939 – Captain
- 1 October 1943 – Rear admiral
- 1 April 1945 – Vice admiral

== Awards and decorations ==
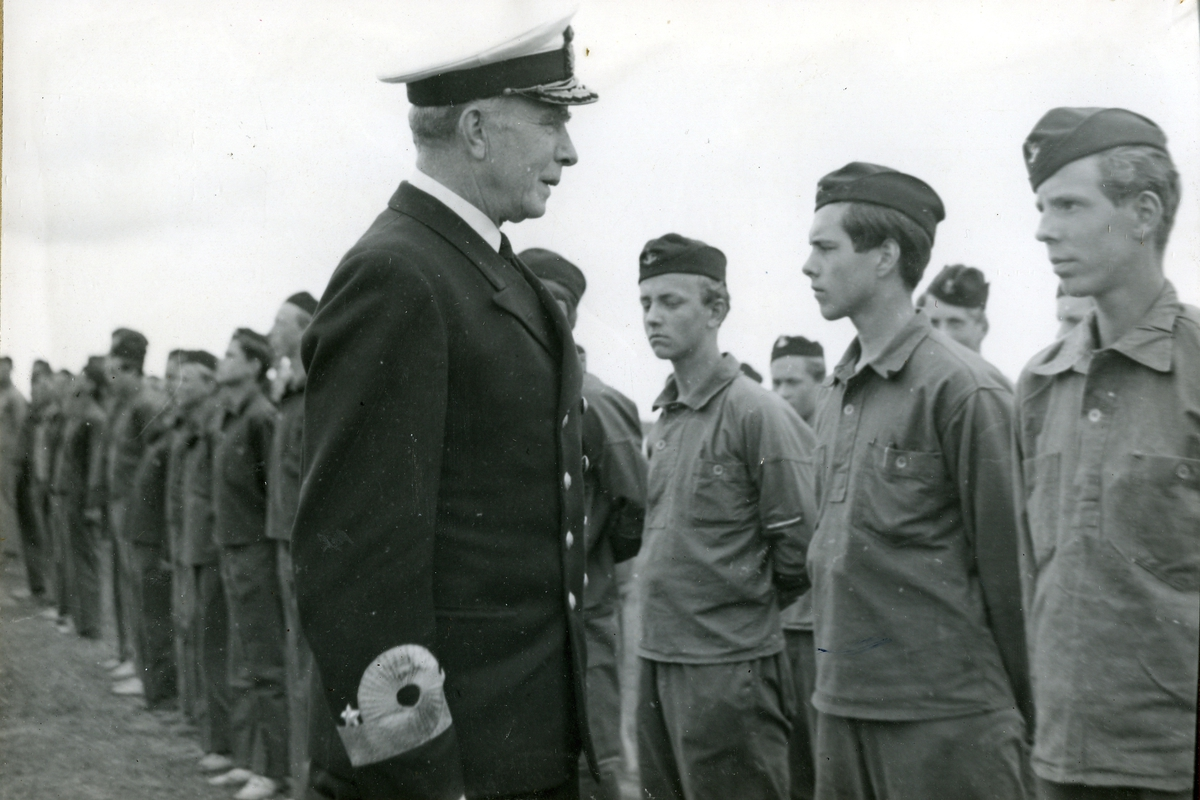
Vice Admiral Strömbäck inspects the Swedish Auxiliary Naval Corps' cadet school at Dalarö Fortress circa 1950.

=== Swedish ===
- (Sweden) King Gustaf V's Jubilee Commemorative Medal (1948)
- (Sweden) Commander Grand Cross of the Order of the Sword (6 June 1945)
- (Sweden) Commander 1st Class of the Order of the Sword (6 June 1944)
- (Sweden) Knight of the Order of the Sword (1930)
- (Sweden) Knight of the Order of the Polar Star (1935)
- (Sweden) Knight of the Order of Vasa (1926)

=== Foreign ===
- (Brazil) Grand Officer of the Order of Naval Merit (before 1950)
- (Chile) Grand Cross of the Order of Merit (before 1955)
- (Denmark) Grand Cross of the Order of the Dannebrog (before 1947)
- (Denmark) Knight of the Order of the Dannebrog (before 1931)
- (Finland) 1st Class of the Order of the Cross of Liberty with a star and swords (before 1950)
- Commander 1st Class of the Order of the White Rose of Finland
- Commander 2nd Class of the Order of the White Rose of Finland (before 1940)
- Knight 1st Class of the Order of the White Rose of Finland (before 1931)
- (France) Grand Officer of the Legion of Honour (before 1955)
- (Mexico) Commander 1st Class of the Order of the Aztec Eagle (before 1940)
- (Netherlands) Officer of the Order of Orange-Nassau with swords (before 1940)
- (Norway) Grand Cross of the Order of St. Olav (1 July 1947)
- (Poland) Grand Cross of the Order of Polonia Restituta (before 1947)
- (Poland) Officer of the Order of Polonia Restituta (before 1940)
- (Spain) Knight of the Cross of Naval Merit (before 1931)
- (Nazi Germany) 1st Class of the Order of the German Eagle (before 1942)
- (Venezuela) Grand Officer of the Order of the Liberator (before 1947)

== Honours ==
- Member of the Royal Swedish Academy of War Sciences (1939)
- Honorary member of the Royal Swedish Society of Naval Sciences (1943)

== Bibliography ==
- Strömbäck, Helge (1936). Sverige och Östersjön: en försvarspolitisk studie [Sweden and the Baltic Sea: a defense policy study]. Marinlitteraturföreningen, 0348-2405; 40 (in Swedish). Stockholm: Fritzes bokförl.

Military offices
Preceded by None	Defence Staff's Naval Operations Department; 1937–1939	Succeeded by Stig H:son Ericson
Preceded by Yngve Ekstrand	Flag captain 1939–1941	Succeeded by Erik Anderberg
Preceded by Yngve Ekstrand	Chief of the Naval Staff; 1942–1945	Succeeded by Erik Anderberg
Preceded by Fabian Tamm	Chief of the Navy; 1945–1953	Succeeded by Stig H:son Ericson
Professional and academic associations
Preceded by Bengt Nordenskiöld	President of the Royal Swedish Academy of War Sciences; 1949–1951	Succeeded by Birger Hedqvist
