= Hans Simonsson (Swedish Navy officer) =

Swedish Navy officer (1880–1965)

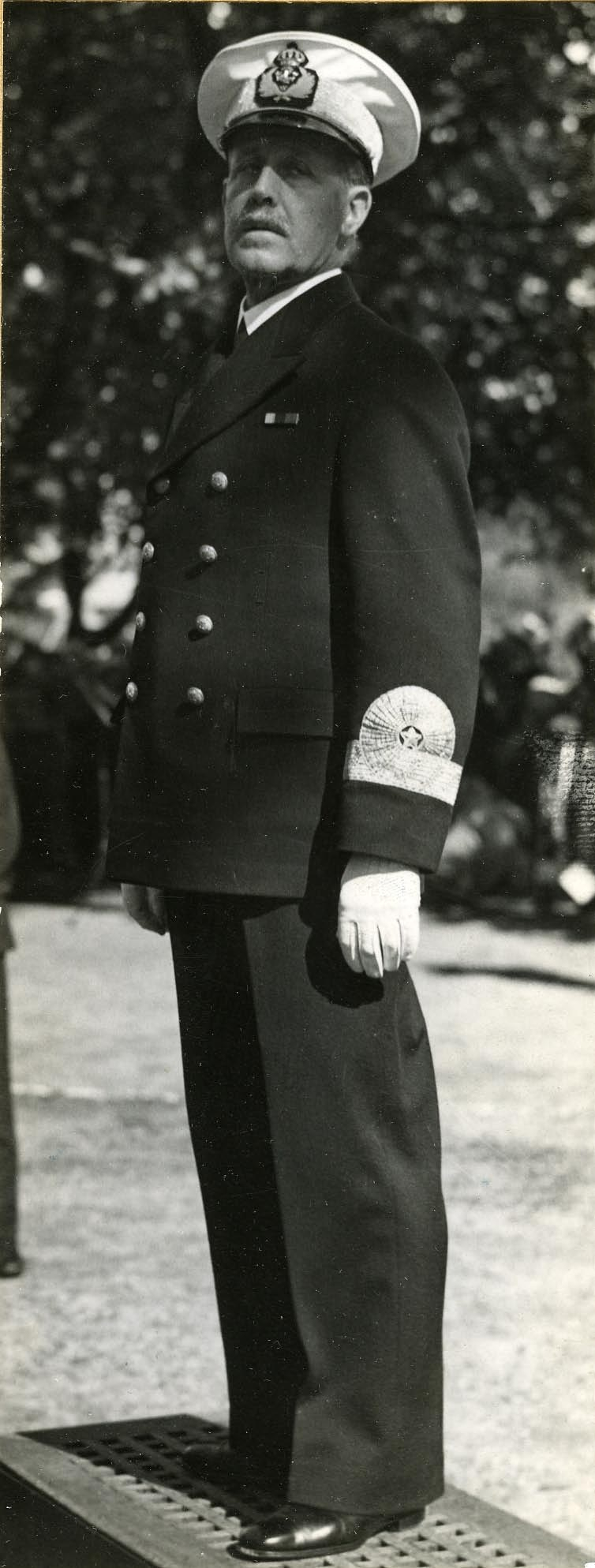
- Born: Hans Viktor Simonsson; 3 August 1880; Holm, Sweden
- Died: 16 July 1965 (aged 84); Stockholm, Sweden
- Burial place: Galärvarvskyrkogården, Stockholm
- Military career
- Branch: Swedish Navy
- Service years: 1901–1945
- Rank: Vice Admiral
- Commands: HSwMS Hvalen; HSwMS Svärdfisken; Inspector of the Submarine Service; Flag captain; Military Office of the Naval Defence; South Coast Naval District; East Coast Naval District

Vice Admiral Hans Viktor Simonsson (3 August 1880 – 16 July 1965) was a senior Swedish Navy officer. He served as head of the Military Office of the Naval Defence (1933–1938) and as Commanding Admiral of the South Coast Naval District (1938–1942) and of the East Coast Naval District (1942–1945). Simonsson was one of the founders of the Swedish Submarine Service.

== Early life ==
Simonsson was born on 3 August 1880 in Holm Parish, Mellerud Municipality, Sweden, the son of Viktor Simonsson, a traffic director, and his wife Hanna Forssman. Simonsson became a sea cadet in 1895.

== Career ==
Simonsson was commissioned as a naval officer in 1901 with the rank of underlöjtnant. He underwent submarine school in 1907 on Sweden's first submarine, Hajen which was completed in 1904 and delivered in 1905 delivered. Then followed many years of commands of ships and division commander on submarines of various types. He attended the Royal Swedish Naval Staff College from 1907 to 1909 and served as adjutant there between 1909 and 1913. Simonsson was commander of the submarines number 2 and 3 during the years 1909 and 1910 and division and ship commander of the submarine Hvalen from 1912 to 1914, during which time he was also head of "Stockholm's Submarine Contingency". In 1913 he was sent to La Spezia, Italy to take part in trials with Fiat-type submarines.

During the entire World War I, or the years 1914–1918, he was division and ship commander on the submarine Svärdfisken, a naval command that uninterrupted lasted for forty-seven months. In 1914 he also assisted in certain investigations concerning the navy and was later that year appointed a member of a commission to investigate the question of the choice of new submarine types. He also published his opinions and assessments regarding the requirements for submarine types suitable for the Swedish Navy in print (1916). He was also an expert on the Submarine Service in the Swedish Defence Commission (Försvarsberedningen) in 1914 and in the committee in 1914 and 1916. His great tactical as well as ship and weapon technical insights were also used when it came to the choice and construction of Swedish submarine classes from Hajen II to Sjölejonet.

Simonsson was head of the Torpedo Department in Karlskrona from 1919 to 1923 and was promoted to lieutenant commander in 1920. He was made a member of the Royal Swedish Naval Materiel Administration and appointed head of its Torpedo Department in 1923, serving in this position until 1929, during which time he was promoted to commander in 1925. He served as Inspector of the Submarine Service from 1928 to 1933 and was promoted to captain in 1931. Simonsson then served as flag captain from 1932 to 1933 and as head of the Military Office of the Naval Defence (Sjöförsvarets kommandoexpedition) from 1933 to 1938. He was promoted to rear admiral in 1938 and was appointed Commanding Admiral of the South Coast Naval District in 1938, serving until 1942. During this time, Simonsson also served as president of the Royal Swedish Society of Naval Sciences (1939–1942) and as chairman of the Committee on the Status and Organization of the Swedish Coastal Artillery in 1940. He was Commanding Admiral of the East Coast Naval District from 1942 to 1945 when he retired and was promoted to vice admiral.

== Personal life ==
In 1912, Simonsson married Märta Margareta (Greta) Holm (1890–1971), the daughter of slottsfogde, captain Carl Holm and Märta Brunau. He was the father of Lennart Simonsson (1913–1993), Director General of the National Swedish Authority for Testing, Inspection and Metrolog between 1964 and 1971, and Lars Simonsson (1916–1990), Justice in the Supreme Administrative Court of Sweden between 1967 and 1983.

== Death ==
Simonsson died on 16 July 1965 and was interred on 24 July 1965 at Galärvarvskyrkogården in Stockholm.

== Dates of rank ==
- 1901 – Underlöjtnant
- 1903 – Sub-lieutenant
- 1910 – Lieutenant
- 1920 – Lieutenant commander
- 1925 – Commander
- 1931 – Captain
- 1936 – Rear admiral
- 1945 – Vice admiral

== Awards and decorations ==
=== Swedish ===
- (Sweden) Commander Grand Cross of the Order of the Sword (15 November 1945)
- (Sweden) Commander 1st Class of the Order of the Sword (15 November 1937)
- (Sweden) Knight 1st Class of the Order of the Sword (1922)
- (Sweden) Knight of the Order of the Polar Star (1933)
- (Sweden) Knight 1st Class of the Order of Vasa (1925)

=== Foreign ===
- (Poland) Grand Cross of the Order of Polonia Restituta (between 1945 and 1947)
- (Poland) Commander of the Order of Polonia Restituta (between 1931 and 1940)
- (Nazi Germany) Order of the German Eagle with Star (between 1937 and 1940)
- (Denmark) Commander of the Order of the Dannebrog (between 1925 and 1931)
- Commander of the Order of the White Rose of Finland (between 1931 and 1940)
- (Italy) Knight of the Order of Saints Maurice and Lazarus (between 1909 and 1915)

== Honours ==
- Member of the Royal Swedish Academy of War Sciences (1931)
- Member of the Royal Swedish Society of Naval Sciences (1917)
- Honorary member of the Royal Swedish Society of Naval Sciences (1938)

Military offices
Preceded by Charles de Champs	Inspector of the Submarine Service; 1938–1933	Succeeded by Helge Friis
Preceded by Fabian Tamm	Flag captain 1932–1933	Succeeded by Gösta Ehrensvärd
Preceded by Fabian Tamm	Military Office of the Naval Defence; 1933–1938	Succeeded by Marc Giron
Preceded by Gunnar Bjurner	South Coast Naval District; 1938–1942	Succeeded by Gösta Ehrensvärd
Preceded by Claës Lindsström	East Coast Naval District; 1942–1945	Succeeded by Yngve Ekstrand
Professional and academic associations
Preceded by Gunnar Bjurner	President of the Royal Swedish Society of Naval Sciences; 1938–1942	Succeeded by Gösta Ehrensvärd
