= Claës Lindsström =

Swedish Navy officer (1876–1964)

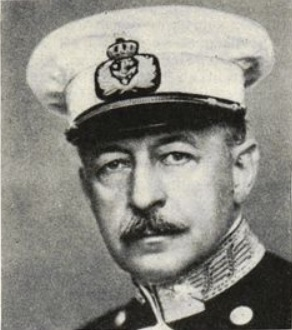
- Born: 8 October 1876; Visby, Sweden
- Died: 3 January 1964 (aged 87); Danderyd, Sweden
- Burial place: Norra begravningsplatsen
- Military career
- Allegiance: Sweden
- Branch: Swedish Navy
- Service years: 1890–1942
- Rank: Vice Admiral
- Nickname: Claës Olof Lindsström
- Commands: Torpedo Boat no. 81; HSwMS Vidar; HSwMS Fylgia; HSwMS Drottning Victoria; Flag captain; Royal Swedish Naval Staff College; Karlskrona Naval Station; Commandant of Karlskrona Fortress; South Coast Naval District; Chief of the Naval Staff; Stockholm Naval Station; East Coast Naval District

Vice Admiral Claës Olof Lindsström (8 October 1876 – 3 January 1964) was a Swedish Navy officer. Lindsström's senior commands include postings as commanding officer of Karlskrona and Stockholm Naval Stations, the South and East Coast Naval District, and as Chief of the Naval Staff. Lindsström was active during the era of the Sverige-class coastal defence ships and made significant efforts to develop this type of coastal defence ship.

== Early life ==
Lindsström was born on 8 October 1876 in Visby, Sweden, the son of Victor Olof Lindsström, a wholesaler, and his wife Sophia Antonia Söderberg. He was a cadet at the Royal Swedish Naval Academy in 1890 and was the youngest and at the top of his class who graduated in 1896. He then went on to the Royal Swedish Naval Staff College in 1902 in the usual order and graduated in 1904 with the highest grades, which up to that point had ever been awarded.

== Career ==
Lindsström captained his first ship, the torpedo boat no. 81, in 1904. He served in the Artillery Department at the Royal Swedish Naval Materiel Administration from 1904 to 1907. He was a weapons teacher at the Royal Swedish Naval Academy from 1905 to 1910 and during his numerous tours at sea, Lindsström was, among other things, flag lieutenant (flaggadjutant) on eight different expeditions between 1905 and 1913. Lindsström became a member and secretary of the Naval Warfare Materiel Committee (Sjökrigsmaterielkommittén) in 1906 and served as adjutant to the Inspector of the Navy's Exercises at Sea, Rear Admiral Wilhelm Dyrssen, from 1907 to 1910. From 1910 to 1912, he served in the High Seas Fleet of the Imperial German Navy and in 1913 he was appointed Adjutant to His Majesty the King Gustaf V (Chief Adjutant in 1925). Lindsström served from 1913 to 1914 in an Advisory Study (Försvarsberedning) and from 1917 to 1919 as a naval attaché in Berlin and Copenhagen. He was also a member of the Swedish Naval Studies Commission which, in the autumn of 1917, visited Germany with the main residence in the Flanders area occupied by the German Army (Zeebrugge-Ostend). The results of this Commission's report contributed, among other things, to a large extent to the introduction of new firing rules and effective fire control devices on the Sverige-class coastal defence ships.

Lindsström then served as head of the Operations Department in the Naval Staff from 1919 to 1925 and as a teacher of strategy in the Royal Swedish Naval Staff College from 1919 to 1924. Lindsström served as captain of the armoured cruiser HSwMS Fylgia during a voyage around South America from 1922 to 1923 and as captain of the coastal defence ship HSwMS Drottning Victoria in 1924. He was commanding officer of the Winter Squadron (Vintereskadern) in 1926 and served as flag captain in the staff of the Coastal Fleet from 1925 to 1930 as well as head of the Royal Swedish Naval Staff College from 1930 to 1933. In 1932 he was commanding officer of the Submarine Division and from 1933 to 1939, Lindsström served as a naval expert in Sweden's delegation at the League of Nations' Geneva Disarmament Conference. He was commanding admiral and station commander in Karlskrona from 1933 to 1936 and Chief of the Naval Staff also in 1936. Lindsström served as station commander in Stockholm from 1936 to 1937 and was military member of the Supreme Court of Sweden from 1937. He then served as commanding admiral of the East Coast Naval District from 1937 to 1942 when he retired from the navy.

During his career, Lindsström published a number of books, for example Lärobok i elektricitetslära (together with J. Eklund, 1903), Maritima operationsbaser (1905), Lärobok i artilleri för K. sjökrigsskolan (1908), and Världsisläran, en bro mellan vetenskap och myt (1935). He also wrote a variety of minor essays and brochures on naval military issues.

== Later career ==
After retiring from the navy, Lindsström worked for the shipping company Rederi AB Nordstjernan in Stockholm from 1942 to 1948. In 1950, he left his position as military member of the Supreme Court. Later he was chairman of the Swedish Archipelago Association (Svenska Skärgårdsförbundet). In this capacity he presented proposals on the arrangement of the communications in the Stockholm archipelago.

== Personal life ==
On 1 September 1919 he married Hertha von Koerner (22 October 1883 in Dresden – 6 December 1983), the daughter of Geheimrat Paul von Koerner, J.D., and Margarete Wahle.

== Death ==
Lindsström died on 3 January 1964 in Danderyd Parish. He was interred on 18 January 1964 at Norra begravningsplatsen in Stockholm. His wife Hertha is also buried here.

== Dates of rank ==
- 1896 – Acting sub-lieutenant
- 1900 – Sub-lieutenant
- 1904 – Lieutenant
- 1917 – Lieutenant commander
- 1919 – Commander
- 1925 – Captain
- 1932 – Rear admiral
- 1942 – Vice admiral

== Awards and decorations ==
=== Swedish ===
- (Sweden) King Gustaf V's Jubilee Commemorative Medal (1948)
- (Sweden) King Gustaf V's Jubilee Commemorative Medal (1928)
- (Sweden) Commander Grand Cross of the Order of the Sword (6 June 1940)
- (Sweden) Commander 1st Class of the Order of the Sword (6 June 1932)
- (Sweden) Commander 2nd Class of the Order of the Sword (6 June 1929)
- (Sweden) Knight 1st Class of the Order of the Sword (1917)
- (Sweden) Knight of the Order of the Polar Star (1925)
- (Sweden) Knight 1st Class of the Order of Vasa (1914)
- (Sweden) Medal for Noble Deeds in gold

=== Foreign ===
- (Denmark) Grand Cross of the Order of the Dannebrog (between 1931 and 1940)
- (Denmark) Commander 2nd Class of the Order of the Dannebrog (between 1915 and 1921)
- (Denmark) Knight of the Order of the Dannebrog (before 1915)
- (Norway) Grand Cross of the Order of St. Olav (between 1931 and 1940)
- (Norway) Commander 1st Class of the Order of St. Olav (between 1925 and 1931)
- (Latvia) Grand Officer of the Order of the Three Stars (between 1925 and 1931)
- (Poland) Commander 1st Class of the Order of Polonia Restituta (between 1931 and 1940)
- (Spain) Commander 1st Class of the Crosses of Naval Merit (between 1925 and 1931)
- (Chile) 2nd Class of the Order of Merit (between 1921 and 1925)
- Commander 2nd Class of the Order of the White Rose of Finland (between 1921 and 1925)
- Commander of the Order of the Sun of Peru (between 1921 and 1925)
- (Grand Duchy of Baden) Knight 1st Class of the Order of the Zähringer Lion with oak leaves (between 1915 and 1921)
- (France) Knight of the Legion of Honour (before 1915)
- (Italy) Knight of the Order of Saints Maurice and Lazarus (before 1915)
- (Kingdom of Prussia) 2nd Class of the Iron Cross (before 1918)
- (Kingdom of Prussia) Knight 3rd Class of the Order of the Red Eagle (before 1915)
- (Kingdom of Prussia) Knight 3rd Class of the Order of the Crown (before 1915)
- (Russian Empire) Knight 3rd Class of the Order of Saint Anna (before 1915)

== Honours ==
- Member of the Royal Swedish Society of Naval Sciences (1912)
- Member of the Royal Swedish Academy of War Sciences (1923)
- Honorary member of the Royal Swedish Society of Naval Sciences (1932)

== Bibliography ==
- Lindsström, Claës (1956). Bragd och brott på haven (in Swedish). Stockholm: AWE/Geber. SELIBR 2133056.
- Lindsström, Claës (1951). Sjöfartens historia (in Swedish). Stockholm: Lindfors. SELIBR 1442272.
- Lindsström, Claës (1935). Världsisläran: en bro mellan vetenskap och myt (in Swedish). Stockholm: Svea rike. SELIBR 1348117.
- Lindsström, Claës (1922). Sammandrag av Marinberedningens förslag till sjöförsvarets ordnande (in Swedish). Stockholm: Norstedt. SELIBR 1486881.
- Lindsström, Claës (1914). Flottan och "Karlskronalinjen" (in Swedish). Stockholm: Stockholms Dagblad. SELIBR 1636394.
- Lindsström, Claës (1908). Tabeller för räkneexempel i artilleri (in Swedish). Stockholm. SELIBR 2779898.
- Lindsström, Claës (1908). Lärobok i artilleri för K. sjökrigsskolan (in Swedish). Stockholm: Norstedts. SELIBR 1615461.
- Lindsström, Claës (1908). Lärobok i artilleri för Kungl. Sjökrigsskolan (in Swedish). Stockholm. SELIBR 2779897.
- Lindsström, Claës (1906). Lärobok i krutlära afsedd för K. sjökrigsskolan (in Swedish). Stockholm: Norstedts. SELIBR 1615462.
- Lindsström, Claës (1905). Maritima operationsbaser. Marinlitteraturföreningen, 0348-2405; 4 (in Swedish). Stockholm: Marinlitteraturföreningens förlag. SELIBR 1727688.
- Lindsström, Claës; Eklund, John Axel Fredrik (1903). Lärobok i elektricitetslära afsedd för undervisningen i exercisskolorna: enligt uppdrag utarbetad (in Swedish). Stockholm. SELIBR 2779899.
- Lindsström, Claës. Den bortglömda flottan (in Swedish). Stockholm. SELIBR 2779896.

Military offices
Preceded by Charles de Champs	Flag captain 1925–1930	Succeeded by Fabian Tamm
Preceded by Gunnar Unger	Royal Swedish Naval Staff College; 1930–1933	Succeeded by Nils Åkerblom
Preceded by Charles de Champs	Karlskrona Naval Station; Commandant of Karlskrona Fortress; South Coast Naval District; 1933–1936	Succeeded by Gunnar Bjurner
Preceded by Otto Lybeck	Chief of the Naval Staff; 1936–1936	Succeeded by Charles de Champs
Preceded by Charles de Champs	Stockholm Naval Station; 1936–1937	Succeeded by Halvar Söderbaum
Preceded by Charles de Champs	East Coast Naval District; 1936–1942	Succeeded by Hans Simonsson
Professional and academic associations
Preceded by Charles de Champs	Chairman of the Royal Swedish Society of Naval Sciences; 1934–1936	Succeeded by Gunnar Bjurner
