= East Coast Naval Base =

Former regional command for the Swedish Navy (1928-2004)

- Ostkustens marinbas
- Active: 1928–2004
- Country: Sweden
- Allegiance: Swedish Armed Forces
- Branch: Swedish Navy
- Type: Naval base
- Part of: Chief of the Navy (1928–1966); Eastern Military District (1966–1991); Middle Military District (1991–2000); Joint Forces Command (2000–2004)
- Garrison/HQ: Stockholm (1928–1966); Stockholm/Haninge (Muskö) (1966–2004)
- Colors: Yellow and blue
- March: "Amiral Wilhelm Dyrssen" (Emil Dahlström) (Note: The march was adopted on 30 June 1994 and established on 13 June 1996.)

Insignia
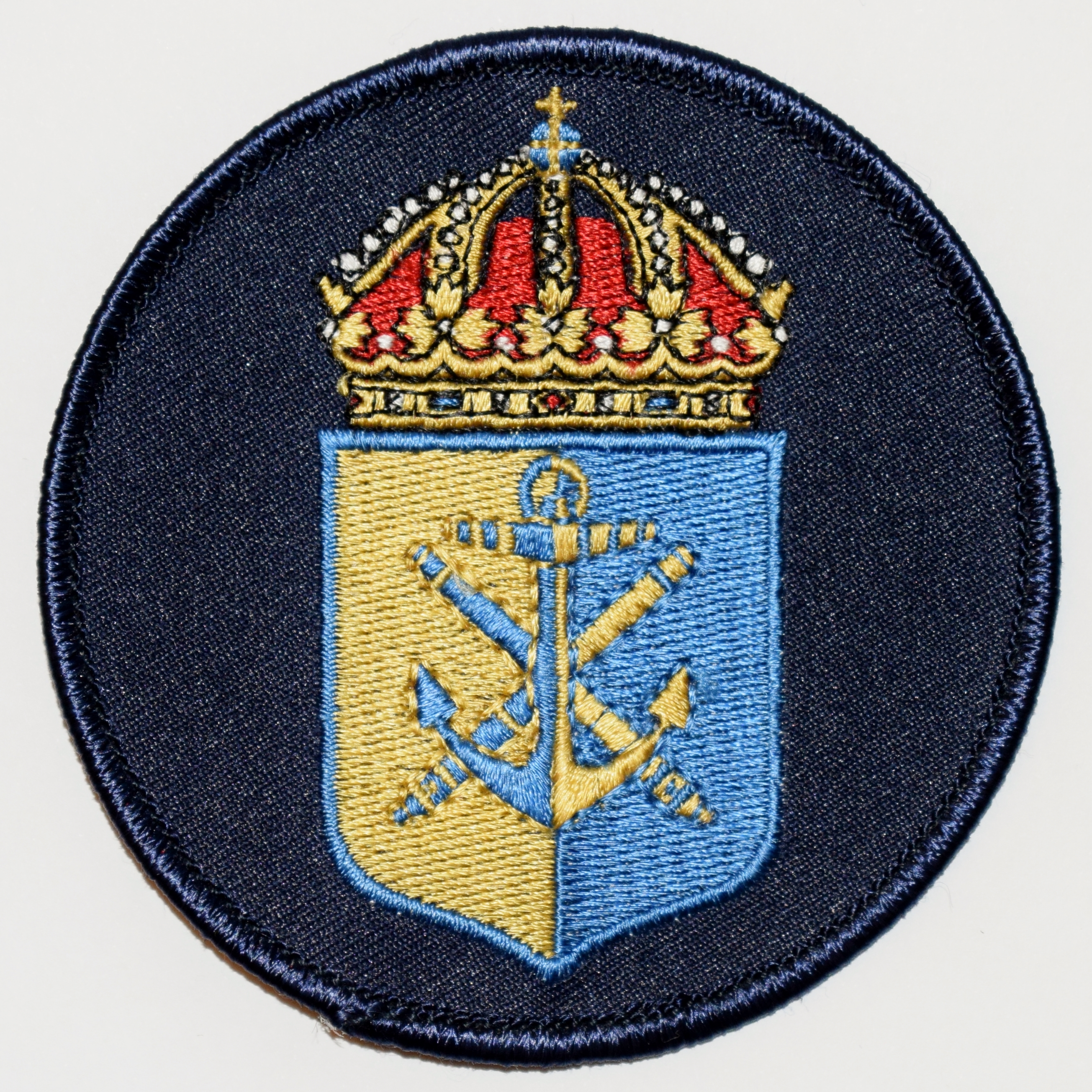
- Patch of the East Coast Naval Command

East Coast Naval Base (Swedish: Ostkustens marinbas, MarinB O) was a Swedish Navy command body which operated in various forms between the years 1928 and 2004. It was located in Stockholm from 1928 to 1966 and then in Haninge Municipality from 1966 to 2004.

== History ==
In accordance with the Defence Act of 1925, from 1928, six regional command and maintenance bodies for the Swedish Navy were organized within the respective coastal areas. During the 1930s, the regional naval structure was built in the form of naval districts (initially only in the war organization, but later in war as well as in peace). The East Coast Naval District (Ostkustens marindistrikt, MDO), based in Stockholm, stretched from Öregrundsgrepen, near Gräsö (Björn's Lighthouse) to the northern part of Kalmar Strait (Kråkelund). The naval districts replaced the naval stations and were upgraded in 1957 to naval commands (marinkommandon) and was given operational responsibility (higher regional level). From 1966 to 1990 they were called naval bases (örlogsbaser) and patrol areas (bevakningsområden). In 1966, new and from then on integrated military districts were established, which took over some of the tasks of the naval commands. Other tasks were transferred simultaneously to the newly established naval bases (lower regional level). During the period 1981-1990, the naval bases were amalgamated with respective coastal artillery defence and formed naval commands - now at a lower regional level. For East Coast Naval Base (Ostkustens örlogsbas, ÖrlB O), this meant that it was amalgamated with Stockholm Coastal Artillery Defense (Stockholms kustartilleriförsvar, SK) and formed the East Coast Naval Command (Ostkustens marinkommando, MKO).

The lower regional organization had command duties and was responsible for, among other things, maritime surveillance and maritime maintenance, base services. The majority of the regional structure was discontinued in 2000 and replaced with two naval bases and a naval shipyard. At the same time the Naval Tactical Command was established. The organization was formed on 1 July 2000 and took over certain parts of the operation after the East Coast Naval Command (Ostkustens marinkommando, MKO). The Naval Base was formed on 1 January 2005 after the Defence Act of 2004. The Naval Base took over the main tasks previously relinquished to the East Coast Naval Base (Ostkustens marinbas, MarinB O) and the South Coast Naval Base. Today, it is the Naval Base, which has in principle taken over the remaining naval tasks of the lower regional structure.

== Heraldry and traditions ==
=== Flag ===
The flag of the unit was a double swallow-tailed Swedish flag. The flag was presented to the then East Coast Naval Command (MKO) in 1976.

=== Coat of arms ===
The coat of the arms of the East Coast Naval Base (ÖrlB O) 1966–1990, East Coast Naval Command (MKO) 1990–2000 and the East Coast Naval Base (MarinB O) 2000–2004. Blazon: "Per pale or and azure charged with an anchor erect surmounted two gunbarrels of older pattern in saltire counterchanged".

=== Medals ===
In 2005, the Ostkustens marinbas minnesmedalj ("East Coast Naval Base Commemorative Medal) in silver (MarinBOMSM) was established. The medal ribbon is dark blue with a yellow stripe on each side.

=== Heritage ===
The traditions of the East Coast Naval Base and its predecessors are kept by the Naval Base.

== Commanding officers ==
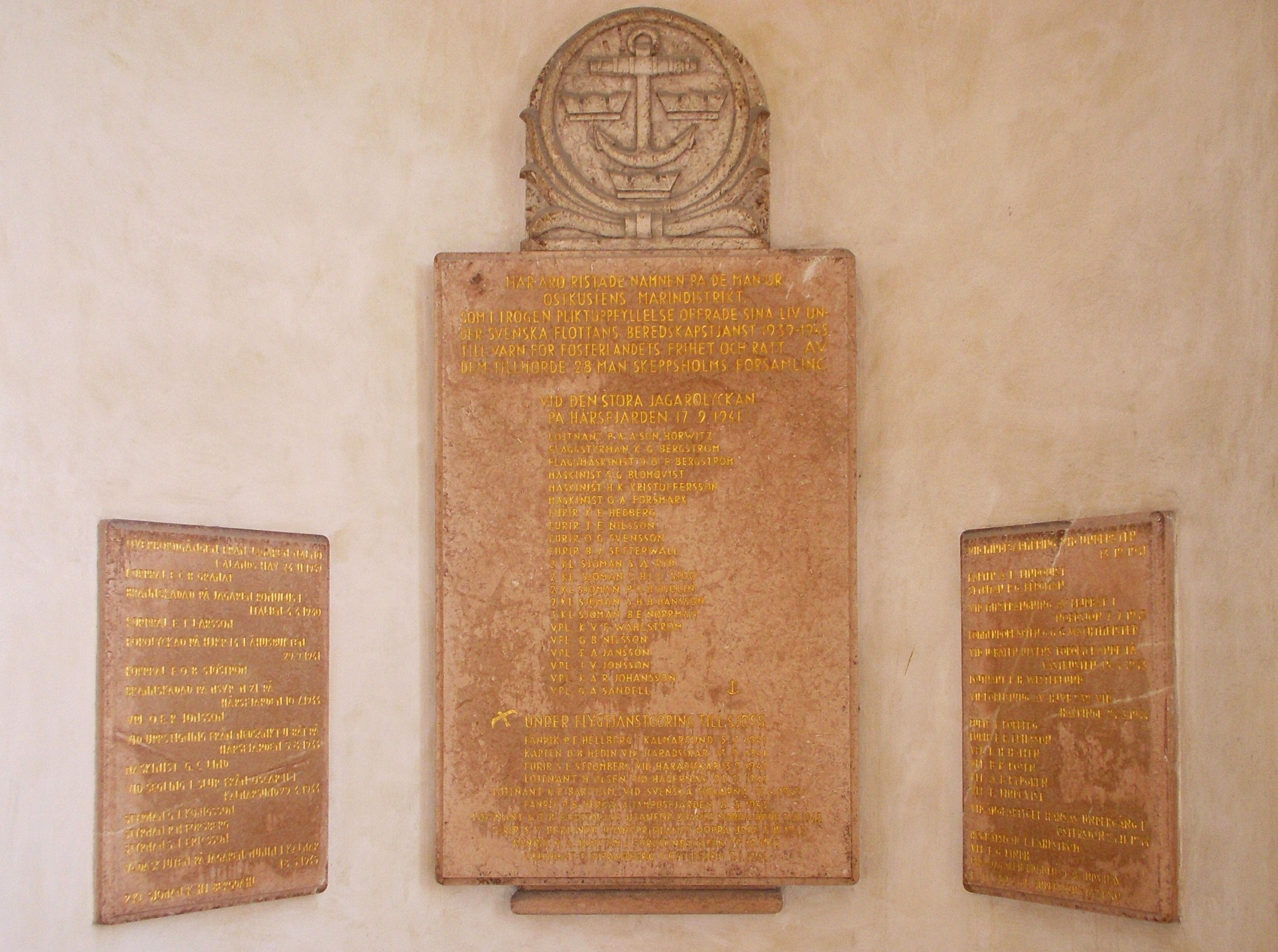
Skeppsholmen Church, memorial stones of the men from the East Coast Naval District, who sacrificed their lives during the Swedish Navy's preparedness services 1939-1945 (including Hårsfjärden disaster on 17 September 1941).

Commanding officers:

- 1933–1936: Charles de Champs
- 1936–1942: Claës Lindsström
- 1942–1945: Hans Simonsson
- 1945–1951: Yngve Ekstrand
- 1951–1957: Erik Anderberg
- 1957–1966: Erik af Klint
- 1966–1971: Einar Blidberg
- 1971–1977: Lars H:son Lundberg
- 1977–1983: Christer Kierkegaard
- 1983–1986: Bengt O'Konor
- 1986–1988: Hans Tynnerström
- 1988–1993: Gunnar-Bo Ericson
- 1993–1996: Gunnar Bengtsson
- 1996–2000: Ulf Edman
- 2000–2001: Björn Nordbeck
- 2001–2003: Rolf Brehmer
- 2003–2004: Claes-Göran Hagström

== Names, designations and locations ==
Name	Translation	From		To
Ostkustens marindistrikt	East Coast Naval District	1928-01-01	–	1957-09-30
Marinkommando Ost	Naval Command East	1957-10-01	–	1966-09-30
Ostkustens örlogsbas	East Coast Naval Base	1966-10-01	–	1990-06-30
Ostkustens marinkommando	East Coast Naval Command	1990-07-01	–	2000-06-30
Ostkustens marinbas	East Coast Naval Base; Naval Base East	2000-07-01	–	2004-12-31
Avvecklingsorganisation	Decommissioning Organisation	2005-01-01	–	2006-06-30
Designation		From		To
MDO		1928-01-01	–	1957-09-30
MKO		1957-10-01	–	1966-09-30
ÖrlB O		1966-10-01	–	1990-06-30
MKO		1990-07-01	–	2000-06-30
MarinB O		2000-07-01	–	2004-12-31
Location		From		To
Stockholm Garrison/Skeppsholmen		1928-01-01	–	1940-??-??
Haninge/Hårsfjärden		1940-??-??	–	1969-??-??
Haninge/Muskö Naval Base		1969-??-??	–	2006-06-30
