= Augustin Ehrensvärd (1887–1968) =

Swedish nobleman and civil servant

Count Augustin Ehrensvärd
- Born: 28 June 1887; Karlskrona, Sweden
- Died: 10 May 1968 (aged 80); Tosterup, Sweden
- Education: Uppsala University
- Occupation: Civil servant
- Spouse: Margaretha Lavinia Magdalena Armfeldt (m. 1929)
- Father: Carl August Ehrensvärd
- Relatives: Carl August Ehrensvärd (brother); Gösta Ehrensvärd (brother); Albert Ehrensvärd (uncle); Augustin Ehrensvärd (great-grandfather); Archibald Douglas (cousin)

Count Augustin Ehrensvärd (28 June 1887 – 10 May 1968) was a Swedish nobleman and civil servant. Ehrensvärd built a career in the Swedish civil service after studying at Uppsala University. He began in 1914 as an amanuensis in the Ministry of Ecclesiastical Affairs and rose through the ranks to become first administrative officer by 1921. He later held senior roles in government administration, including deputy director in the Royal Majesty's Chancery from 1936 to 1952. Alongside his main positions, he worked extensively on government committees and played a role in the Finland Committee during 1939–1945.

== Early life ==
Ehrensvärd was born on 28 June 1887 in Karlskrona, Sweden, the son of Admiral, Count Carl August Ehrensvärd (1858–1944) and his wife Baroness Lovisa Ulrika "Ulla" (née Thott). He was the brother of General Carl August Ehrensvärd (1892–1974) and Vice Admiral Gösta Ehrensvärd (1885–1973). Augustin Ehrensvärd, was, according to his brother the general, in fact the most talented of the three brothers. His great-grandfather was the fortress builder Augustin Ehrensvärd, his uncle was Albert Ehrensvärd and his cousin was Lieutenant General Archibald Douglas.

Ehrensvärd passed his matriculation examination (mogenhetsexamen) on 14 May 19045. He enrolled as a student at Uppsala University in 1906, completed a theological-philosophical examination (teol. fil.) there on 14 September 1907, earned his Bachelor of Theology on 14 December 1912, and received an administrative degree (kansliexamen) on 31 October 1914.

== Career ==
Ehrensvärd served as an amanuensis in the Ministry of Ecclesiastical Affairs from 12 November 1914. He was an amanuensis at the Office of the Chancellor of the Universities (Universitetskanslersexpeditionen) from 11 September 1916 to 31 December 1917. He became acting first administrative officer (kanslisekreterare), of the Ministry of Ecclesiastical Affairs on 1 January 1918, was appointed second administrative officer on 1 January 1920, and was promoted to first administrative officer on 10 June 1921.

He was secretary, expert adviser and member of committees, as well as an official in parliamentary committees from 1917 to 1918. He was a member of the executive committee of the National League of Sweden from 1927 to 1931 and he was acting deputy director (kansliråd) in 1929 and deputy director in the Royal Majesty's Chancery (Kunglig Majestäts kansli) in 1936. He was deputy director from 1939 to 1952.

Ehrensvärd was also secretary and administrative director of the Finland Committee (Finlandskommittén) from 1939 to 1940 and was a member of the Working Committee of the Finland Committee from 1941 to 1945.

== Personal life ==
On 21 May 1929 in Turku, he married Countess Margaretha Lavinia Magdalena Armfeldt (30 May 1899 – 13 December 1981), the daughter of Count August Magnus C:son Armfeldt, a Finnish managing director, and his wife Aina Constance Favorin. Ehrensvärd lived his last years in Glemmingebro in the south of Sweden.

== Death ==
Ehrensvärd died on 10 May 1968 at Tosterup Castle. He was buried 15 May 1968 at Tosterup Cemetery in Tosterup.

== Awards and decorations ==
- (Sweden) Commander of the Order of the Polar Star
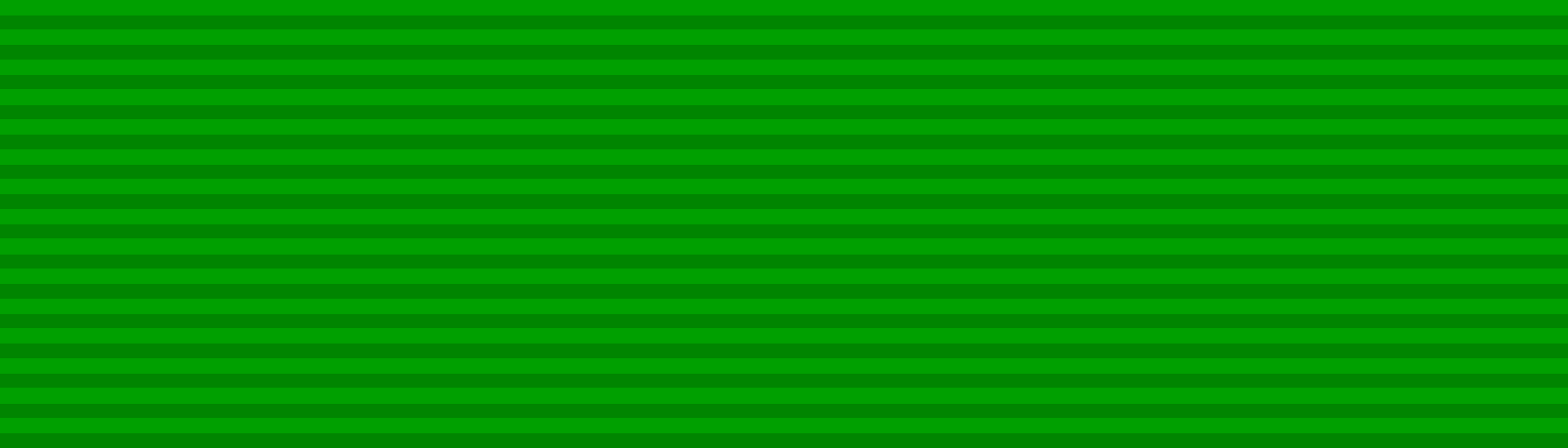
- (Sweden) Knight of the Order of Vasa
- (Denmark) Commander of the Order of the Dannebrog
- Commander of the Order of the White Rose of Finland
- (Finland) 2nd Class of the Order of the Cross of Liberty with swords
