= Carl August Ehrensvärd (1858–1944) =

Swedish Navy admiral, politician and Minister for Naval Affairs

Count Carl August Ehrensvärd
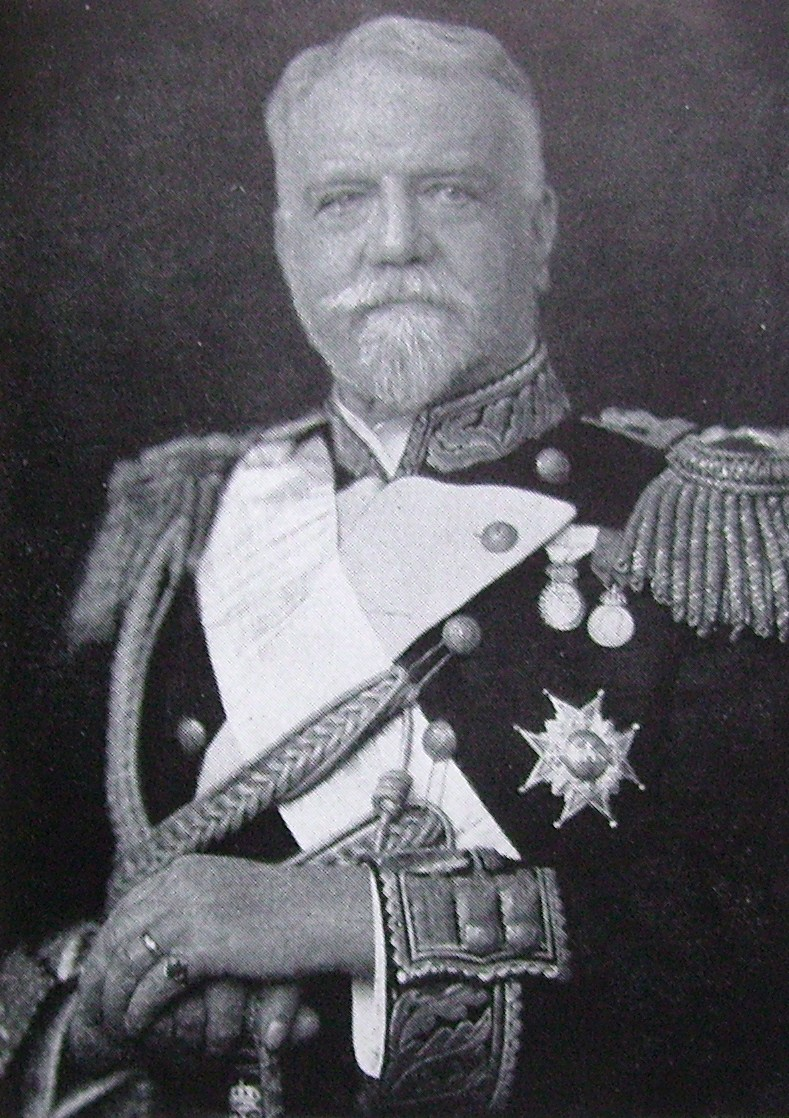
- Born: Carl August Ehrensvärd; 16 September 1858; Tosterup Castle, Sweden
- Died: 16 February 1944 (aged 85); Stockholm, Sweden
- Relatives: Carl August Ehrensvärd (son); Gösta Ehrensvärd (son); Augustin Ehrensvärd (son); Albert Ehrensvärd (brother)
- Military career
- Branch: Swedish Navy
- Service years: 1878–1923
- Rank: Admiral
- Commands: Flag captain Inspector of the Navy's Exercises at Sea; Highest Commander of the Coastal Fleet
- Other work: Minister for Naval Affairs (1907–10); Chief of His Majesty's Military Staff

Count Carl August Ehrensvärd (16 September 1858 – 16 February 1944) was a Swedish Navy admiral, politician and Minister for Naval Affairs from 1907 to 1911.

== Early life ==
Ehrensvärd was born on 16 September 1858 at Tosterup Castle, Tomelilla Municipality, Sweden, the son of County Governor Albert Ehrensvärd and his wife Ingeborg Hedvig Vogt (from Norway). He had fours siblings including Albert Ehrensvärd

== Career ==
He became underlöjtnant in the Swedish Navy in 1878 and lieutenant (kapten) in 1889. Ehrensvärd was promoted to lieutenant commander in 1900 and to commander in 1903. He was head of the Military Office of the Ministry for Naval Affairs from 1904 to 1906 and he was promoted to captain in 1905. Ehrensvärd was chief of the shipyard in Karlskrona in 1906 and Council of State (statsråd) and head of the Ministry for Naval Affairs from 4 December 1907 to 30 June 1910. Ehrensvärd then promoted to rear admiral in 1910 and appointed station commander in Stockholm. In 1916 he was appointed Inspector of the Navy's Exercises at Sea and the year after Ehrensvärd was promoted to vice admiral.

In 1919 Ehrensvärd was appointed Highest Commander of the Coastal Fleet and he was then commanding admiral and station commander in Karlskrona from 1919 to 1923. He was first adjutant of Gustaf V of Sweden and was appointed chief of His Majesty's Military Staff in 1924. Ehrensvärd was promoted to full admiral in 1926, three years after he retired from the navy.

== Personal life ==
In 1883 he married baroness Lovisa Ulrika (Ulla) Thott (born 3 August 1858), the daughter of ryttmästare, baron Gustav Thott and baroness Ulrika Thott. They had three sons: Carl August Ehrensvärd, Gösta Ehrensvärd and Augustin Ehrensvärd.

== Dates of rank ==
- 1878 – Underlöjtnant
- 1889 – Lieutenant
- 1900 – Lieutenant commander
- 1903 – Commander
- 1905 – Captain
- 1910 – Rear admiral
- 1917 – Vice admiral
- 1926 – Admiral

== Awards and decorations ==
=== Swedish ===
- (Sweden) Knight and Commander of the Orders of His Royal Majesty (16 June 1928), Chancellor of the Order
- (Sweden) King Gustaf V's Jubilee Commemorative Medal (1928)
- (Sweden) Commander Grand Cross of the Order of the Sword (16 December 1916)
- (Sweden) Commander 1st Class of the Order of the Sword (19 January 1909)
- (Sweden) Commander 2nd Class of the Order of the Sword (30 November 1907)
- (Sweden) Knight 1st Class of the Order of the Sword (1898)

=== Foreign ===
- (Belgium) Grand Cross of the Order of Leopold
- (Belgium) Grand Cross of the Order of the Crown
- (Denmark) Grand Cross of the Order of the Dannebrog (14 February 1919); with Breast Star in Diamonds, (14 May 1937)
- Grand Cross of the Order of the White Rose of Finland
- (Kingdom of Italy) Grand Cross of the Order of the Crown of Italy
- (Latvia) Grand Cross of the Order of the Three Stars
- (Monaco) Grand Cross of the Order of Saint-Charles
- (Netherlands) Grand Cross of the Order of Orange-Nassau with swords
- (Kingdom of Prussia) Knight First Class of the Order of the Red Eagle
- (Russian Empire) Knight First Class of the Order of Saint Anna
- (Spain) Grand Cross of the Order of Charles III
- (France) Grand Cross of the Legion of Honour
- (United Kingdom) Honorary Knight Commander of the Royal Victorian Order (3 August 1907)
- (Estonia) 1st Degree of the Cross of Liberty
- (Kingdom of Prussia) Knight 2nd Class of the Order of the Crown
- (Qing dynasty) 2nd Class, Third Grade of the Order of the Double Dragon
- (Norway) Knight 1st Class of the Order of St. Olav
- (Kingdom of Portugal) Knight of the Military Order of Saint James of the Sword
- (Austrian Empire) Knight 3rd Class of the Order of the Iron Crown (1890)

== Honours ==
- Member of the Royal Swedish Academy of War Sciences (1905)
- Honorary member of the Royal Swedish Society of Naval Sciences (1908)

Government offices
Preceded by Wilhelm Dyrssen	Minister for Naval Affairs; 1907–1910	Succeeded by Henning von Krusenstierna
Military offices
Preceded by Herman Wrangel	Flag captain 1907–1907	Succeeded by Gustaf af Klint
Preceded by Wilhelm Dyrssen	Inspector of the Navy's Exercises at Sea; 1916–1918	Succeeded by Himself
Preceded by Himself	Highest Commander of the Coastal Fleet; 1919–1919	Succeeded by Carl Alarik Wachtmeister
Court offices
Preceded by Gustaf Uggla	Chief of His Majesty's Military Staff; 1924–1944	Succeeded by Olof Thörnell
