= Charles de Champs =

Swedish Navy officer

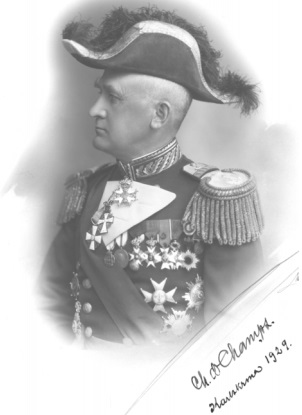
- de Champs in 1929.
- Born: Charles Léon de Champs; 10 October 1873; Stockholm, Sweden
- Died: 17 February 1959 (aged 85); Stockholm, Sweden
- Burial place: Norra begravningsplatsen
- Military career
- Allegiance: Sweden
- Branch: Swedish Navy
- Service years: 1893–1939
- Rank: Vice Admiral
- Commands: Flag captain; Inspector of the Submarine Service; East Coast Naval District; Chief of the Naval Staff; Chief of the Navy

Vice Admiral Charles Léon de Champs (10 October 1873 – 17 February 1959) was a Swedish Navy officer who was the Chief of the Naval Staff from 1936 to 1937 and the Chief of the Navy from 1936 to 1939.

== Early life ==
de Champs was born on 10 October 1873 in Stockholm, Sweden, the son of Belgium-born navy commander Charles Eugène de Champs (1837–1917) and his wife Eva (née Skytte af Sätra). He was brother of army officer Henri de Champs (1869–1948). His father immigrated from the Netherlands and came from a noble family. de Champs was a student at Praktiska arbetsskolan för barn och ungdom (later Palmgrenska samskolan) from 1880 to 1886 and was an extra cadet on the corvette Eugenie in 1886.

== Career ==
=== Military career ===
He conducted preparatory education at the Royal Swedish Naval Academy from 1886 and 1887 and was then a sea cadet at the Royal Swedish Naval Academy from 1887 to 1893, becoming a second lieutenant in the Swedish Fleet in 1893. de Champs was promoted to sub-lieutenant in 1896 and attended the Royal Institute of Technology's vocational school (fackskola) for the machine architecture and mechanical technology from 1896 to 1899 and was promoted to lieutenant in 1902.

He served in the Royal Swedish Naval Materiel Administration from 1899 to 1908 where he, between 1900 and 1908 began with attempts of wireless telegraphy. de Champs also handle the wireless telegraphy system in the Swedish Fleet and undertook study trips to Germany, France, England and Belgium as well as performed wireless telegraphy attempts between Karlskrona and Berlin in 1903. He was expert at the International Radiotelegraph Conference in Berlin in 1906. de Champs was duty officer for Prince Wilhelm, Duke of Södermanland from 1905 to 1908 and was naval attaché at the Swedish mission in Tokyo and Beijing from 1908 to 1910. He served in the Naval Staff from 1908 to 1915 and as naval attaché at the Swedish mission and in London from 1914 to 1917. de Champs was promoted to lieutenant commander in 1915. He was head of the Communications Department in the Naval Staff from 1916 to 1919 and promoted to commander in 1917.

He was chief of staff of the Commanding Admiral in Karlskrona's commandant staff from 1919 to 1923 when he reached the rank of captain. de Champs served as flag captain in the Chief of the Coastal Fleet's staff from 1923 to 1925 and the Inspector of the Submarine Service from 1926 to 1928. In 1927, de Champs was promoted to rear admiral in the Swedish Navy. He was rear admiral in the fleet and Commanding Admiral and station commander in Karlskrona from 1928 to 1933 and station commander in Stockholm from 1933 to 1936. He was promoted to vice admiral in 1934 and served as Chief of the Navy from 1936. de Champs became the first Chief of the Navy at a very perplexing time for the Navy. Questions about the replacement of obsolete ships and moving of the naval station from Skeppsholmen was still unresolved and was urgently in need of a solution. de Champs was succeeded by Vice Admiral Fabian Tamm on 1 April 1939.

=== Other work ===
de Champs became control officer at Stockholm Weapons Factory (Stockholms Vapenfabrik) in 1900. He was chairman of the Executive Board of the Navy Retirement Fund (Flottans pensionskassa) from 1928 to 1933 and was military member of the Supreme Court from 1933 to 1937.

In 1913, de Champs became a member of the Royal Swedish Society of Naval Sciences (honorary member in 1927) and he became a member of the Royal Swedish Academy of War Sciences in 1919. He was chairman of the Naval Officers Society in Stockholm (Sjöofficerssällskapet i Stockholm) from 1933 to 1936. de Champs was also a member of the National Society Sweden-Germany (Riksföreningen Sverige–Tyskland).

== Personal life ==
On 26 November 1919, de Champs married Ida Elisabeth Uggla (born 20 January 1897 in Gothenburg), the daughter of office manager Karl Vilhelm Valfrid Uggla and Julia Amelie Nordwall. They had three children; Madeleine, married to Hans Hedberg, Vallerstad, Kärda; Anne, married to ryttmästare Gustaf De Geer, Stockholm; Catherine, wife of Baron Hans-Otto Ramel, Stockholm.

de Champs owned Graninge farm at Baggensfjärden in Nacka Municipality for twelve years. he sold it to the foundation Stockholms stifts- och ungdomsgård ("Stockholm's Diocese and Youth Farm") in 1946.

== Death ==
de Champs died on 17 February 1959 at the Red Cross Hospital in Stockholm. He was interred on 27 February 1959 at Norra begravningsplatsen, near Stockholm.

== Dates of rank ==
- 4 November 1893 – Acting sub-lieutenant
- 20 March 1896 – Sub-lieutenant
- 4 April 1902 – Lieutenant
- 31 December 1915 – Lieutenant commander
- 14 December 1917 – Commander
- 28 February 1923 – Captain
- 4 February 1927 – Rear admiral
- 1934 – Vice admiral

== Awards and decorations ==
de Champs' awards:

=== Swedish ===
- (Sweden) Crown Prince Gustaf V and Crown Princess Silver Wedding Medal (1906)
- (Sweden) King Oscar II and Queen Sofia's Golden Wedding Medal (1907)
- (Sweden) Commander Grand Cross of the Order of the Sword (6 June 1934)
- (Sweden) Knight of the Order of the Polar Star (1922)
- (Sweden) Knight of the Order of Vasa (1903)

=== Foreign ===
- (Denmark) Grand Commander of the Order of the Dannebrog
- (Spain) Grand Cross of the Cross of Naval Merit
- (Netherlands) Grand Officer of the Order of Orange-Nassau with swords
- (Spain) Commander 1st Class of the Order of Isabella the Catholic
- Commander 2nd Class of the Order of the White Rose of Finland
- (Tunisia) Commander of the Order of Glory
- (Qing dynasty) Second Class, Third Grade of the Order of the Double Dragon
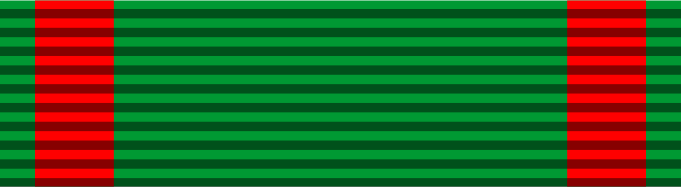
- (Ottoman Empire) Third Class of the Order of Osmanieh
- (France) Knight of the Legion of Honour
- (Empire of Japan) 4th Class of the Order of the Rising Sun
- (United Kingdom) Honorary Member of the 4th Class of the Royal Victorian Order (15 June 1905)

Military offices
Preceded by Gustaf Starck	Flag captain 1923–1925	Succeeded by Claës Lindsström
Preceded by Henrik Gisiko	Inspector of the Submarine Service; 1925–1928	Succeeded by Hans Simonsson
Preceded by None	East Coast Naval District; 1933–1936	Succeeded by Claës Lindsström
Preceded by Claës Lindsström	Chief of the Naval Staff; 1936–1937	Succeeded by Gösta Ehrensvärd
Preceded by None	Chief of the Navy; 1936–1939	Succeeded by Fabian Tamm
Professional and academic associations
Preceded by Ulf Carl Sparre	Chairman of the Royal Swedish Society of Naval Sciences; 1929–1933	Succeeded by Claës Lindsström
