= Royal Swedish Society of Naval Sciences =

Military organization

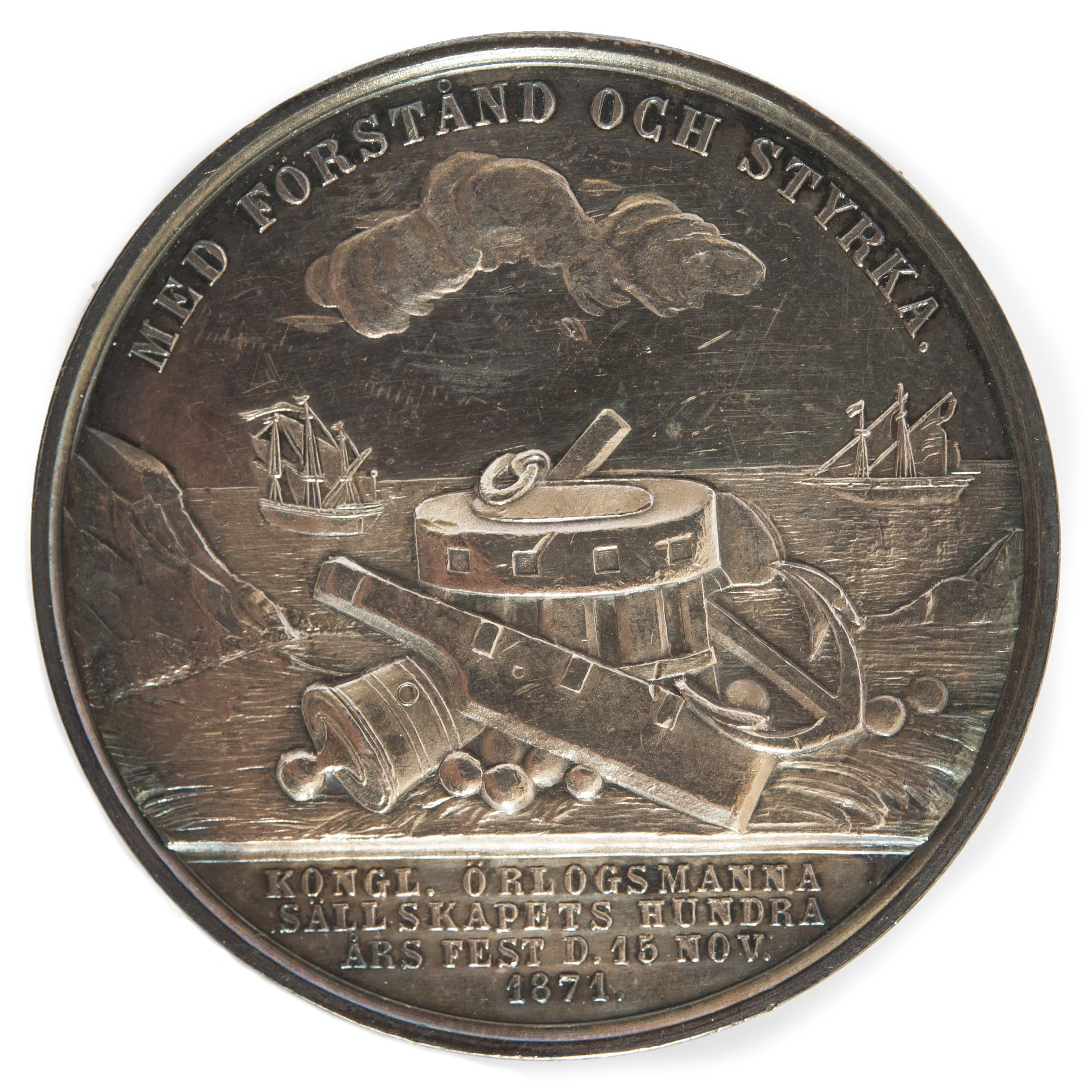
Commemorative medal issued by the Royal Swedish Society of Naval Sciences at their centennial jubilee

The Royal Swedish Society of Naval Sciences (Swedish: Kungliga Örlogsmannasällskapet, KÖMS), founded in 1771 by King Gustav III, is one of the Royal Academies in Sweden. The Society is an independent organization and a forum for navy and defence issues. Fellowship is limited to 120 chairs under the age of 60.

== Chairmen ==
- 1826–1827: Johan Lagerbielke
- 1832–1837: Carl August Gyllengranat
- 1838–1844: Carl August Gyllengranat
- 1857–1858: Carl August Gyllengranat
- 1923–1928: Ulf Carl Sparre
- 1929–1933: Charles de Champs
- 1934–1936: Claës Lindsström
- 1936–1938: Gunnar Bjurner
- 1939–1942: Hans Simonsson
- 1943–1949: Gösta Ehrensvärd
- 1950–1958: Erik Samuelson
- 1958–1961: Sigurd Lagerman
- 1961–1963: Bertil Berthelsson
- 1963–1966: Stig Bergelin
- 1966–1969: Dag Arvas
- 1969–1970: Åke Lindemalm
- 1970–1978: Bengt Lundvall
- 1979–1984: Bengt Rasin
- 1983–1986: Jan Enquist
- 1987–1992: Bror Stefenson
- 1992–2000: Claes Tornberg
- 2000–2002: Bertil Björkman
- 2002–2005: Göran Larsbrink
- 2005–2010: Leif Nylander
- 2010–2014: Thomas Engevall
- 2014–2018: Michael Zell
- 2018–2023: Anders Grenstad
- 2023–present: Odd Werin

== See also ==
- Society and Defense
- Swedish Navy
