= Royal Swedish Naval Staff College =

Naval staff college in Sweden

- Kungliga Sjökrigshögskolan
- Type: Staff college
- Active: 1898–1961
- Parent institution: Swedish Armed Forces
- Affiliations: Swedish Navy
- Location: Stockholm, Sweden
- Language: Swedish
- Garrison/HQ: Stockholm garrison

The Royal Swedish Naval Staff College (Swedish: Kungliga Sjökrigshögskolan, KSHS) was a Swedish Navy training establishment between 1898 and 1961, providing courses for naval officers. It was the home of the Swedish Navy's staff college, which provided advanced training for officers. It was located within the Stockholm garrison in Stockholm, Sweden.

== History ==
The Royal Swedish Naval Staff College was established by regulations on 11 March 1898. According to regulations and teaching charters (23 October 1908 with amendments on 29 September 1911 and 29 June 1912) the Royal Swedish Naval Staff College had the purpose to educate naval officers and give them expanded knowledge in those subjects which were important to pursue the purpose of the maritime defense.

The education was in 1914 a one-year long general course for subaltern officers and a one-year long advanced course (general, artillery, torpedo and naval mine courses) for officers, who had completed the general course. Subjects covered in the general course were strategy, tactics, coastal fortress, land warfare, military coastal geography, artillery, torpedo, naval mine, physics and mathematics (the latter was optional). In the advanced course teaching was in special subjects, and in some of the general course subjects. The Royal Swedish Naval Staff College permanent staff consisted of a head, an adjutant and librarian, teachers in 15 subjects, rehearsers and a caretaker. During the years 1899-1900 there was only one student in the advanced course, Lieutenant Carl Gustav Flach.

According to the regulations issued on 17 September 1923 the education was a one-year long general course, designed for subaltern officers, as well as a one and two-year long higher course (general higher course, artillery, torpedo and naval mine courses) for officers who had undergone the general course. For subjects in the general course, air warfare and naval officer's programme and navigation were added. Only the coastal artillery course included physics. In higher education courses, special subjects were included, and in some of the general course subjects. In 1926 there were teachers in 18 subjects. As students, the Navy's subaltern officers were commanded in turn; an entry qualification was not needed.

The Royal Swedish Naval Staff College was discontinued in 1961 and the Royal Swedish Armed Forces Staff College was formed by merging war colleges of the different military branches, namely the Royal Swedish Army Staff College (established 1878), the Royal Swedish Naval Staff College (established 1898) and the Royal Swedish Air Force Staff College (established 1939).

== Location ==
The Royal Swedish Naval Staff College was located at the following addresses in Stockholm:

- Styrmansgatan 32
- Banérgatan 29
- Arsenalsgatan 9 (1909–1921)
- Birger Jarlsgatan 7 (collocated with the Naval Staff 1921–1926)
- Östermalmsgatan 87 (in the building Generalitetshuset, also called "Grå Huset" 1926–1961)

== Heads ==
Heads of the Royal Swedish Naval Staff College:

- 1898–1901: Carl Hjulhammar
- 1901–1905: Ludvig Sidner
- 1905–1905: Gustaf Dyrssen
- 1905–1909: Pehr Dahlgren
- 1909–1912: Wilhelm Hamilton
- 1913–1914: Carl Kson Sparre
- 1914–1919: Carl Engström
- 1914–1915: Carl Alarik Wachtmeister (acting)
- 1919–1923: John Schneidler
- 1923–1925: Gustaf Starck
- 1925–1930: Gunnar Unger
- 1930–1933: Claës Lindsström
- 1933–1935: Nils Åkerblom
- 1935–1938: Lave Beck-Friis
- 1938–1943: Eric Öberg
- 1943–1945: Erik Anderberg
- 1945–1948: Ragnar Smith
- 1948–1951: Daniel Landquist
- 1951–1954: Evert Lindh
- 1954–1957: Harald Callerström
- 1957–1957: Gunnar Fogelberg
- 1957–1959: Magnus Starck
- 1959–1961: Gustav Lindgren
- 1961–1961: Bertil Larsson

== See also ==
- Royal Swedish Naval Academy
