= Carl Alarik Wachtmeister =

Swedish Navy officer

Count Carl Alarik Wachtmeister
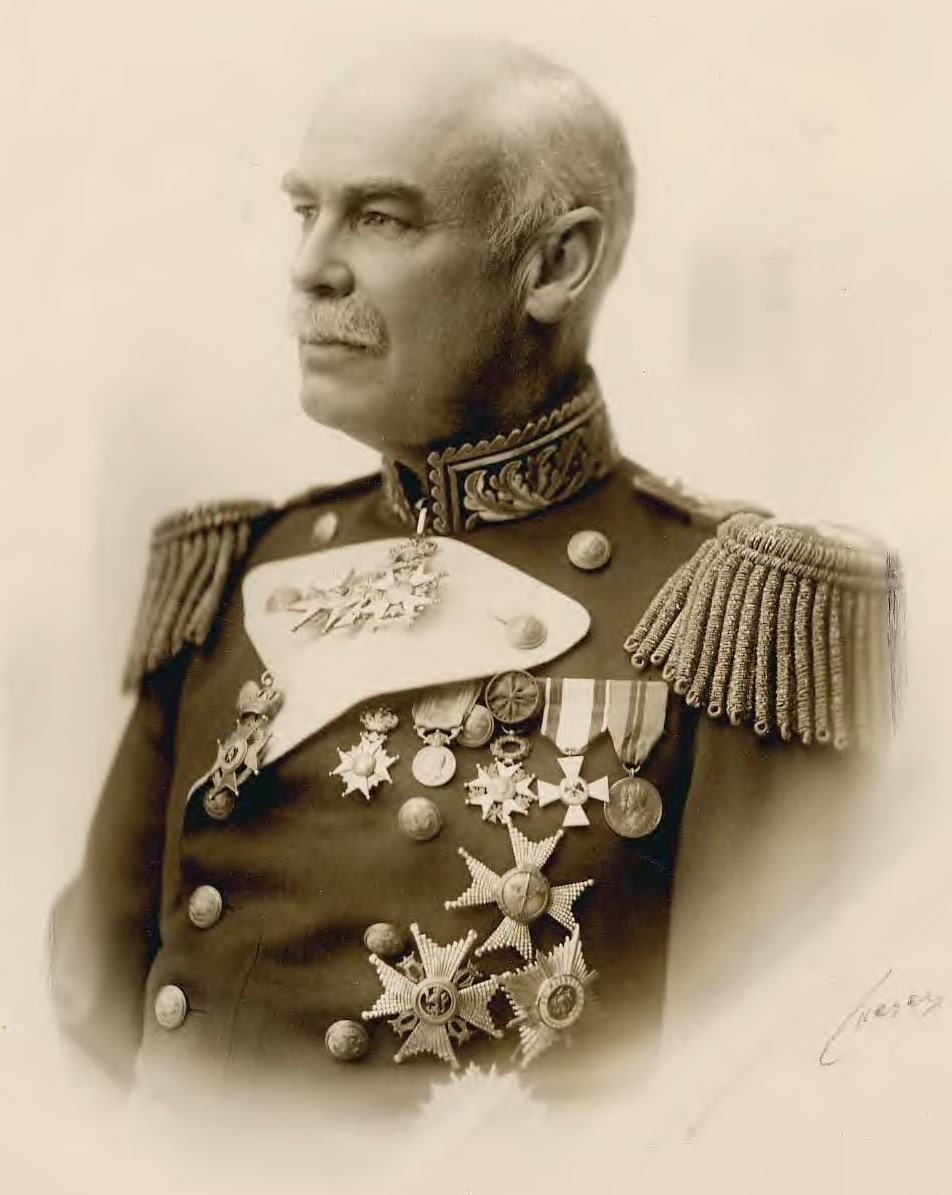
- Born: Carl Alarik Hansson Wachtmeister; 28 March 1865; Hjortsberga, Sweden
- Died: 26 November 1925 (aged 60); Stockholm, Sweden
- Burial place: Galärvarvskyrkogården
- Relatives: Fredrik von Otter (father-in-law)
- Military career
- Branch: Swedish Navy
- Service years: 1878–1925
- Rank: Vice Admiral
- Commands: HSwMS Thor; Royal Naval Academy; HSwMS Fylgia; Royal Naval Staff College; Flag Captain; Submarine Service; Coastal Fleet; Stockholm Naval Station

Vice Admiral Count Carl Alarik Hansson Wachtmeister (28 March 1865 – 26 November 1925) was a senior Swedish Navy officer who served as Commander-in-Chief of the Coastal Fleet (1919–1923) as well as of Stockholm Naval Station (1923–1925). Wachtmeister was born into a noble family. He joined the Royal Swedish Naval Academy in 1878 and graduated in 1884 as an underlöjtnant. Early in his naval career, he gained extensive experience through training and command of ships, including the brigs Skirner and Snapphopp. He was promoted steadily, taking on significant responsibilities such as commanding vessels, leading cadet units, and working on modernization proposals for coastal defence ships. By the early 1900s, he held several key staff and leadership roles, including command of the cruiser Fylgia and the Royal Swedish Naval Academy. Wachtmeister was instrumental in reforming military law and contributed to naval training programs. During World War I, he served as Flag Captain and later became Inspector of the Submarine Service. He was promoted to rear admiral in 1919 and led the Coastal Fleet until 1923. Alongside his military duties, he advised on international naval treaties and was involved in civil service roles, including the Supreme Court. He was promoted to vice admiral shortly before his death in 1925.

== Early life ==
Wachtmeister was born into the Wachtmeister family on 28 March 1865 at his family estate, Johannishus Castle, in Hjortsberga, Blekinge County, Sweden. His parents were the county governor, Count Hans Wachtmeister of Johannishus, and Baroness Ebba De Geer of Finspång. Wachtmeister was admitted to the Royal Swedish Naval Academy on 30 September 1878. Aboard the corvette Saga, he completed his initial training as a cadet over six summers. After completing the academy’s six land-based and naval classes, he graduated on 20 October 1884 and was appointed an underlöjtnant in the Swedish Navy on 24 October 1884.

== Career ==
After a little over four years of service, Wachtmeister was promoted to sub-lieutenant on 25 January 1889. During his early years, he focused on further training, attending the officers’ course at the drill school, serving as a boatswain officer, and undertaking instruction at the mine school and in dockyard duties. In 1888, he also completed a course at the Swedish Infantry Gunnery School at Rosersberg Palace. Between 1879 and 1922, he was without sea duty for only three years. As a sub-lieutenant, he was already in independent command in 1891 and 1892—serving one year as commanding officer of the brig Skirner, and the other year aboard the brig Snapphopp. During the 1890s, he also held command assignments typically reserved for captains, including commanding brigs, serving as flag adjutant, and as second-in-command. In Karlskrona, he alternated between the drill school, the naval cadet corps, station duty, and dockyard service. He later became commander of the 2nd Naval Cadet Company (2:a skeppsgossekompaniet).

He was promoted to lieutenant on 1 April 1896. Two years later, in 1898, he served as secretary of a committee that proposed modifications to the coastal defence ships Svea, Göta, and Thule. These proposals led to rebuilds that made the ships particularly powerful for their size. On 1 October 1898, he was appointed officer at the hydrographic and naval instrument depot at the Karlskrona station. In 1901, he was transferred from Karlskrona to the Stockholm station, where he would remain for the rest of his career. He was assigned to the Fleet Staff until 1907, and subsequently served at the Naval Staff from 1907 to 1909. During this time, he was also an alternate member of the Pilot Board (Lotsstyrelsen) from 1905 to 1909.

He was promoted to lieutenant commander on 26 October 1906 and served on the governing board of the Swedish Red Cross from 1906 to 1916. That same year, he was among a group of officers appointed by the minister for justice to work on a proposal for revising the military penal code. This proposal laid the groundwork for the new military criminal law. In 1908, Wachtmeister was given command of the coastal defence ship Thor. From 1909 to 1914, he served as head of the Royal Swedish Naval Academy, and from 1909 to 1915, he commanded the armoured cruiser Fylgia during cadet expeditions to foreign waters. In his role as head of the Naval Academy, he was also department head of the Naval Academy Division (Sjökrigsskoleavdelningen). Wachtmeister was promoted to commander on 17 February 1911. From 1 October 1914 to 15 May 1915, he served as head of the Royal Swedish Naval Staff College. Toward the end of 1915, during World War I, he was appointed acting Flag Captain (chief of staff) to the Inspector of Naval Exercises at Sea—a position he officially assumed the following year. During this time, he served aboard Oscar II and later Sverige between 1915 and 1918. He also participated in matters relating to the Åland Islands dispute.

He was promoted to captain in the navy on 30 June 1916, and officially within the fleet on 15 December of the same year. He served as Inspector of the Submarine Service from 19 April 1918 to 30 September 1919. On 20 September 1919, he was promoted to rear admiral. From 30 September 1919 to 27 March 1923, he served as Commander-in-Chief of the Coastal Fleet. He flew his flag as commander-in-chief aboard Äran in 1920 and aboard Sverige in 1921 and 1922.

In parallel with his military career, he also undertook civilian responsibilities. He was a member of the committee that revised the regulations for the naval pension fund, and in 1921 he was appointed as an advisor to the Convention Respecting the Non-Fortification and Neutralisation of the Åland Islands (Åland convention), held in Geneva. On 28 February 1923, he was appointed commanding officer of the Stockholm Naval Station—a post he held until his death. On 9 March the same year, he became a military member of the Supreme Court. He had previously served for over two years as an alternate member of the Court-Martial of Appeal. He was also an expert on officer training courses for ensigns and on training programs for naval corporals and non-commissioned officers—an area in which he showed great interest and understanding. Additionally, he was actively involved in the work of the Swedish Red Cross for many years. On 23 October 1925, just one month before his death, Wachtmeister was promoted to vice admiral.

Admiral Gustaf Dyrssen described Wachtmeister’s career and character in an obituary:

The outline of his career paints the external image of a highly successful and honorable life devoted to service in the navy. But within that outline was a distinctly masculine personality that gave the picture life and depth — and helped shape the course of his journey. He possessed a sharp and vibrant intellect, combined with an inherited appreciation for intellectual pursuits and a strong work ethic. He also acquired a broad and deep education, not only within his professional field but also in general knowledge, which served him well when leading our officer training institution. But above all, he is remembered as a person of noble integrity and upright character — a true role model in every sense. He loved his country and his branch of service. He wished well for those around him and reserved his disapproval only for what was twisted, unjust, or ugly in life. For this, he was met with sincere affection by all — whether high or low. He was a worthy heir to a proud family name with honorable roots dating back to the navy’s renewal during the Swedish Empire.

== Personal life ==
On 10 January 1889 in Karlskrona, Wachtmeister married Baroness Helga Sofia von Otter (6 December 1868 – 13 March 1923), the daughter of the Prime Minister of Sweden (1900–02), Admiral, Baron Fredrik von Otter, and his wife Matilda Dahlström. They had three children: Rear Admiral Alarik Wachtmeister (1890–1953), Maud Ebba (born 1892), and Maud Elsa Margareta (born 1908).

== Death and funeral ==
=== Death ===
Wachtmeister died on 26 November 1925 in the Skeppsholmen Parish of Stockholm. In the years leading up to his death, he had suffered from a heart condition.

=== Funeral ===
The funeral service was held on 1 December 1925 at Skeppsholmen Church. The procession had made its way from the admiral’s residence on Skeppsholmen. The Royal Swedish Navy Band of Stockholm (Flottans musikkår), conducted by Music Director Erik Högberg, performed Chopin's funeral march. On Wachtmeister’s flag-draped casket lay his sword. King Gustaf V was represented by Captain (N) Hans Ericson, and Crown Prince Gustaf Adolf, Duke of Skåne, was represented by Captain von Bahr. Also in attendance were Prince Wilhelm, Duke of Södermanland, and Prince Bernadotte.

Among the many dignitaries present were Minister of Defence Per Albin Hansson; U.S. Minister Robert Woods Bliss and his military attaché; the French Minister and military attaché; the Dutch Minister; and the British military attaché. Other notable attendees included Count Hugo E. G. Hamilton; Admiral Wilhelm Dyrssen; Vice Admirals Carl Olsen, Count Carl August Ehrensvärd, Gustaf Dyrssen, Henning von Krusenstierna, and Henry Lindberg; Rear Admirals Jacob Hägg, Magnus Ingelman, Arvid Lindman, Sten Ankarcrona, Fredrik Riben, John Schneidler, and Albert Fallenius; Lieutenant General Herman Wrangel; Major Generals Baron Lars Sparre, Ludvig Hammarskiöld, and Baron Herman Wrangel; Justices of the Supreme Court of Sweden — Edvard Petrén, Louis Améen, Pehr von Seth, Carl Christiansson, Erik Molin, Axel Edelstam, and Birger Ekeberg; District Judge Marcus Wallenberg Sr; Director-General Bergqvist; Captains (N) Eneström, Henrik Gisiko, Gunnar Unger, Charles de Champs, Harald Åkermark, Carl Engström, Baron Axel Gyllenkrok; Director-General of Naval Construction (marinöverdirektör) Johannes Lindbeck; Paymaster General (marinöverintendenten) Birger Maijström; and Surgeon-in-Chief of the Swedish Navy, Gunnar Nilson.

Officer delegations were also present from the Svea Life Guards, led by Colonel Oscar Nygren; the Göta Life Guards, led by Colonel John Nauckhoff; and the Life Guards of Horse, led by Baron Carl von Essen. Colonels Sjögreen, Améen, Baron Banér, Lindström, and Meister also attended. From the Karlskrona Naval Station came a delegation led by Captain (N) Karl Wester. The Royal Swedish Naval Academy attended in full formation, with both staff and students present, and the academy's flag was placed by Admiral Wachtmeister’s casket. The board of the Naval Home (Örlogshemmet) was represented by Consul General Axel Ax:son Johnson and several senior officers including Commander Lannerstierna and others. The casket was carried by eight naval officers: Lieutenants Håkansson, Hafström, Wahlström, Torén, Strömbäck, Hedin, Anderberg, and Baron Palmqvist. Serving as marshals were Commanders Baron Lave Beck-Friis, Lieutenant Baron Wrede, and Lieutenant Wirgin.

From the church gallery, Notary Fred Sanderberg performed the aria "If with all your hearts ye truly seek Me" from Mendelssohn's oratorio "Elijah". The service was officiated by Acting Regimental Chaplain Dr. G. Brandt, who gave a eulogy based on Psalm 139:23–24. After the funeral rite, the Engelbrekt Church Choir, under the direction of Music Director David Åhlén, sang "Agnus Dei" by Spangenberg. The clergy of Skeppsholmen, led by officiant Pastor G. Buréus, approached the altar in liturgical robes and jointly sang part of the Litany. After hymn 484:4, the choir performed "Komm, süßer Tod, komm selge Ruh" by Johann Sebastian Bach. The Navy Band then played Landkjenning by Grieg, after which the procession exited the church. The funeral procession descended the church hill with the Navy Band at the lead, performing Charles XV’s funeral march by Conrad Nordqvist. Along the path, companies of soldiers stood at attention in honor guard formation. Upon arrival at the main guard station, the guard presented arms.

Admiral Wachtmeister was honored with an especially grand floral tribute. Among the wreaths were those from: Minister of Defence Per Albin Hansson; the Danish Ministry of the Navy (Marineministeriet); the British Admiralty (“With sympathy from the British Admiralty”); the U.S. Minister and Mrs. Bliss; the Supreme Court; the British naval attaché Captain Egerton; the Royal Swedish Naval Academy; the Naval Officers' Association in Stockholm, Naval Officers' Association in Karlskrona; the Naval Non-Commissioned Officers' Society of Marstrand (Sjöunderofficerssällskapet i Marstrand); the Navy Corporals' Association (Flottans korpralförening); the Second Submarine Division (II. undervattensbåtsdivisionen); the Naval Education Commission (Flottans skolsakkunniga); Drottning Victorias Örlogshem; the staff of military and civil departments; the Navy Engineers’ Association (Flottans maskinistförening); the Navy clerical staff; and the Navy Band (Flottans musikkår). Additional floral tributes were sent through the Blomsterfonden, including one from the Association of the Men of 1865 (Föreningen 1865 års män). On the day of the funeral, all ships in the harbor flew their flags at half-mast. Wachtmeister was interred at Galärvarvskyrkogården the same day.

== Dates of rank ==
- 24 October 1884 – Underlöjtnant
- 25 January 1889 – Sub-lieutenant
- 1 April 1896 – Lieutenant
- 26 October 1906 – Lieutenant commander
- 17 February 1911 – Commander
- 30 June 1916 – Captain
- 20 September 1919 – Rear admiral
- 23 October 1925 – Vice admiral

== Awards and decorations ==
=== Swedish ===
- (Sweden) Commander 1st Class of the Order of the Sword (6 June 1920)
- (Sweden) Commander 2nd Class of the Order of the Sword (6 June 1919)
- (Sweden) Knight of the Order of the Sword (1 December 1904)
- (Sweden) Knight of the Order of the Polar Star (6 June 1917)
- (Sweden) Medal for Noble Deeds in gold (Note: This was a reward for rescuing a man overboard.)

=== Foreign ===
- (Kingdom of Prussia) Knight 3rd Class of the Order of the Red Eagle (8 August 1908)
- (France) Officer of the Legion of Honour (1908)
- (Denmark) Commander 2nd Class of the Order of the Dannebrog (10 July 1910)
- (France) Knight of the Order of the Black Star (1911)
- (Belgium) Commander of the Order of Leopold (1912)
- (Russian Empire) Knight 2nd Class of the Order of Saint Anna (1912)
- (Tunisia) 1st Class of the Order of Glory (1914)
- (Netherlands) Grand Officer with Sword of the Order of Orange-Nassau (1920)
- (Norway) Commander with Star of the Order of St. Olav (13 May 1920)
- (France) Commander of the Legion of Honour (1922)
- (Kingdom of Italy) Grand Officer of the Order of Saints Maurice and Lazarus (1923)
- (Denmark) Commander 1st Class of the Order of the Dannebrog
- Commander 1st Class of the Order of the White Rose of Finland
- StbVM

== Honours ==
- Member of the Royal Swedish Academy of War Sciences (1908)
- Member of the Royal Swedish Society of Naval Sciences (1898)
- Honorary member of the Royal Swedish Society of Naval Sciences (1919)

== Footnotes ==
Military offices
Preceded by Henry Lindberg	Royal Swedish Naval Academy; 1909–1914	Succeeded by Carl Sparre
Preceded by Carl Engström	Royal Swedish Naval Staff College; 1914–1915	Succeeded by John Schneidler
Preceded by Henning von Krusenstierna	Flag Captain; 1915–1918	Succeeded by Henrik Gisiko
Preceded by None	Inspector of the Submarine Service; 1918–1919	Succeeded by Henrik Gisiko
Preceded by Carl August Ehrensvärd	Coastal Fleet; 1919–1923	Succeeded by Fredrik Riben
Preceded by Wilhelm Dyrssen	Stockholm Naval Station; 1923–1925	Succeeded by Fredrik Riben
