= Henning von Krusenstierna =

Swedish Navy officer

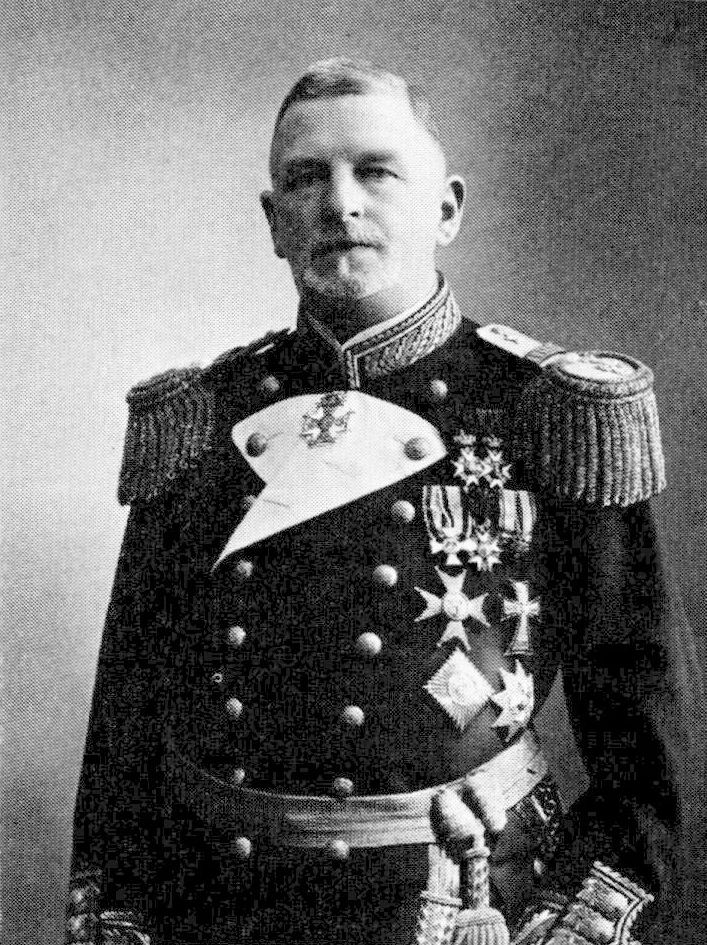
- Born: Henning Wilhelm Mauritz von Krusenstierna; 19 February 1862; Uddevalla, Sweden
- Died: 30 October 1933 (aged 71); Stockholm, Sweden
- Burial place: Galärvarvskyrkogården
- Military career
- Allegiance: Sweden
- Branch: Swedish Navy
- Service years: 1882–1927
- Rank: Admiral
- Nickname: "Krusis"
- Commands: Svensksund; Coastal Defence Ship Division; Military Office of the Ministry for Naval Affairs; Ministry for Naval Affairs; Flag Captain; Chief of the Naval Staff
- Other work: Minister for Naval Affairs (1910–11)

Admiral Henning Wilhelm Mauritz von Krusenstierna (19 February 1862 – 30 October 1933) was a senior Swedish Navy officer. Von Krusenstierna began his military career in the Swedish Navy in 1882 and participated in a world voyage aboard the frigate Vanadis. He sought further expertise by serving in the Italian Navy in the early 1890s before returning to Sweden, where he spent 15 years in the Naval Staff, working on tactics, signaling, and coastal defense. His work led to the creation of Sweden's coastal signaling service. In 1910, he became Minister for Naval Affairs, briefly leaving active service before returning to command naval divisions during World War I. In 1916, he was appointed Chief of the Naval Staff, overseeing Sweden's naval organization and reforms until his retirement in 1927. His tenure was marked by major defense policy developments, including naval aviation and reorganization efforts. Even after retirement, he remained active in naval discussions, publishing essays and historical works until his passing in 1933.

== Early life ==
Von Krusenstierna was born on 19 February 1862 at Nedre Bräcke in Bäve Parish, Uddevalla Municipality, Sweden, the son of captain Carl Sebastian von Krusenstierna and Selma Amanda Margareta Berggren. He had one older sister, Hedvig Louise Gabriella (born 20 July 1860). In 1876, as a fourteen-year-old boy, he left home, and enlisted at the Royal Swedish Naval Academy. There he became good friends with the future Prime Minister of Sweden, Arvid Lindman. The following year he participated in a naval expedition with the frigate Norrköping and then with the steam corvette Saga from 1878 to 1882.

== Career ==
=== Military career ===
In October 1882, von Krusenstierna was appointed underlöjtnant in the Swedish Navy. He was fortunate enough to be selected for the frigate Vanadis' sailing expedition around the world 1883–1885 with Rear Admiral Otto Lagerberg as commander and, among others, the then Prince Oscar Bernadotte as an officer. He then attended the Royal Central Gymnastics Institute and served with other young officers in various places, on board and ashore. His general interest and desire to improve in his profession led him to apply for employment in the years 1890–1891 in the Italian Navy in Italy, where he sailed aboard several ships such as the training ship Venezia and the ironclad Italia. After returning home from Italy, von Krusenstierna began in 1892 a service in the Fleet Staff, later the Naval Staff, which practically continued for fifteen years in a row until 1906, of which during the last two years as head of the then Mobilization and Statistics Department. During this time, he participated in investigations concerning tactics, signaling, regulations, conscription statutes and more and formed as an extra member of the Pilot Board (Lotsstyrelsen) the organization of Sweden's coastal signaling service. In the meantime he had also gradually been promoted to sub-lieutenant, lieutenant and in 1902 to lieutenant commander, and had several naval commands on ships in Swedish waters as well as in 1900 on the gunboat Svensksund during the Swedish–Russian Arc-of-Meridian Expedition to Spitsbergen in the Arctic Ocean and from 1902 to 1903 on the corvette Freja to the West Indies. From 1898 to 1906 von Krusenstierna was also a teacher at the Royal Swedish Naval Staff College and in 1905 he was a military expert at the conference in Karlstad, when the union between Sweden and Norway was dissolved.

What was already particularly evident in his conditions of service during this time was the great extent to which he was used for special assignments. A memoir written by Admiral Otto Lybeck mentions his "unusual ability to work, skill in the profession and convivial ability to collaborate with others, as well as his many ideas". His work on military coastal geography is mainly mentioned, from which he was led to the idea of a surveillance and signaling system operating along the entire Swedish coast, later called the coastal signaling service (kustsignalväsendet). This creation of von Krusenstierna was designed by him during his service around the turn of the century in the Pilot Board. In addition, he participated as a secretary, expert or committee member in investigations regarding tactics and signal book for the navy, international signal book, conscription regulations, regulations for the Swedish Naval Engineers' Corps (Mariningenjörkåren), regulations for the Swedish Coastal Artillery, regulations for the Swedish Navy, etc.

In 1906, von Krusenstierna left the Naval Staff for a period of ten years, during which he was entrusted with other assignments and positions. From 1906 to 1909 he served as head of the Military Office of the Ministry for Naval Affairs (Sjöförsvarsdepartementets kommandoexpedition) and then as chief of staff of the Inspector of the Navy's Exercises at Sea, an office which later corresponded with that of the Flag Captain of the Commander-in-Chief of the Coastal Fleet. He was promoted to commander in 1909. When the change of naval minister took place in 1910 within Rear Admiral Arvid Lindman's first cabinet, he became Minister for Naval Affairs and head of the Ministry for Naval Affairs on 10 June 1910 (after Carl August Ehrensvärd), and thus he was reunited in government with his eldest and best friend. After the resignation of the cabinet in 1911, von Krusenstierna returned to the Inspector of the Navy's Exercises at Sea and served in 1912 and 1913 as Flag Captain aboard the coastal defence ships Oden, Äran and Oscar II, during which he was promoted to captain in 1912.

After the outbreak of World War I, the navy was mobilized and von Krusenstierna was assigned to command one of its coastal defence ship divisions between 1914 and 1916 with Rear Admiral Wilhelm Dyrssen as the Inspector of the Navy's Exercises at Sea. During this time, he was also called by the then Minister for Naval Affairs Dan Broström to the task of being the first military expert to participate in the Ministry for Naval Affairs with the drafting of a bill to the Riksdag of 1914 regarding a new defence order. The neutrality protection force continued and von Krusenstierna stayed with his division on various Swedish coastlines in the Baltic Sea and the Gulf of Bothnia. In 1916, the then Chief of the Naval Staff, Vice Admiral Ludvig Sidner, resigned, and von Krusenstierna was appointed his successor, who was at the same time appointed rear admiral. With this he took over his most important office, which he retained until his retirement in 1927.

When he took office, it was in the middle of World War I and the Swedish Navy was still mobilized as a neutrality protection force, causing a very tense job for the Naval Staff. One extensive investigation or proposal after another followed, all as a result of or in connection with the end and aftermath of World War I, the dismantling of the neutrality protection force and the demobilization of the navy, the organization in 1917 of the Swedish Navy Aviation (Marinens Flygväsende), the 1919 parliamentary decision on the merger of the defence ministries, the 1919 naval preparation – under the leadership of Vice Admiral Gustaf Dyrssen – concerning the organization of the Swedish Navy, Sweden's accession to the League of Nations, the activities of the defence audit 1919–1923, the 1920 and 1926 investigations of the central defence administration and the Swedish Armed Forces' high command, and the two bills 1924 and 1925 on the organization of the Swedish defence. Personally, von Krusenstierna led an investigation into the military service at the naval stations and, as Chief of the Naval Staff, put the finishing touches on the reorganization of the naval training system, which, led by a comprehensive report by Vice Admiral Carl Alarik Wachtmeister and other experts, was carried out in 1924 and subsequent years. Also demanding work for the Naval Staff, when it came to putting the 1925 Naval Order in order. With this naval order, by which von Krusenstierna, in his own words, referred to the principled composition of the naval forces and the organization of the regular coastal defence, also followed the naval plan, which was presented to the Riksdag in 1927 and which set guidelines for the extent of naval forces, the lifespan of naval ships, the resulting annual need for replacement building and hence the mathematically the following annual ratio for costs. The said naval plan was based on a report by special experts, who were appointed in 1925 and who included, personally summoned, both the Chief of the Naval Staff and the head of the Royal Swedish Naval Materiel Administration. In 1925, von Krusenstierna also commanded the large exercise of the Coastal Fleet in the Baltic Sea from 10 August to 17 August.

=== Retirement ===
Von Krusenstierna remained in the naval reserve until he turned seventy in 1932. After leaving the Naval Staff and the service, he continued with a never-failing interest in the issues of the navy, and wrote essays in newspapers and magazines as well as in publications published by Marinlitteraturföreningen. In addition, he was very interested in historical issues, mainly maritime history, but also others. Together with Gustaf af Klint, von Krusenstierna published Ny internationell signalbok (1902). He has also published Likheter och olikheter mellan sjökriget på innanhaven och på oceanerna (1930). After he retired from the navy, he also played a role as a member of the Court-Martial of Appeal from 1930 to 1932. Bohuslän's guild in Stockholm had him as its chairman from the annual meeting in May 1911 until his death on 30 October 1933.

== Personal life ==
Von Krusenstierna owned a villa in the garden city of Äppelviken in Bromma, Stockholm. He was never married.

== Death ==
Von Krusenstierna died on 30 October 1933 in Skeppsholm Parish (Skeppsholms församling) in Stockholm due to atherosclerosis. He was interred on 10 November 1933 at Galärvarvskyrkogården in Stockholm.

== Dates of rank ==
- 18 October 1882 – Underlöjtnant
- 29 April 1887 – Sub-lieutenant
- 10 August 1892 – Lieutenant
- 31 October 1903 – Lieutenant commander
- 22 January 1909 – Commander
- 1 April 1912 – Captain
- 27 June 1916 – Rear admiral
- 22 June 1923 – Vice admiral
- 1 April 1927 – Admiral

== Awards and decorations ==
=== Swedish ===
- (Sweden) Commander Grand Cross of the Order of the Sword (6 June 1923)
- (Sweden) Commander 1st Class of the Order of the Sword (6 June 1911)
- (Sweden) Knight 1st Class of the Order of the Sword (1 December 1902)
- (Sweden) Knight 1st Class of the Order of Vasa (21 January 1904)
- (Sweden) Knight of the Order of the Polar Star (6 November 1905)

=== Foreign ===
- (Spain) Grand Cross of the Cross of Naval Merit (22 January 1924)
- Grand Officer of the Order of the Crown of Italy (7 July 1913)
- Knight of the Order of the Crown of Italy (16 February 1893)
- (Denmark) Commander 1st Class of the Order of the Dannebrog (21 July 1913)
- (France) Commander of the Legion of Honour (29 August 1922)
- (France) Officer of the Legion of Honour (1908)
- (Kingdom of Prussia) Knight 2nd Class of the Order of the Crown with star (2 September 1913)
- (Russian Empire) Knight 2nd Class of the Order of Saint Anna (1908)
- (Kingdom of Prussia) Knight 3rd Class of the Order of the Red Eagle (August 1908)
- 5th Class of the Order of the Crown of Thailand (18 November 1884)

== Honours ==
- Member of the Royal Swedish Society of Naval Sciences (1897)
- Honorary member of the Royal Swedish Society of Naval Sciences (1910)
- Member of the Royal Swedish Academy of War Sciences (1905)
- President of the Royal Swedish Academy of War Sciences (1927–1929)

== Bibliography ==
- Krusenstierna, Henning von; Klint, Gustaf af, eds. (1902). Internationell signalbok: 1902 : enligt nådigt uppdrag (in Swedish). Stockholm: Norstedt. SELIBR 8223792.
- Krusenstierna, Henning von (1914). Flottan och näringarna (in Swedish). Stockholm. SELIBR 3193332.
- Krusenstierna, Henning von (1930). Likheter och olikheter mellan sjökriget på innanhaven och på oceanerna. Marinlitteraturföreningen, 0348-2405; 33 (in Swedish). Stockholm: Marinlitteraturföreningens förlag. SELIBR 1339643.

Government offices
Preceded by Carl August Ehrensvärd	Minister for Naval Affairs; 1910–1911	Succeeded by Harald Åkermark
Military offices
Preceded by Carl August Ehrensvärd	Military Office of the Ministry for Naval Affairs; 1906–1909	Succeeded by Carl Sparre
Preceded by Gustaf af Klint	Flag Captain; 1909–1915	Succeeded by Carl Alarik Wachtmeister
Preceded by Ludvig Sidner	Chief of the Naval Staff; 1916–1927	Succeeded by Otto Lybeck
Professional and academic associations
Preceded by Pehr Hasselrot	President of the Royal Swedish Academy of War Sciences; 1927–1929	Succeeded by Bror Munck
