= Fredrik Riben =

Swedish Navy officer

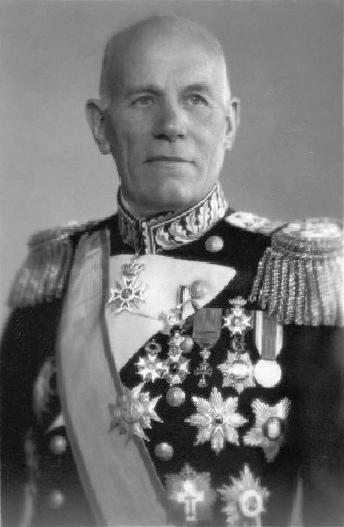
- Born: Carl Fredrik Wilhelm Riben; 13 May 1868; Håbo-Tibble, Sweden
- Died: 3 August 1950 (aged 82); Uddevalla, Sweden
- Burial place: Sandsborgskyrkogården
- Military career
- Branch: Swedish Navy
- Service years: 1889–1933
- Rank: Vice Admiral
- Nickname: "Calle Riben"
- Commands: HSwMS Hugin; HSwMS Fylgia; HSwMS Sverige; Royal Swedish Naval Academy; Military Office of the Minister for Naval Affairs; Coastal Fleet; Stockholm Naval Station

Vice Admiral Carl Fredrik Wilhelm Riben (13 May 1868 – 3 August 1950) was a senior Swedish Navy officer. Riben served as head of the Royal Swedish Naval Academy (1918–1921), of the Military Office of the Minister for Naval Affairs (1921–1923), as Commander-in-Chief of the Coastal Fleet (1923–1925) as well as of Stockholm Naval Station (1926–1933). He also served as president of the Royal Swedish Academy of War Sciences (1933–1935) and chairman of the Directorate of the Swedish Nobility Foundation (1940–1944).

== Early life ==
Riben was born on 13 May 1868 at Löfsta farm in Håbo-Tibble socken, Uppsala County, Sweden, the son of Axel Riben and his wife Rosa Malm. He was the brother of Karl-Axel Riben (1867–1934), the head of the Royal Swedish Opera in Stockholm. Riben devoted himself to the naval profession from his earliest youth and already sailed in 1882 as an aspirant aboard the corvette Norrköping. In autumn 1883, he was accepted as a cadet and went through the then six-year Royal Swedish Naval Academy with summer expeditions on the corvette Saga and the frigate Vanadis.

== Career ==
=== Military career ===
Riben was commissioned as a naval officer in the Swedish Navy in 1889 and was promoted to sub-lieutenant in 1891. In the years 1890-1891, he served on the corvette Freja and during his time as a subaltern officer was otherwise used for station and shipyard duty as well as sea tours, among other things, on the coastal defence ship Göta and the corvette Norrköping. Riben was a cadet officer at the Royal Swedish Naval Academy from 1896 to 1900 when he was promoted to lieutenant and then served in the Fleet Staff from 1900 to 1901. Since Riben in 1901 completed his qualification as director of a navigation school, he was between 1901 and 1903 director of the naval instrument and nautical chart repository in Stockholm as well as between 1903 and 1909 teacher of navigation, trigonometry, nautical surveying and preliminary drawing at the Royal Swedish Naval Academy with the result of yearly recurring summer service as navigation officer on cadet ships. He served in the Nautical Department of the Royal Swedish Naval Materiel Administration from 1905 to 1912 when he was promoted to lieutenant commander. In 1911 he served as 1st flag lieutenant (flaggadjutant) to the Commander-in-Chief of the Coastal Fleet. Riben was ordered to undergo torpedo training in Karlskrona and in the summer of 1912 was given command of the then equipped destroyer division, at the same time commander of the destroyer Hugin.

In the years 1912-1914, Riben held the position as head of the naval schools in Karlskrona, but due to the worrying political situation in the world and the resulting demand for increased preparedness, he came to be largely deployed during this time in his mobilization position as head of one of the Coastal Fleet's destroyer divisions. He thus served as destroyer division commander in the so-called Winter Coastal Fleet (Vinterkustflottan) in 1912–1913 based on the destroyer Wale and assumed the same command during the mobilization in August 1914, which he left the following year to take command of the armored cruiser Fylgia. Riben then served as head of the naval schools in Karlskrona from 1912 to 1914 and was promoted to commander in 1916. Riben was head of the Royal Swedish Naval Materiel Administration's Nautical Department from 1916 to 1918. Under this time, he received the honorable command as the first commander of the then completed coastal defence ship Sverige, which in 1917 set out on its first expedition. He served as head of the Royal Swedish Naval Academy from 1918 to 1921 and in 1919 he was promoted to captain and served the same year as commander of the coastal defence ship division based on Oden.

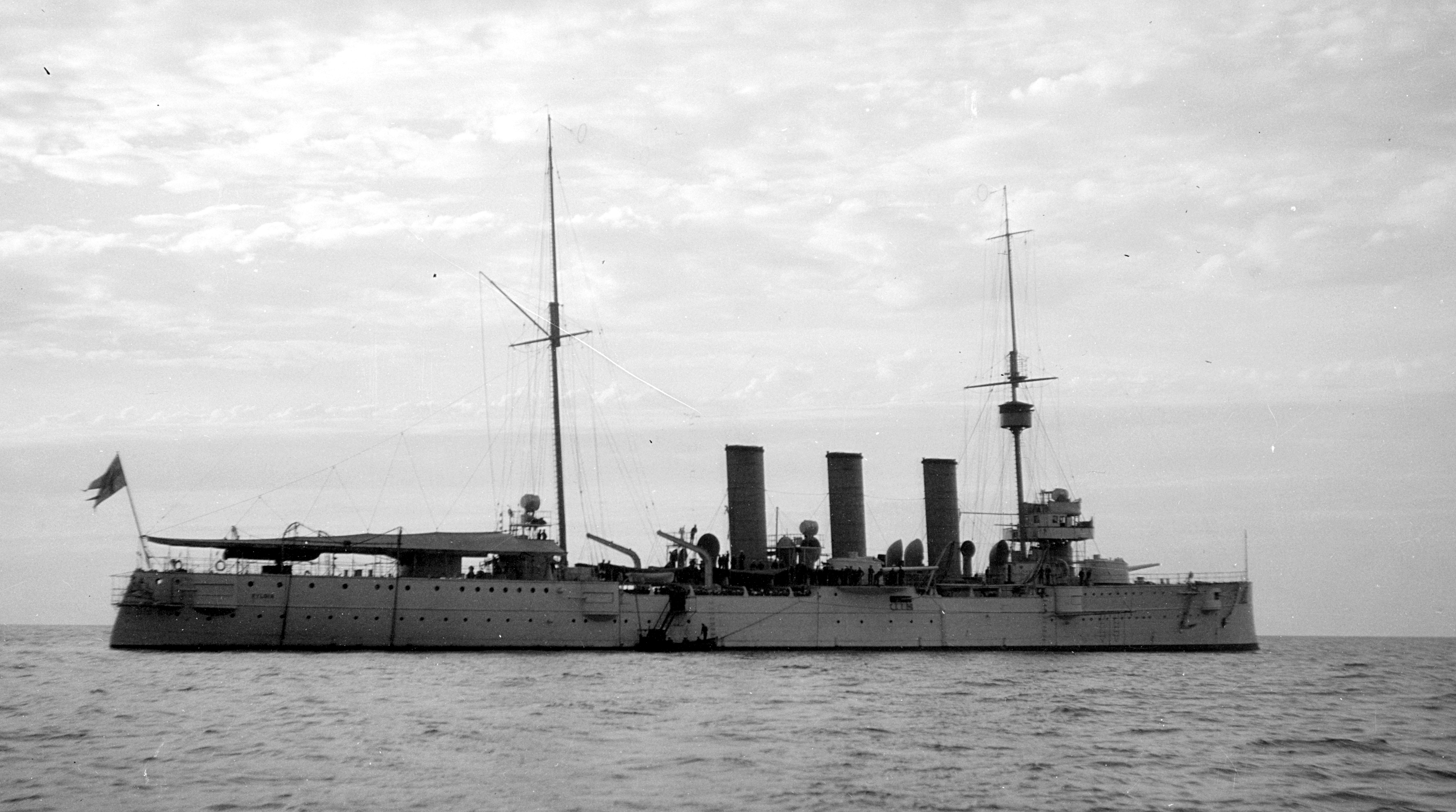
Riben was commander of the armoured cruiser Fylgia during the early years of World War I

Riben was head of the Military Office of the Minister for Naval Affairs (Sjöförsvarets kommandoexpedition) from 1921 to 1923 when he was promoted to rear admiral. He served as Commander-in-Chief of the Coastal Fleet from 1923 to 1925. His time as Commander-in-Chief of the Coastal Fleet was for this Sweden's foremost naval force a period of innovation and development, in that the rules for the Coastal Fleet's tactical behavior were tested and shaped, which were conditioned by the three new Sverige-class coastal defence ships entering service as the core of the Coastal Fleet. Riben then served as commander-in-chief of Stockholm Naval Station from 1926 to 1933, during which time he was promoted to vice admiral in 1930. Riben retired from active duty and entered the reserves in 1933.

=== Other work ===
Riben was an adviser on the organization of the central defence administration in 1921, chairman of the regulations advisers (reglementssakkunniga) in 1922, member of the League of Nations' permanent advisory military commission from 1922 to 1926, military member of the Supreme Court of Sweden from 1925 to 1933 and adviser assistant in the League of Nations' preparatory disarmament commission from 1926 to 1930.

Even after his retirement from active duty, Riben was keenly interested in his old service branch and when the naval association Flottans män was formed in 1935, he made himself available as its chairman and remained as such for ten years. He was elected chairman of the Directorate of the Swedish Nobility Foundation in 1941 succeeding Count Henning Wachtmeister who died the year before. Riben resigned four years later.

== Personal life ==
Riben married in 1892 to Hildegard Elisabeth Neumüller (1868–1899), the daughter of brewery owner Friedrich Neumüller and his wife Emma Reuszner. They had five children: Maud (1893–1932), Daisy (1894–1982), Margit (1896–1986), Sture (1898–1982), and Harriet (born and died 1899).

In 1903, Riben married Emma Catharina (Karin) Piehl (1880–1932), the daughter of the brewery director Carl Gustaf Piehl and Sofia Neumüller. They had three children: Sven (1906–1990), Dagmar (born 1907), and Karin (1914–2007).

== Death ==
Riben died on 26 April 1958 in Uddevalla on a temporary visit there. He was interred on 15 August 1950 at Sandsborgskyrkogården in Stockholm.

== Dates of rank ==
- 25 October 1889 – Underlöjtnant
- 15 May 1891 – Sub-lieutenant
- 31 December 1900 – Lieutenant
- 26 January 1912 – Lieutenant commander
- 30 June 1916 – Commander
- 7 November 1919 – Captain
- 28 February 1923 – Rear admiral
- 16 April 1930 – Vice admiral

== Awards and decorations ==
=== Swedish ===
- (Sweden) Commander Grand Cross of the Order of the Sword (6 June 1930)
- (Sweden) Commander 1st Class of the Order of the Sword (6 June 1923)
- (Sweden) Commander 2nd Class of the Order of the Sword (6 June 1922)
- (Sweden) Knight of the Order of the Sword (6 June 1910)
- (Sweden) Knight of the Order of the Polar Star (6 June 1920)

=== Foreign ===
- (Belgium) Knight of the Order of Leopold (6 July 1899)
- (Denmark) Commander 1st Class of the Order of the Dannebrog (28 July 1922)
- (Denmark) Commander 2nd Class of the Order of the Dannebrog (19 June 1919)
- (Denmark) Knight of the Order of the Dannebrog (10 July 1910)
- (Estonia) 2nd Class of the Cross of Liberty (1925)
- (Estonia) 3rd Class of the Cross of Liberty (1925)
- Grand Cross of the Order of the White Rose of Finland (July 1924)
- (France) Grand Officer of the Legion of Honour (1922)
- (France) Commander of the Legion of Honour (1922)
- (Italy) Knight of the Order of Saints Maurice and Lazarus (1892)
- (Latvia) Grand Cross of the Order of the Three Stars (1929)
- (Netherlands) Commander with sword of the Order of Orange-Nassau (1923)
- (Norway) Grand Cross of the Order of St. Olav (before 1940)
- (Poland) Grand Cross of the Order of Polonia Restituta (before 1940)
- (Portugal) Knight of the Military Order of Aviz (26 May 1898)
- (Spain) Grand Cross of the Cross of Naval Merit (1928)
- (Ottoman Empire) 5th Class of the Order of the Medjidie (January 1891)

== Honours ==
- Member of the Royal Swedish Academy of War Sciences (1913)
- Member of the Royal Swedish Society of Naval Sciences (1907)
- Honorary member of the Royal Swedish Society of Naval Sciences (1923)

Military offices
Preceded by Carl Sparre	Royal Swedish Naval Academy; 1918–1921	Succeeded by Fabian Tamm
Preceded by Otto Lybeck	Military Office of the Minister for Naval Affairs; 1921–1923	Succeeded by Harald Åkermark
Preceded by Carl Alarik Wachtmeister	Coastal Fleet; 1923–1925	Succeeded by Otto Lybeck
Preceded by Carl Alarik Wachtmeister	Stockholm Naval Station; 1926–1933	Succeeded by Charles de Champs
Professional and academic associations
Preceded by Carl Gustaf Hammarskjöld	President of the Royal Swedish Academy of War Sciences; 1933–1935	Succeeded by Ludvig Hammarskiöld
Preceded by Henning Wachtmeister	Chairman of the Directorate of the Swedish Nobility Foundation; 1940–1944	Succeeded by Eric Virgin
