= Otto Lybeck =

Swedish Navy officer

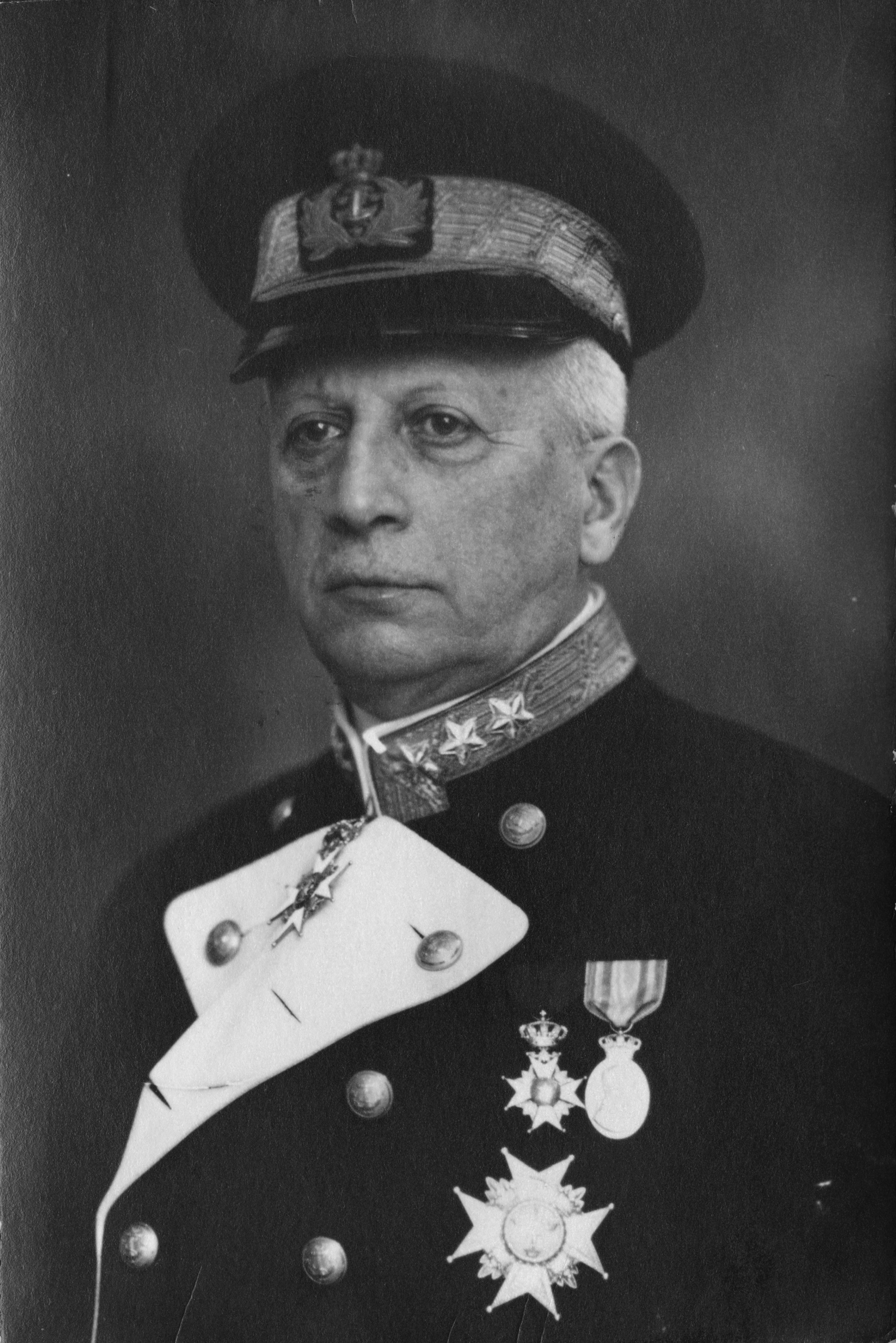
- Born: Otto Emil Lybeck; 19 February 1871; Stockholm, Sweden
- Died: 21 April 1947 (aged 76); Stockholm, Sweden
- Burial place: Norra begravningsplatsen
- Military career
- Allegiance: Sweden
- Branch: Swedish Navy
- Service years: 1892–1936
- Rank: Admiral
- Commands: Military Office, Ministry for Naval Affairs; 4th Coastal Defence Ship Division; Coastal Fleet; Chief of the Naval Staff
- Other work: Minister of Defence (1921)

Admiral Otto Emil Lybeck (19 February 1871 – 21 April 1947) was a Swedish Navy officer. Lybeck's senior commands include Minister of Defence, Commander-in-Chief of the Coastal Fleet and Chief of the Naval Staff.

== Early life ==
Lybeck was born on 19 February 1871 in Stockholm, Sweden, the son of Johan August Lybeck, a bank accountant, and his wife Emelie Carolina Sofia Klynder. Lybeck was a cadet at the Royal Swedish Naval Academy from 1886.

== Career ==
Lybeck was commissioned as an officer in the Swedish Navy with the rank of underlöjtnant in 1892. He was promoted to sub-lieutenant in 1895, and undertook language studies in Russia from 1895 to 1897, after which he served as Russian language teacher in the Naval Staff before attending the Royal Swedish Army Staff College from 1898 to 1900. He then served in the Fleet Staff for four years, and advancing to the rank of lieutenant in 1901. In 1904, he was sent to East Asia to observe the Russo-Japanese War.

He served as adjutant to the Inspector of the Navy's Exercises at Sea, captain Wilhelm Dyrssen from 1904 to 1907, and as teacher of naval organizational learning at the Royal Swedish Naval Staff College from 1905 to 1909 and of strategy from 1910 to 1918. Lybeck was naval attaché in Saint Petersburg from 1906 to 1911 and teacher of naval sciences at the Royal Swedish Army Staff College in 1908. Lybeck then served in the Naval Staff from 1909 to 1915. Several times nominated as councilor of the Naval Pension Fund (Flottans pensionskassa), Lybeck was, due to his outstanding ability and great work ability, engaged for a variety of special assignments, such as assisting the 2nd Defence Preparation in 1914, secretary of the Committee on Defence that same year, expert for special assignment within the Ministry for Civil Service Affairs in 1915, expert in the Ministry for Naval Affairs for an inquiry into wage regulation for the navy's personnel and for investigation concerning certain naval defense needs (1915–16), member of the international commission in The Hague in 1917, chief arbitrator in the international commission in Berlin concerning the treatment of raised ships in 1917, expert in arbitration in Copenhagen concerning international law cases between Germany and Denmark in 1918 and more.

Lybeck was appointed head of the Military Office of the Ministry for Naval Affairs (Sjöförsvarsdepartementets kommandoexpedition) in 1918 and from 6 June to 13 October 1921, he served as Minister of Defence and head of the Ministry of Defence. During this time, Lybeck was also a member of the Military Pay Experts (Militära avlöningssakkunniga) from 1919 to 1922 and a member of the Defense Audit (Försvarsrevisionen) from 1922 to 1923. He then served as commanding officer of the 4th Coastal Defence Ship Division (Fjärde pansarbåtsdivisionen) from 1922 to 1923 and as Inspector of the Submarine Force (Inspektör för ubåtsvapnet) in 1924. Lybeck was promoted to rear admiral in 1925 and in 1926 he was appointed Commander-in-Chief of the Coastal Fleet. In 1927, he was appointed Chief of the Naval Staff, a position Lybeck had for the next nine years. He was chairman of the Naval Teaching Commission (marinundervisningskommissionen) in 1928, and of the board of the Nautical Chart Department from 1929 to 1936. Lybeck was also chairman of the board of the Royal Swedish Yacht Club (KSSS) from 1936 to 1946 and of the Swedish Sailing Federation from 1937. He served as a member of the Committee on Stockholm's Naval Station from 1929 to 1930.

== Personal life ==
In 1902, he married Ingeborg Boström (born 1878), the daughter of the Prime Minister of Sweden, Erik Gustaf Boström, and Karolina (Lina) Almqvist. They had three children; Göran (born 1903), Brita (born 1905), and Märta (born 1908).

== Death ==
Lybeck died on 21 April 1947 in Stockholm. The funeral service was held on 25 April 1947 at Klara Church, after which cremation took place in the Chapel of the Holy Cross at Skogskrematoriet. He was later interred on 2 May 1947 at Norra begravningsplatsen in Stockholm.

== Dates of rank ==
- 29 October 1892 – Underlöjtnant
- 26 April 1895 – Sub-lieutenant
- 30 December 1901 – Lieutenant
- 11 December 1914 – Lieutenant commander
- 31 July 1917 – Commander
- 29 June 1921 – Captain
- 4 December 1925 – Rear admiral
- 9 December 1932 – Vice admiral
- 20 February 1936 – Admiral

== Awards and decorations ==
=== Swedish ===
- (Sweden) Commander Grand Cross of the Order of the Sword (16 June 1933)
- (Sweden) Commander Second Class of the Order of Vasa (15 December 1921)
- (Sweden) Knight of the Order of the Polar Star (1920)
- (Sweden) RKM
- (Sweden) Royal Swedish Yacht Club Medal of Merit in gold

=== Foreign ===
- (Netherlands) Grand Cross of the Order of Orange-Nassau with swords
- (Denmark) Grand Cross of the Order of the Dannebrog
- Commander of the Order of the White Rose of Finland
- (France) Commander of the Legion of Honour
- (Norway) Commander of the Order of St. Olav
- (Spain) 3rd Class of the Cross of Naval Merit, White Decoration (1923)
- Grand Officer of the Order of the Crown of Italy
- (Italy) Officer of the Order of Saints Maurice and Lazarus
- (Russian Empire) Knight Third Class of the Order of Saint Anna with swords
- (Russian Empire) Knight Second Class of the Order of Saint Stanislaus
- (Portugal) Knight of the Military Order of Aviz

== Honours ==
- Member of the Royal Swedish Academy of War Sciences (1918)
- Member of the Royal Swedish Society of Naval Sciences (1903)
- Honorary member of the Royal Swedish Society of Naval Sciences (1921)

== Selected bibliography ==
- Lindberg, H.; Lybeck, Otto (1908). Tre sjöslag under rysk-japanska kriget 1904–1905. Marinlitteraturföreningen, 0348-2405; 8 (in Swedish). Stockholm: Marinlitteraturföreningens förl. SELIBR 1615822.
- Lybeck, Otto (1909). Svenska sjöslag: sammanställning (in Swedish). Stockholm: Fritze. SELIBR 1615652.
- Lybeck, Otto (1913). Balkankriget 1912–1913 ur sjömilitär synpunkt: 1 karta och 32 bilder i texten. Marinlitteraturföreningen, 0348-2405; 14 (in Swedish). Stockholm: Marinlitteraturför. SELIBR 1636889.
- Lybeck, Otto (1919–1932). Allmän sjökrigshistoria omfattande tiden från ångans allmänna införande ombord å krigsfartyg omkring år 1850 (in Swedish). Stockholm. SELIBR 2056764.
- Lybeck, Otto (1943). Öresund i Nordens historia: en marinpolitisk studie / av Otto Lybeck (in Swedish). Malmö: Allhem. SELIBR 1402411.

Government offices
Preceded by Carl Gustaf Hammarskjöld	Minister of Defence; 1921–1921	Succeeded by Per Albin Hansson
Military offices
Preceded by Gustaf af Klint	Military Office of the Ministry for Naval Affairs; 1918–1921	Succeeded by None
Preceded by Fredrik Riben	Commander-in-Chief of the Coastal Fleet; 1926–1927	Succeeded by Harald Åkermark
Preceded by Henning von Krusenstierna	Chief of the Naval Staff; 1927–1936	Succeeded by Claës Lindsström
