= Går min eigen veg =

Single by Glittertind

from the album Landkjenning
- Released: May 27, 2009
- Recorded: 2009
- Genre: Folk metal
- Length: 4:36
- Label: Napalm Records
- Songwriter(s): Torbjørn Sandvik and Geirmund Simonsen
- Producer(s): Geirmund Simonsen

"Går min eigen veg" (English: Trudging my own way), written by Torbjørn Sandvik and Geirmund Simonsen and performed by Glittertind, was released as a single in 2009 from the album Landkjenning. The song got playlisted in Norway's most popular radio channel NRK P1 and is still regularly played on this radio channel.

== Appearances in other media ==
A live acoustic version of this song was recorded as a promotional for the festival Volumfestivalen in 2011.
