= Til Dovre Faller =

Studio album by Glittertind (band)
- Released: May 17, 2005
- Recorded: July–December 2004 in studio Jotunheimen Lillesand
- Genre: Folk metal, viking metal
- Length: 18:14
- Label: Karmageddon Media

Glittertind (band) chronology
Evige Asatro (2004)	Til Dovre Faller (2005)	Landkjenning (2009)

Til Dovre Faller (English: Until the mountains of Dovre falls) is the second release the Norwegian folk metal band Glittertind. It was released on Norway's constitution day, May 17, 2005 through Karmageddon Media, 100 years after Norway's independence from Sweden in 1905. The record was originally intended to be a full-length album. However, to reach the deadline for this symbolic release-date it came out as a seven-track mini-album.

The record was dedicated to freedom, democracy and the people fighting for it throughout the years of Norwegian history. Norway got its constitution in 1814 and this album lasts for 18 minutes and 14 seconds in total - 18:14. The expression "Until the Mountains of Dovre Falls" was something the people who wrote the constitution swore to each other when signing it.

Finntroll member Skrymer did the cover-artwork and Finntroll member Trollhorn played synths on this record. All other instruments were handled by Torbjørn Sandvik.

== Statement in 2009 re-release ==
In the beginning of the album booklet for the 2009 re-release, the following political statement is made:

”Til Dovre Faller” or ”Until Dovre Falls” was released in 2005 to celebrate Norwegian freedom fighters through the ages – to celebrate those who fought the Christian aggression during the Viking age, those who fought for an independent state between 1814 and 1905 and to celebrate those who fought against the Nazis during the second world war. But most important, it was released to inspire people who fight against the profit motivated globalization and the extreme capaitalists work for standardization of consumer needs. The opposite of this is to promote cultural diversity in Europe and the rest of the Word – not to gather everyone under the same brands.

The price for the capitalistic globalization is paid every day by the working class – for every farm which has to close, for every job that is flagging out, for every man who daily hears that only people with high education has a value in a competitive market. “Til Dovre Faller” was released to give my full solidarity and recognition of the Norwegian and European working class struggle today and through the ages!

The MCD was released 100 years after the Norwegian independence from Sweden and to counterbalance politician’s conventional celebration of this jubilee. While celebrating independence, politicians were at the same time working strategically to gain the extreme capitalist’s power. Every day they were promoting a policy which includes selling out state values which belong to everyone. In particular, the same people are EU-advocates committed to the so called neo liberalism. The fruit of this ideology is seen in the financial crisis of today. Only a state can take care of the rights of its people. This has its simple reason: The state is democratically voted by its members and workers. The property of the state is thus the property of the people. If we give our democratic controlled values and power to the capitalists, we are taking from the poor and giving to the rich. A freedom fighter should be doing the opposite and work for social justice!

This re-release of “Til Dovre Faller” will make this record available for a long time. I hope it can continue to inspire the European working class citizen’s fight against the culture of greediness which drives the extreme capitalists!

Loyal and faithful until Dovre falls!

— Torbjørn Sandvik - Til Dovre Faller album booklet re-release 2009

== Track listing ==
No.	Title	Translation	Length
1.	"For Norge, Kjempers Fødeland"	For Norway, Home of the Brave	0:32
2.	"Flaumen går, i Noreg er vår"	Rivers are flowing, Norway is growing	2:25
3.	"Rolandskvadet"	Song of Roland	4:18
4.	"Norge i rødt, hvitt og blått"	Norway in Red, White and Blue	3:04
5.	"Per Spelmanns bane"	The Death of the Fidler	1:47
6.	"Svart natt"	Black Night	3:21
7.	"The Battle of Stiklestad"	The Battle of Stiklestad	2:45
Total length:			18:14
