= Evige Asatro =

Studio album by Glittertind
- Released: May 27, 2004
- Recorded: July–December 2002 at studio Jotunheim Lillesand
- Genres: Folk metal, viking metal
- Length: 41:14
- Label: Karmageddon Media

Glittertind chronology
Evige Asatro (2004)	Til Dovre Faller (2005)

Evige Asatro (English: Eternal Asatru) is the first full-length album by the Norwegian folk metal band Glittertind, released on May 27, 2004 through Karmageddon Media. Torbjørn Sandvik handles all instruments on this record.

The title "Eternal Asatru" was taken from the last part of the non-finished opera Olav Tryggvason composed by Edvard Grieg and written by Bjørnstjerne Bjørnson. The opera is about Olav Tryggvason's unsuccessful attempt to christianize Norway. Because the opera was never finished, it ends with the victory of the Norse religion over Christianity.

Skrymer from Finntroll did the artwork and band logo for this album.

== Statement in 2009 re-release ==
In the beginning of the 2009 re-release album booklet, the following statement is made:

Motivated by a strong anger towards the political Christianity, I recorded “Evige Asatro”, seventeen year old, and released it on the Swedish label “Ultima Thule Records” in 2002. I felt bitterness over thousand year old historical occurrences. I re-experienced the injustice in which the political Christianity practiced upon so called heathen religions in Europe around year 700. I saw a line of injustice from the Christianization of Norway, to witch burning and the colony époque. I hated the Christian double standard of morality where they promoted on one side, the worth of Man, and on the other side they practiced, intolerance, murderer and violence.

This anger made me travel back in time in search for the genuine, pre-Christian national character, and I found a lot of inspiration from the 1800s which was dominated by a national romantic cultural elite. I blew the dust of a lot of old books where old songs with the right hefty beat were written down. I was not ashamed at all to bring life to this old cultural tradition. By mixing this with an inspiration from hard rock and folk music, “Evige Asatro” was born.

The music and my expression captured the attention of “Karmageddon Media” and the album was re-released on their label in 2004. With this deal taken care of, distribution and promotion in Europe was a fact. To my big surprise “Evige Asatro” received great critics from the international metal press. The album was recorded at my parent’s house, in my room, and every bit of the production was done by me, alone. Accordingly my expectations were low, but I was wrong.

Today you are holding the third re-release of “Evige Asatro” on a third label – Napalm Records. Karmageddon Media went bankrupt and the album has unfortunately been unavailable for a long time now. This last re-release will hopefully make the album available a good while. “Evige Asatro” reflects my thoughts, beliefs and ideas as a passionate and highly committed seventeen year old – I hope you will enjoy it!

— Torbjørn Sandvik - Evige Asatro re-release 2009 album-booklet

== Track listing ==
No.	Title	Translation	Length
1.	"Lindisfarne - 793"	Lindisfarne - 793	1:57
2.	"Karl den Store"	Charles the Great	2:45
3.	"Sønner av Norge"	Sons of Norway	2:52
4.	"En stille morgen"	One silent morning 1349	3:31
5.	"Fjellheimen gir meg fred"	My Home of Peaceful Mountains	4:06
6.	"Olav Digre"	The fat Olav II of Norway	3:39
7.	"Nordmannen"	The Norseman	2:14
8.	"Frostriket"	Kingdom of Frost	4:08
9.	"Evige Asatro"	Eternal Asatru	3:27
10.	"Se Norges Blomsterdal"	Look, the Valleys of Norway is Blooming	2:43
11.	"Om Kvelden (En liten vise)"	In the Evening	3:56
12.	"Skumring"	At Dusk	3:01
13.	"Norges Skaal"	A Cheers to Norway	2:55
Total length:			41:14
