= John Schneidler =

Swedish Navy officer (1868–1958)

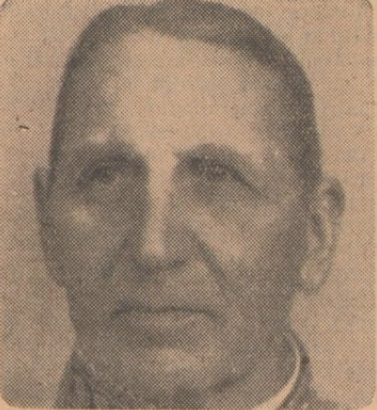
- Born: John Christoffer Schneidler; 4 June 1868; Stockholm, Sweden
- Died: 26 April 1958 (aged 89); Stockholm, Sweden
- Burial place: Galärvarvskyrkogården
- Military career
- Branch: Swedish Navy
- Service years: 1888–1933
- Rank: Vice Admiral
- Commands: HSwMS Mode; HSwMS Oscar II; HSwMS Wasa; Royal Swedish Naval Staff College; Karlskrona Naval Yard; Royal Swedish Naval Materiel Administration
- Conflicts: Invasion of Åland

Vice Admiral John Christoffer Schneidler (4 June 1868 – 26 April 1958) was a senior Swedish Navy officer. He served as head of the Royal Swedish Naval Staff College from 1919 to 1923, commander of Karlskrona Naval Yard from 1923 to 1925 and as head of the Royal Swedish Naval Materiel Administration from 1925 to 1933.

== Early life ==
Schneidler was born on 4 June 1868 in Stockholm, Sweden, the son of Carl Edvard Schneidler, a bookbinder and stationer, and his wife Amalia Carolina Fredrika Granström. He had two brothers; Herman Gustaf Schneidler, a merchant, and Edvard Schneidler, a wholesaler. John Schneidler was great-grandson to the bookbinder and craftsman Christopher Schneidler.

== Career ==
Schneidler was commissioned as a naval officer with the rank of underlöjtnant in the Swedish Navy in 1888 and was promoted to sub-lieutenant in 1890. He attended the Royal Swedish Army Staff College from 1892 to 1894. A few years later he was flag lieutenant (flaggadjutant) in the Coastal Squadron (Kusteskadern), in 1896 on the coastal defence ship Göta and the following year on the then new coastal defence ship Oden. Schneidler served in the Fleet Staff from 1895 to 1911 and was adjutant to the chief of staff from 1898 to 1904. He was promoted to lieutenant in 1899. Schneidler served as a teacher of the art of naval warfare at the Royal Swedish Naval Academy between 1902 and 1907 and as a teacher of the same at the Royal Swedish Army Staff College between 1905 and 1908. During the peaceful settlement with Norway in 1905, he was commander of the destroyer HSwMS Mode. Between 1905 and 1919 Schneidler was captain and division commander on destroyers and captain of the coastal defence ships HSwMS Oscar II och HSwMS Wasa. He participated in the invasion of Åland in 1918 as captain of Oscar II.

In the years 1907–1911, he held the position as naval attaché in London and Paris, but during this period he participated in several naval expeditions and in Christian Leonard Tenow's inquiry concerning the simplification of the navy's accounting system. Promoted to lieutenant commander in 1911, Schneidler was appointed naval adviser in the Royal Thai Navy the same year, and during this special service he and his wife lived in Bangkok. In the summer of 1914, he was the commander of a destroyer division, and he was promoted to commander in 1915. Schneidler was chief of staff to the commanding admiral in Karlskrona from 1914 to 1917. He was promoted to captain in 1919 and was appointed head of the Royal Swedish Naval Staff College. From 1921 to 1922 Schneidler served as division commander of the coastal defence ship division and as flag captain of the Coastal Fleet. He was appointed head of Karlskrona Naval Yard in 1923 and was promoted to rear admiral in 1925 when he took up the position of head of the Royal Swedish Naval Materiel Administration. He retired and was promoted to vice admiral in 1933.

Schneidler also held several special assignments; among other things, he was chairman of the navy's organizational advisers from 1925 to 1929.

== Later life ==
Schneidler became a member of the Order of Neptune in 1895. He was its chairman for 25 years until March 1953. He was succeeded by Captain Daniel Landquist. He was a member of the Föreningen 1868 års män ("Association of Men of 1868") until its closure in October 1954.

== Personal life ==
In April 1900, Schneidler got engaged to Countess Sigrid Louise Axeline Cronhielm af Hakunge (1878–1974), the daughter of naval captain, Count Axel Cronhielm and Ebba Kreüger. They married on 16 February 1902 in Skeppsholmen Church in Stockholm. To the tune of Felix Mendelssohn's march from "A Midsummer Night's Dream" performed by the small band of the Swedish Navy, the bride and groom entered, escorted by two marshals, the sub-lieutenant of the navy, Göran af Klercker and the volunteer of the Life Guards of Horse Count Axel Cronhielm. The wedding was performed by the regimental chaplain Gemzell. The wedding was witnessed by the Prince and Princess Bernadotte, the cabinet minister Gerhard Dyrssen and Mrs Dyrssen, vice admiral Hjalmar af Klintberg and Mrs af Klintberg, rear admirals Fredrik Lennman and Louis Palander with wives, count and countess Ruuth, and royal navy officers in the city with their wives and others.

Their first son, Carl Axel Christoffer Schneidler was born on 7 December 1901, and died on 17 June 1921 in Karlskrona at the age of 19. Their second son, John Sten Edward Schneidler was born on 10 March 1903, and died on 13 November 1994. Their daughter Mary Mathilda was born on 1 December 1908 and died less than a year later on 11 November 1909. A third son, Bernt Gustaf Schneidler, was born on 22 September 1915 in Karlskrona and was as a sub-lieutenant in the Swedish Naval Quartermaster Corps. He died on 14 March 1944 in Stockholm. A fourth son, Joost Christoffer ("Christer") Schneidler was born on 27 October 1918 and died on 13 July 1946 in Stockholm.

== Death ==
Schneidler died on 26 April 1958 in Stockholm. The funeral service was held on 4 May 1958 at Skeppsholmen Church in Stockholm. Schneidler was laid to rest by Admiralty Chaplain G. Brandt. Among those present was the Chief of the Navy, Vice Admiral Stig H:son Ericson and the commander of the Naval Command East, Rear Admiral Erik af Klint. Former Chief of the Navy, Vice Admiral Helge Strömbäck was also present at the funeral together with Rear Admiral Nils Wijkmark and Rear Admiral Gösta Odqvist. The choir of the Order of Neptune under the direction of music director S. Möller sang works by Edvard Grieg. The soloist was Carl Skylling. He was interred on 4 June 1958 at Galärvarvskyrkogården in Stockholm.

== Dates of rank ==
- 1888 – Underlöjtnant
- 1890 – Sub-lieutenant
- 1899 – Lieutenant
- 1910 – Lieutenant commander
- 1915 – Commander
- 1919 – Captain
- 1925 – Rear admiral
- 1932 – Vice admiral

== Awards and decorations ==
=== Swedish ===
- (Sweden) Commander Grand Cross of the Order of the Sword (6 June 1935)
- (Sweden) Commander 1st Class of the Order of the Sword (19 September 1925)
- (Sweden) Knight of the Order of the Sword (1909)
- (Sweden) Knight of the Order of the Polar Star (1918)
- (Sweden) Knight 1st Class of the Order of Vasa (1906)

=== Foreign ===
- (Latvia) Grand Cross of the Order of the Three Stars
- (Thailand) 2nd Class of the Order of the Crown of Siam with star
- (Denmark) Commander of the Order of the Dannebrog
- (France) Commander of the Order of the Black Star
- (France) Officer of the Legion of Honour
- (Russian Empire) Knight 3rd Class of the Order of Saint Stanislaus
- (Denmark) 5th Class of the Order of the Medjidie

== Honours ==
- Member of the Royal Swedish Academy of War Sciences (1911)
- Member of the Royal Swedish Society of Naval Sciences (1904)
- Honorary member of the Royal Swedish Society of Naval Sciences (1925)

== Bibliography ==
- Schneidler, John (1895). Den svenska flottan och dess uppgift vid fosterlandets försvar. Föreningen Heimdals folkskrifter, 99-1250994-3; 29/30 (in Swedish). Stockholm: Beijer. SELIBR 1622673.

Military offices
Preceded by Carl Engström	Royal Swedish Naval Staff College; 1919–1923	Succeeded by Gustaf Starck
Preceded by Albert Fallenius	Karlskrona Naval Yard; 1923–1925	Succeeded by Karl Wester
Preceded by Henry Lindberg	Royal Swedish Naval Materiel Administration; 1925–1932	Succeeded by Harald Åkermark
