= Glittertind (band) =

Norwegian indie folk rock band

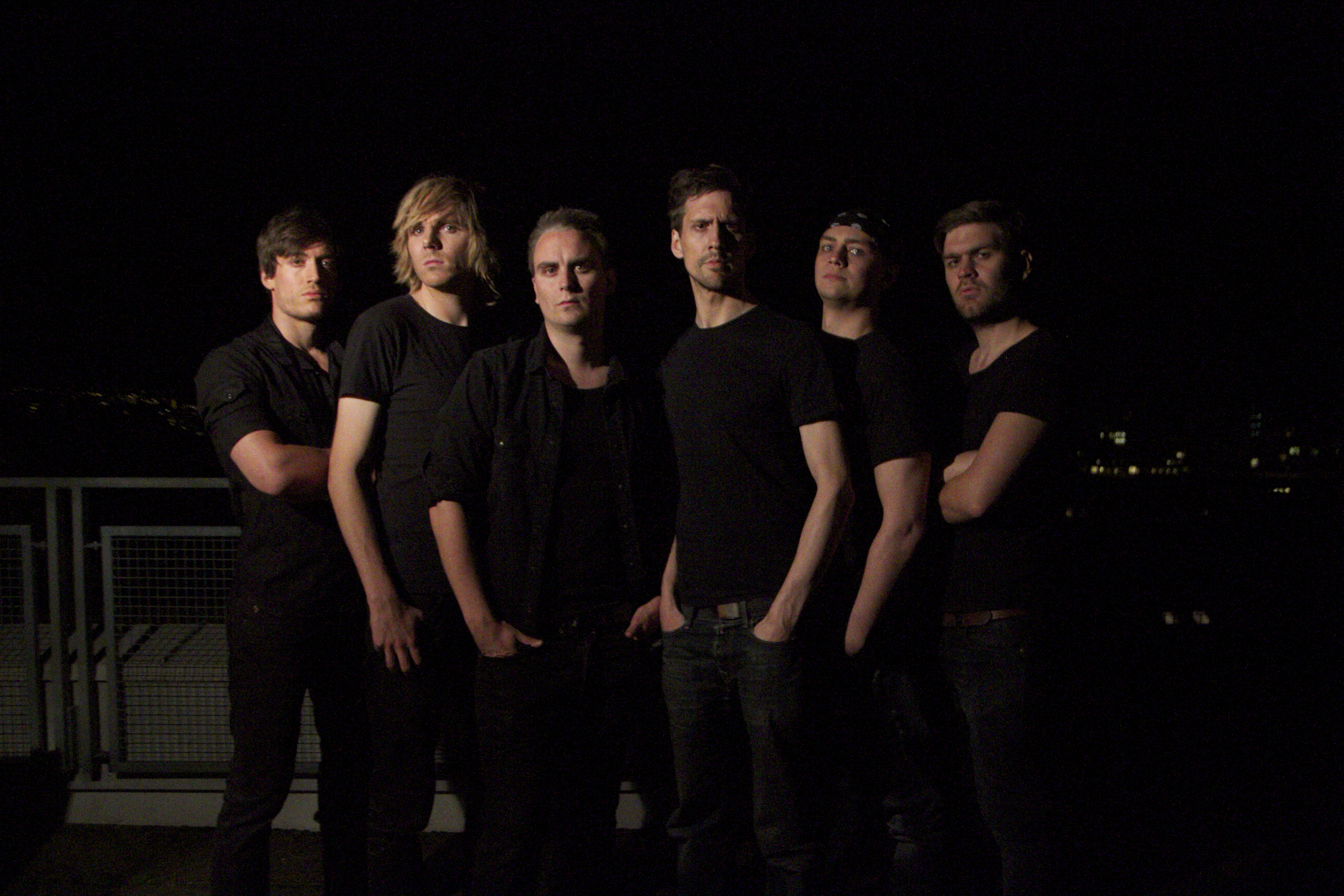
- Photo of Glittertind autumn 2013

Background information
- Origin: Lillesand, Oslo, Norway
- Genres: Folk rock Punk rock Viking metal (early material)
- Years active: 2001–present
- Labels: Indie Recordings; Napalm Records; Karmageddon Media; Ultima Thule Records
- Members: Torbjørn Sandvik - Vocals and guitar Geirmund Simonsen - Guitar, vocals, synth, programming Stefan Theofilakis - Flutes, vocals Geir Holm - Drums; Bjørn Nordstoga - Bass; Olav Aasbø - Guitar
- Website: http://www.glittertind.net

Glittertind is a Norwegian indie folk-rock band, which started up as a one-man project in 2001 featuring Torbjørn Sandvik as the driving force. In 2010, the band had a full line-up that consisted of Sandvik doing vocals and rhythm-guitar, Geirmund Simonsen playing accordion, rhythm-guitars, programming, Stefan Theofilakis on flutes, Geir Holm on drums, Olav Aasbø on lead-guitar, and Bjørn Nordstoga on bass.

== Biography ==
Glittertind started out as a one-man project where Torbjørn Sandvik released Evige Asatro (2004) and Til Dovre Faller (2005) on the Dutch label Karmageddon Media. The records were inspired by the big narratives in history and the music mixed elements from punk, heavy metal and folk. In 2008, Geirmund Simonsen became a part of the project. Simonsen had a background as a church-organist, producer and composer for theatre, film and TV which was very different from Sandvik's background from mainly punk and metal bands. Together they thought this could result in something unique. In 2009 they released the album Landkjenning (2009) on Napalm Records (Universal Germany).

In 2010, Glittertind became a full band, and in 2013 the band released Djevelsvart, their first record on a Norwegian label (Indie Recordings). The album was inspired by writers from the 19th century who wrote something about what it means to be a modern man. During the work with the album, Torbjørn's girlfriend got life-threatening cancer, and he found great comfort in feeling a sense of common despair with these writers from the 19th century. Also the collective loss of meaning and innocence in Norway after the July 22 terror attacks influenced the album. The song "Sprekk for sol" (Burst by Sun) was dedicated to one of the Utøya victims, Torjus Jakobsen Blattmann, and his engagement against hate ideologies. With their record the band hoped to communicate that people are not so alone in their suffering as they sometimes think.

Djevelsvart received great reviews by the Norwegian daily press. The Norwegian equivalent to BBC Radio 1, NRK P1, A-listed the single "Kvilelaus" and the band had their TV debut on that station. Afterwards Glittertind topped the Norwegian iTunes album list for several days. The record also received great reviews in British rock press. Kerrang! gave 4/5 K!s and described Djevelsvart as "A real folk-rock rarity; stridently progressive, strikingly singular."

With their upcoming record, Blåne for blåne (eng. Blue Distance), their second album as a full band, Glittertind continues their journey in historical moods. Where their debut album in 2013, Djevelsvart (eng. Devil Black), explored the religious loss of meaning after Darwin, and the transition to modernity during the 19th century, Blåne for blåne is inspired by 1945 when peace came 70 years ago. The war showed man from its most destructive and ruthless sides. But with these dark forces a strong counter-force emerged and values like freedom, social justice, tolerance and solidarity became more apparent for people than ever. These forces contributed to the rebuilding of Europe and gave birth to its welfare states. The ability the war-generation had to create new meaning after traumas and loss of meaning has inspired the work with Blåne for blåne.

This ability also resonated with personal processes in songwriter and front-figure Torbjørn Sandvik. Where the predecessor Djevelsvart was dominated by anxiety and darkness and an overwhelming fear of losing a loved one because of sickness, Blåne for blåne revolves around dreams of creating a new and more vital life together – to find a path from storm and darkness to calm seas. The album has also songs that remind listeners that a loved generation and their culture are disappearing. The song "Enno nær" (Still Close) is dedicated to Torbjørn's grandmother and to the fishermen's wives who earlier were the "glue" in the Norwegian coastal society. The song "Draumen" (The Dream) is describing a meeting between Torbjørn and Per Sivle's poem "Vår-von" (Spring Hope), from the 19th century.

To support the lyrical moods the band has revitalized their musical expression from the dark and heavy predecessor, Djevelsvart. Blåne for blåne is given a lighter, acoustic expression and the Anglo-American cultural influences after 1945 on Norway are represented in the compositions. The band plays around with different instruments and elements from Nordic folk-tunes, a classic-Romantic tradition and Anglo-American indie-folkrock.

Their first radio single, "Høyr min song (Til Fridomen)" ("Hear My Song (To Freedom)", was released January 9 and A-listed by NRK P1, Norway's biggest radio station.

== Discography ==
=== Albums ===
- Mellom Bakkar Og Berg (demo) (Ultima Thule Records, 2002) CD
- Evige Asatro (demo) (Ultima Thule Records, 2003) CD
- Evige Asatro (Karmageddon Media, 2004) CD
- Til Dovre Faller (Karmageddon Media, 2005) CD
- Evige Asatro / Til Dovre Faller 2CD (Napalm Records, 2009) Double CD
- Landkjenning (Napalm Records, 2009) CD
- Djevelsvart (Indie Recordings, 2013) CD/LP
- Blåne for blåne (Indie Recordings, 2015) CD/LP
- Himmelfall (2017) CD

=== Compilations ===
- Carolus Rex 5 (Ultima Thule Records, 2001) CD
- Carolus Rex 6 (Ultima Thule Records, 2002) CD
- Carolus Rex 7 (Ultima Thule Records, 2004) CD
- Nothing Burns like Napalm Vol II (Napalm Records) 2009 CD
- Fear Candy 68 (Terrorizer) 2009 CD
- Metal Hammer No. 193: Battle Metal VIII (Metal Hammer) 2009 CD
- Sweden Rock Magazine No. 62 (Sweden Rock Magazine) 2009 CD
- Christmas Carnage Vol. 1 (Indie Recordings) 2013 CD

== Members ==
- Torbjørn Sandvik - Vocals, bass, guitar, drums, keyboards
- Geirmund Simonsen - Guitars, bass, drums, accordion, organ
- Stefan Theofilakis - Flutes, low whistle, vocals
- Bjørn Nordstoga - Bass
- Olav Aasbø - Guitar, vocals
- Geir Holm - Drums, percussion
