= Landkjenning =

Studio album by Glittertind
- Released: May 27, 2009
- Recorded: July–December 2008 at Snowflakes studios Oslo
- Genres: Folk metal, viking metal
- Length: 36:29
- Label: Napalm Records

Glittertind chronology
Til Dovre Faller (2005)	Landkjenning (2009)

Landkjenning (English: Land sighting) is the second full-length album by the Norwegian folk rock band Glittertind, released on May 27, 2009 through Napalm Records. All instruments and vocals were done by Torbjørn Sandvik and Geirmund Simonsen except the following instruments handled by session members: Harding fiddle by Erlend Viken, flutes by Stefan Theofilakis and cello by Kaja Fjellberg Pettersen. The cover-artwork was done by Kris Verwimp and the cover-layout by Julien Riesen.

This album entered the domestic chart result in Norway on position #20. The song Går min eigen veg was listed in Norway's most popular radio channel NRK P1.

The songs of the album have been compared to the music of Falkenbach and Fiddler's Green.

== Concept of the album ==
In the beginning of the album booklet, an English statement explains the concept of Landkjenning. Glittertind utilizes the conflict between Christianity and Norse religion thousand years ago as an entrance in understanding the dehumanizing nature of the clash between ideologies in general. They underscore that benign motives do not necessarily lead to benign actions:

Our Norse forefathers' encounter with this "modern" civilization, was far from what we would now consider civilized: Christianity was thrust upon Norway on many cases by brute force. Those who stood firm by their Norse beliefs were persecuted, tortured and killed.

— Glittertind - Landkjenning album booklet 2009

There is some sort of perspectivism in their message, and they don't appear to conclude on the issue of the Christianization of Norway in their statement. Instead, they appear to both take the Christian and Norse viewpoints into an account and end up just posing open questions:

[..]we wish to present lyrics which consider two viewpoints of these events. We present various national romantic texts written by Bjørnstjerne Bjørnson amongst others. We also present our own inspired depiction of how our Norse forefathers experienced these events. Did some of them consider the forced change as necessary; or were they wholly uncompromising in their struggle for the old culture and beliefs?

— Glittertind - Landkjenning album booklet 2009

In addition to the enlightenment of the Christianization from two viewpoints, they wish to re-arrange old folk songs and see it as a mission to defeat the forgetting of these songs:

Instead of letting these songs we worn and torn by time's passing, we have humbly tried to breathe new life into this great heritage.

— Glittertind - Landkjenning album booklet 2009

== Track listing ==
No.	Title	Lyrics	Music	Translation	Length
1.	"Landkjenning"	Bjørnstjerne Bjørnson	Edvard Grieg	Land-sighting	5:06
2.	"Nordafjells"			Nordafjells	5:12
3.	"Varder i brann"			Beacons burning	3:59
4.	"Går min eigen veg"			Trudging my own way	4:36
5.	"Longships and mead"			Longships and mead	2:58
6.	"Glittertind"			Glittertind	3:09
7.	"Jeg snører min sekk"			Getting my backpack ready	2:38
8.	"Mot myrke vetteren"			Towards the Dark Winter	4:01
9.	"Brede seil over Nordsjø går"			Sails of the Northsea Blowing	2:49
10.	"Overmåte full av nåde"	Bjørnstjerne Bjørnson	Rikard Nordraak	Exceedingly Full of Grace	2:01
Total length:					36:29
