= Näsby Castle =

Building in Sweden

Coordinates: 59°25′27″N 18°05′12″E

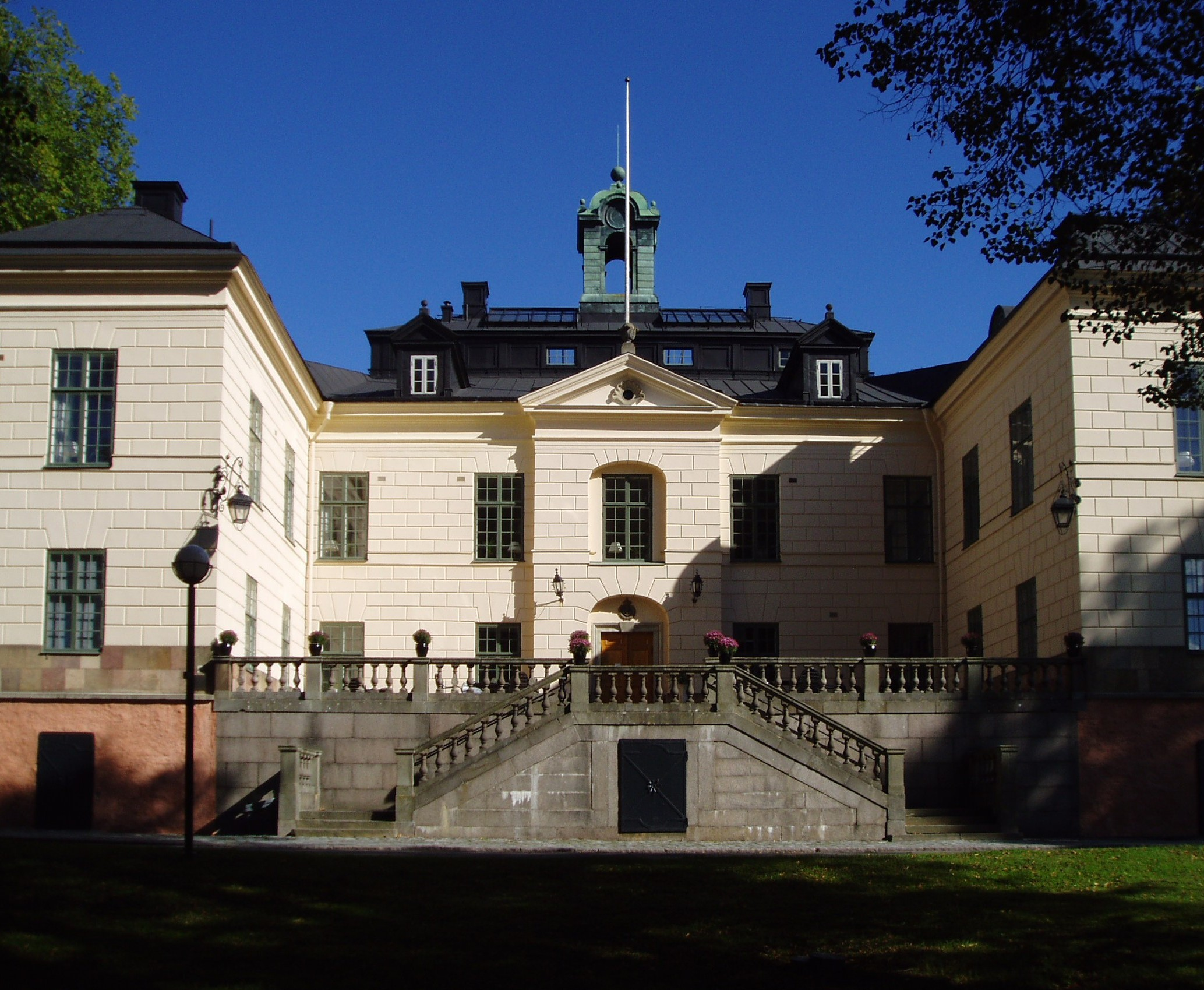
Näsby Manor in September 2011.

Näsby Manor is a manor located in Täby municipality, north of Stockholm.

Originally built in the 1660s and designed by Nicodemus Tessin the Elder, Näsby Manor is located in the picturesque and natural setting of Näsbyviken. The manor was burned to the ground in 1897, but was rebuilt according to the original design on the initiative of Carl Robert Lamm and Dora Lamm in 1903–1904. Parts of the old manor garden still exist and are well preserved.
