= HSwMS Fylgia =

Swedish armored cruiser

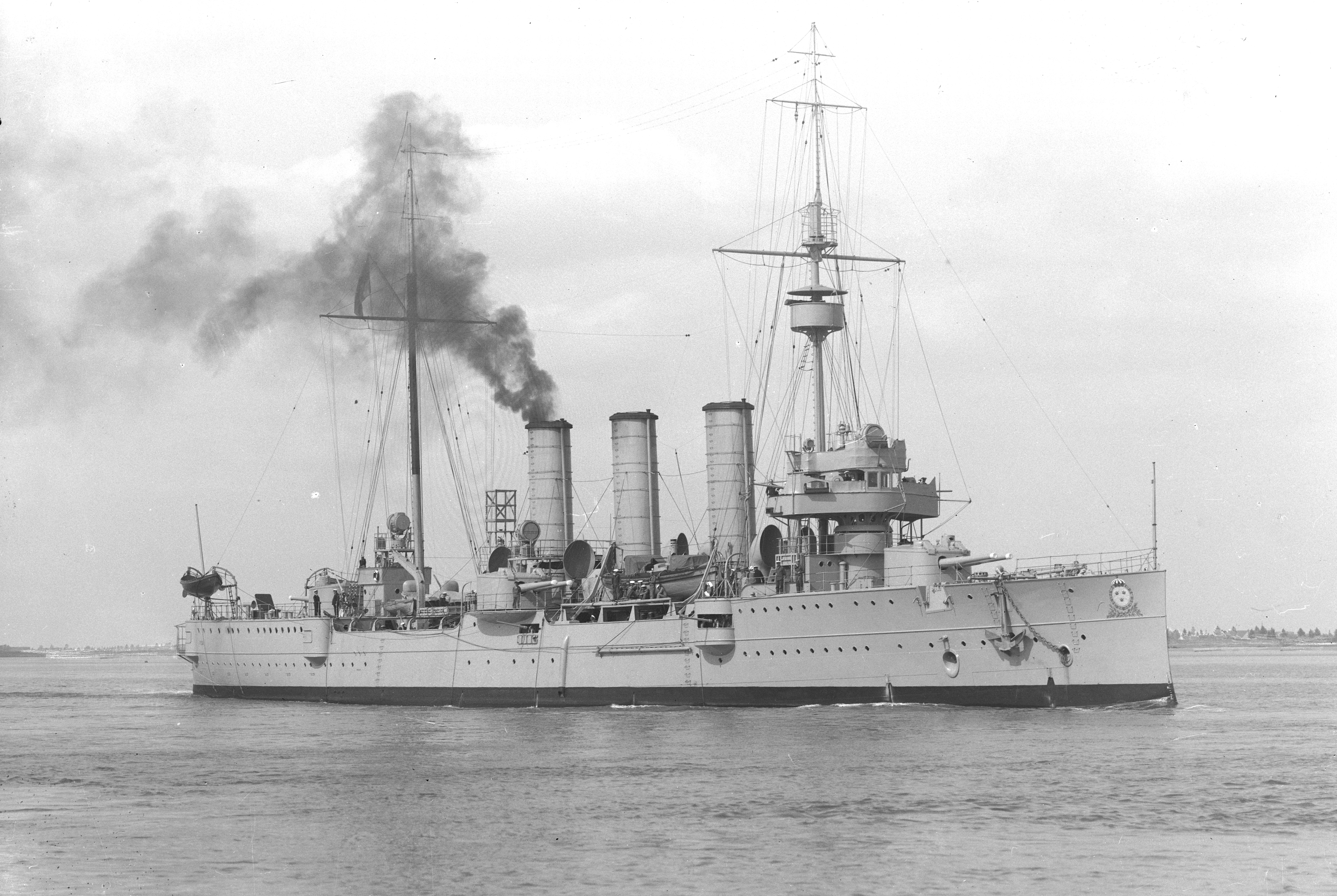
- HSwMS Fylgia

History

Sweden
- Name: Fylgia
- Builder: Bergsunds Mekaniska Verkstad, Finnboda slip
- Laid down: October 1902
- Launched: 20 December 1905
- Commissioned: 21 June 1907
- Out of service: 1 January 1953
- Fate: Sold for scrap in 1957

General characteristics
- Type: Cruiser
- Displacement: 4,310 / 4,980 tons
- Length: 117 m (383 ft 10 in)
- Beam: 14.8 m (48 ft 7 in)
- Draft: 6.3 m (20 ft 8 in)
- Installed power: 12,000 ihp (8,900 kW)
- Propulsion: Steam triple expansion, 2 screws
- Speed: 22 knots (41 km/h)
- Range: 8,000 nmi (15,000 km) at 10 knots (19 km/h)
- Complement: 322
- Armament: Design; 8 × 152 mm/50cal. Bofors M/1903; 14 × 57 mm/48cal. QF M/1889; (10 in casemates); 2 × 37 mm/39cal. cannons M/1898B; 2 × 45 cm torpedo tubes M/1904; Mine rails (max 100 mines); WWI; 8 × 152 mm/50cal. Bofors M/1903; 10 × 57 mm/48cal. QF M/1889; (6 in casemates); 2 × 57 mm/55cal. AA M/1889B; 2 × 37 mm/39cal. cannons M/1898B; 2 × 45 cm torpedo tubes M/1904; WWII; 8 × 152 mm/50cal. Bofors M/1903; 4 × 57 mm/55cal. AA M/89B-38B; 4 × 40 mm/56cal. Bofors AA M/1936; 2 × 25 mm/58cal. Bofors AA M/1932; 1 × 20 mm/66cal. Bofors AA M/1940; 2 × 53 cm torpedo tubes; 2 depth charge throwers
- Armour: Side belt 100 mm (3.9 in); Turrets 50–125 mm (2.0–4.9 in); Deck 22–35 mm (0.87–1.38 in); Conning tower 100 mm

HSwMS Fylgia was an armored cruiser of the Swedish Navy. Launched in 1905, the ship was in service until 1953. The cruiser was primarily used as a training ship for naval cadets.

== Construction and career ==
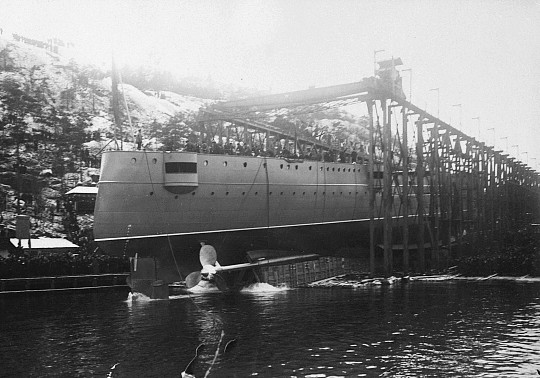
Fylgia being launched

Fylgia's keel was laid by Bergsunds Mekaniska Verkstad in October 1902. She was launched on 20 December 1905 at Finnboda slip at Nacka. The ship was commissioned on 21 June 1907. Upon her commissioning, she was the smallest true armored cruiser in the world. She was commonly used as a cadet training ship following World War I.

On 12 December 1927, Fylgia collided with the Brazilian cargo ship SS Itapura at Salvador, Bahia, Brazil. Itapura sank, but all 40 members of her crew were rescued.

=== Extensive Modernisation ===
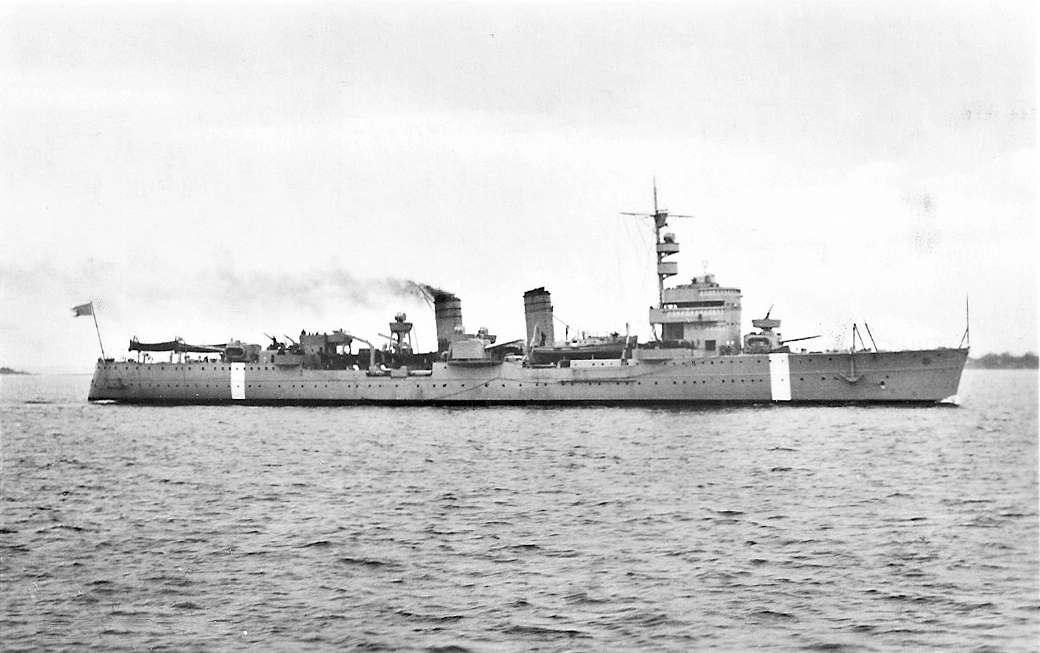
Fylgia after the 1939-40 modernisation

Fylgia was modernized in 1939–1940. Her 12 coal fired Yarrow-type boilers were replaced with four oil fueled Phenoët-type boilers. The three high stacks were replaced by two lower ones. The main battery's range was extended and a new fire control with central gun control was added. The air defense was completely revamped: the old 57 mm guns were removed and replaced with four 57 mm M/89B-38B anti-aircraft guns. Two dual 40 mm m/36 gyro-stabilized mounts were added and one dual 25 mm m/32 and one 20 mm m/40 guns were also installed.

After the refit she was assigned to the neutrality watch. Fylgia served into the 1950s as a cadet training ship, until 1953 when she was decommissioned. Fylgia was sold for scrap in 1957.

== Captains ==
- 1915–1916: Fredrik Riben
- 1919–1920: Gunnar Unger
- 1922–1923: Claës Lindsström
- 1925–1925: Nils Åkerblom
- 1925–1926: Arvid Hägg
- 1927–1928: Nils Åkerblom
- 1931–1932: Lave Beck-Friis
- 1933–1934: Magnus von Arbin
- 1948–1948: Gunnar Fogelberg
