= Harald Åkermark =

Swedish Navy officer

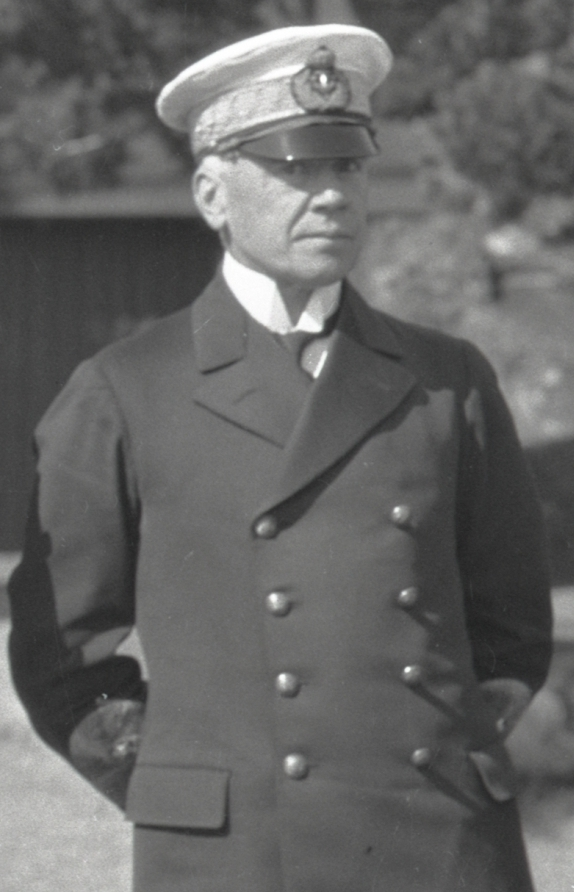
- Born: Carl Harald Åkermark; 2 September 1873; Gothenburg, Sweden
- Died: 1 November 1963 (aged 90); Stockholm, Sweden
- Burial place: Galärvarvskyrkogården, Stockholm
- Military career
- Branch: Swedish Navy
- Service years: 1894–1938, 1939–1942
- Rank: Vice Admiral
- Commands: HSwMS Drottning Victoria; Military Office of the Minister for Naval Affairs; Coastal Fleet; Royal Swedish Naval Materiel Administration; West Coast Naval District
- Conflicts: Åland Expedition

Vice Admiral Carl Harald Åkermark (12 September 1873 – 1 November 1963) was a senior Swedish Navy officer. Entering the Royal Swedish Naval Academy at 15, he began his career as a commissioned officer in 1894 and was promoted to sub-lieutenant in 1897. He served on numerous vessels, including the gunboats Skuld and Skäggald and the coastal defense ship HSwMS Drottning Victoria. Åkermark commanded the Åland Expedition in 1918 and played a significant role in developing torpedo warfare, heading the Torpedo Department and later the Torpedo School.

Promoted to captain in 1923, he served as head of the Military Office of the Minister for Naval Affairs and contributed to naval policy reforms. In 1927, he became a rear admiral and Commander-in-Chief of the Coastal Fleet, overseeing operations until 1933. He subsequently headed the Royal Swedish Naval Materiel Administration and achieved the rank of vice admiral in 1934 before retiring in 1938.

During World War II, Åkermark returned as Commanding Admiral of the West Coast Naval District (1939–1942). Known for his integrity, methodical leadership, and unwavering principles, he earned respect within the navy and beyond. His contributions to naval strategy and education, including involvement in various expert investigations, left a lasting legacy in Swedish maritime defence.

== Early life ==
Åkermark was born on 12 September 1873 in Gothenburg, Sweden, the son of Gudmund Åkermark, a magistrate's secretary, and his wife Amalia Tranchell. The reading of Marryat's and Trolle's sea novels aroused in Åkermark the desire to become a naval officer. As a native of Gothenburg, it was natural that he became interested in sea life at an early age. In addition, his grandfather Theodor Wilhelm Tranchell, founder of Lindholmen's workshop, shipowner and longtime chairman of the Seamen's Association in Gothenburg, was anxious to familiarize his grandchildren with the sea. As early as 1882, he gave Åkermark and his siblings a lifeboat with four oars. With it, they learned to row through the city's now filled canals and in summer rowed the boat to Hästevik on Hisingen. Gradually, the rowing trips were extended, and the boat stock was expanded with both rowing and sailboats. The voyages eventually included the entire Gothenburg archipelago and sailing trips to Marstrand and Uddevalla. With the cutters Siri and Smart, they participated in the sailing company Aeolus racing, when the well-sailed, semi-decked Smart won the first prize a few times. Åkermark made his first long voyage in the summer of 1885. To find out how he endured the sea, he had to accompany a relative, who was a sea captain, on a steamship to Newcastle. The result was favorable, and at the suggestion of a couple of well-known naval officers it was decided that for entry into the Royal Swedish Naval Academy, to which the age of entry was then 13–15 years, he would first undergo a preparatory institution privately arranged by the school teachers of the naval academy. In the spring of 1886, he therefore left the third grade in Göteborgs realläroverk and moved to Stockholm in the autumn. He had just turned 13 years old. He was accommodated with the headmaster of the preparatory school, Hampus Huldt, who turned out to have studied in Uppsala at the same time as Åkermark's father, the magistrate's secretary and notary public in Gothenburg, Gudmund Åkermark. Three other Gothenburg boys also went to school, among them Åkermark's relative William Gibson from Jonsered. They were then together for several years as cadets and naval officers.

This year's preparatory naval school had 32 students, and when the number, which in the autumn of 1887 was to be admitted as naval cadets, was only 12-15, the competition among the students was fierce. In the summer of 1887, Åkermark, as a cadet candidate, was allowed to accompany the corvette Norrköping. In mid-May, the corvette departed from Karlskrona and visited ports in Sweden, Norway, France and England. At the end of 24 July, the expedition returned to Karlskrona, and after graduating on board, the candidates left for their homes. The total land and sea grades this time were not enough for him to enter the naval academy. This was, well due to his young age, not expected either, and it was decided that he would go to the preparatory naval school for another year and live with senior lecturer Huldt. The grade was very good this time and in the spring of 1888 accompanied the registration for the entrance exam to the naval academy. On 1 October 1888, he, just turned 15, was admitted as a sea cadet as number 7 among 15 admitted to the Royal Swedish Naval Academy.

== Career ==
Åkermark was commissioned as a naval officer with the rank of underlöjtnant in the Swedish Navy in 1894 where he was promoted to sub-lieutenant in 1897. He underwent the Torpedo School's command course and the general course at the Royal Swedish Naval Academy from 1900 to 1902 and was a cadet officer and teacher at the Royal Swedish Naval Academy between 1902 and 1908, during which time he was promoted to lieutenant in 1903. Åkermark served as a teacher at the Royal Swedish Naval Staff College between 1914 and 1919, during which time he was promoted to lieutenant commander in 1916. Between 1901 and 1917, Åkermark served on various different naval ships. He commanded torpedo boat number 65 in 1901, the gunboat Skuld in 1906, the gunboats Skäggald in 1907 and 1908, the torpedo boats Antares and Iris in 1909, the destroyer Vidar in 1911, the destroyer Ragnar in 1912, the destroyer Munin in 1913 and the coastal defence ship HSwMS Drottning Victoria in 1921. Åkermark served as division commander in 1909 aboard the torpedo boat Iris, the torpedo boat Castor in 1910 and the destroyer Sigurd in 1916 and 1917. Åkermark commanded the Åland Expedition in 1918.

Åkermark was an expert in several investigations into issues concerning the navy between 1912 and 1926. He was a councilor in the navy's pension fund (flottans pensionskassa) in 1909, a member of the torpedo commission (torpedkommissionen) in Karlskrona and Stockholm in 1910, a member of the torpedo commission in 1917, an expert in the inquiry into the promotion system within the navy's officer and non-commissioned officer corps in 1912, an expert in the naval commission (marinkommissionen) in 1914, head of the Torpedo Department in Stockholm from 1917 to 1919, member and expert in the investigation regarding the officer corps' recruitment and training and more, assignment to lead the preparation of new torpedo firing instruction and torpedo exercise regulations in 1918, expert for the investigation regarding torpedo losses in 1919 and an expert in the naval preparation (marinberedninge) in 1920.

Åkermark was promoted to commander in 1919 and served as head of Torpedo Department in the Royal Swedish Naval Materiel Administration from 1919 to 1923 and as head of department in the Torpedo School from 1920 to 1922. He was promoted to captain in 1923 and then served as head of the Military Office of the Minister for Naval Affairs (Sjöförsvarets kommandoexpedition) from 1923 to 1927. Åkermark was at the disposal of the Riksdag's Committee on Defence as secretary for naval affairs in 1924. In the same year, he was an expert in the investigation regarding the promotion of non-commissioned officers to officers and more. He was then at the disposal of the Riksdag's Committee on Defence in 1925, and was an expert in submitting proposals for the organization of the naval reserve personnel between 1925 and 1926. Åkermark was promoted to rear admiral in 1927 and then served as Commander-in-Chief of the Coastal Fleet from 1927 to 1933. He then served as head of the Royal Swedish Naval Materiel Administration from 1933 to 1938. He was promoted to vice admiral in 1934 and retired in 1938, afterwich he served as chairman of the Maritime Safety Inquiry (Sjöfartsskyddsutredningen) in 1939. During World War II, Åkermark was called up and served as Commanding Admiral of the West Coast Naval District from 1939 to 1942.

Åkermark has been described as a "rare upstanding and straightforward man. He worked methodically to achieve his goals and he never deviated one bit from what he considered to be right, even though he thereby obtained dissenters. Behind his reserved and even withdrawn, almost shy exterior hid a will of steel, which, if necessary, could radiate an authority and power that did not require any external manifestations to assert itself."

== Personal life ==
In 1914, Åkermark married Märta Gjerling (1892–1983), the daughter of captain Edvard Gjerling and Baroness Augusta Funck. They had two children: Eva Augusta Amalia (1915–2012) and Bertil Gudmund Harald (1918–2010).

== Death ==
Åkermark died on 1 November 1963 and was interred on 24 July 1965 at Galärvarvskyrkogården in Stockholm.

== Dates of rank ==
- 1894 – Underlöjtnant
- 1897 – Sub-lieutenant
- 1903 – Lieutenant
- 1916 – Lieutenant commander
- 1919 – Commander
- 1923 – Captain
- 1927 – Rear admiral
- 1934 – Vice admiral

== Awards and decorations ==
=== Swedish ===
- (Sweden) Commander Grand Cross of the Order of the Sword (6 June 1934)
- (Sweden) Commander 1st Class of the Order of the Sword (16 June 1928)
- (Sweden) Commander of the Order of the Sword (15 September 1926)
- (Sweden) Knight 1st Class of the Order of the Sword (1915)
- (Sweden) Knight of the Order of the Polar Star (1918)
- (Sweden) Knight 1st Class of the Order of Vasa (1908)
- (Sweden) Swedish Auxiliary Naval Corps' Gold Medal
- (Sweden) Royal Swedish Society of Naval Sciences' Silver Medal (1913)

=== Foreign ===
- (Latvia) Grand Cross of the Order of the Three Stars (between 1928 and 1930)
- (Chile) Grand Officer of the Order of Merit (1930)
- (Denmark) Commander 2nd Class of the Order of the Dannebrog (between 1921 and 1925)
- (France) Commander of the Legion of Honour (1930)
- (France) Knight of the Legion of Honour (between 1910 and 1915)
- Commander 2nd Class of the Order of the White Rose of Finland (between 1925 and 1928)
- Commander of the Order of the Crown of Italy (between 1925 and 1928)
- (Netherlands) Commander of the Order of Orange-Nassau with Swords (between 1925 and 1928)
- (Norway) Commander of the Order of St. Olav (between 1921 and 1925)
- (Russian Empire) Knight 3rd Class of the Order of Saint Anna (1909)

== Honours ==
- Member of the Royal Swedish Academy of War Sciences (1921)
- Member of the Royal Swedish Society of Naval Sciences (1908)
- Honorary member of the Royal Swedish Society of Naval Sciences (1927)
- Member of the Swedish Association of Graduate Engineers (Svenska Teknologföreningen) (1934)

Military offices
Preceded by Fredrik Riben	Military Office of the Minister for Naval Affairs; 1923–1927	Succeeded by Einar Selander
Preceded by Otto Lybeck	Commander-in-Chief of the Coastal Fleet; 1927–1933	Succeeded by Fabian Tamm
Preceded by John Schneidler	Royal Swedish Naval Materiel Administration; 1933–1938	Succeeded by Gunnar Bjurner
Preceded by Gösta Lindström	West Coast Naval District; 1939–1942	Succeeded by Elis Biörklund
