= Royal Swedish Naval Academy =

School for officer training for the Swedish Navy

Coordinates: 59°19′27″N 18°5′3″E

- Kungliga Sjökrigsskolan
- Active: 1756–1987
- Country: Sweden
- Allegiance: Swedish Armed Forces
- Branch: Swedish Navy
- Type: Naval academy
- Garrison/HQ: Karlskrona (1756–1792); Karlberg (1792–1868); Stockholm (1868–1943); Täby (1943–1987)
- March: "Reginamarsch" (Urbach) (Note: The march was adopted on 10 February 1976.)

The Royal Swedish Naval Academy (Swedish: Kungliga Sjökrigsskolan, KSS) was a school for officer training for the Swedish Navy, which operated in various forms between the years 1756 and 1987.

== History ==
=== 1683–1791 ===
In 1683, when the charter was issued that "those who were proposed to become officers in the navy, should undergo a naval officer exam", the navy only possessed the training schools, Mate's and Artillery Schools (Styrmans- och artilleriskolorna) in Karlskrona which was established by Admiral H. Wachtmeister. Later at Sveaborg a naval school for officers and cadets of the Fleet of the Army was established. But it wasn't until 1756, after the cadet corps (paid for by Adolf Frederick in 1748) ceased, that a real sea cadet school, called Cadette Corpsen vid Ammiralitetet i Carlskrona, was established at the Admiralty in Karlskrona with the purpose "to bring viable subjects to the navy". However, it was found, that "not all of the accepted cadets possessed mind and qualities to become naval officers," why the school in 1761 was converted into a reformatory, common for the maritime and land state.

=== 1791–1865 ===
The school ceased in 1791 after a conflagration and the lustschloss Karlberg in Stockholm opened the following year as a Royal War Academy with the task "to prepare skilled subjects to the national land army and navy." For many years, aspirants could, without completing the syllabus at the academy, graduate with approved naval officer exam at the Royal War Academy (1836–49) as well as face a special assessment commission in Karlskrona (1824–64). At the latter location there was a joint advanced course at the mate, skipper and artillery schools, named the Educational Institution for Officers of the Royal Navy in Karlskrona. When the Royal War Academy in 1862 finally was converted into a military application school "for all the army and the navy needed officers," it led the organization to such disorders, particularly with regard to the entry age, education and training, that the school was considered inappropriate for sea cadet's teaching of serviceable professionals.

=== 1865–1916 ===
Since a committee in 1865 issued "proposal for the organization of a naval officer education", the first charter of the Royal Swedish Naval Academy was issued, which began operations in 1867 and the following year received the sea cadets from Karlberg. Until 1911 the school had six classes, each with a one-year course partly from 1 October to about 1 May at the school in Stockholm and partly on board during the summer months, preferably, on seagoing, sailing warship (the corvettes af Chapman, Norrköping, Saga and Freja as well as the frigate Vanadis). Teaching at the school on land involved partly ordinary school subjects mainly the courses which were included in the curriculum of the general secondary schools, to the extent of not less than the requirements for the studentexamen, and partly military subjects, as well at the school on board almost exclusively practical exercises.

Admission was generally permitted only in the school's 1st grade at 14–16 years of age and after the time trial, in which over a period of years also included a so-called aspirant course aboard. Because of the 1909 parliamentary decision the education was rescheduled from 1911. Admission into the school now required passing the studentexamen, and teaching of sea cadets at school, on land and aboard on contemporary warships, comprised almost exclusively of military subjects during a little longer than a three-year course. According to the school issued regulations (8 October 1915), its purpose, in theoretical, practical and disciplinary terms of the naval officer programme, was to execute the training required to gain the lowest officer rank in the navy, and that, in a coastal artillery programme execute a part of the training, which was required to gain the lowest officer rank in the coastal artillery. The school's disciples were called cadets ("sea cadets" and "coastal artillery cadets") and together constitute the Navy Cadet Corps (Marinens kadettkår). The school's operations were divided between school on land for both programmes of two academic years for the naval officer programme and one academic year for the coastal artillery programme as well as a recruit course and school aboard only for the naval officer programme. The academic year at the school on land comprised the period around 21 October-1 May with three weeks of Christmas holidays, recruit course 15 July-1 October (Karlskrona) and the school aboard on the "cadet ship" one winter and three summers.

In the naval officers program on land, the teaching included a large number of educational and training subjects: navigation plus trigonometry, weapons teaching, naval warfare, shipbuilding, machinery, torpedo and naval mine teaching, fortification, organizational teaching, laws of war and maritime law, commissariat teaching, physics, mathematics and mechanics as well as English and French, as well as machine work, gymnastic and weapons carrying, firearms drill, sport and shooting practice; in the coastal artillery programme: arms, coastal fortification, mine and torpedo teaching, fortification and topography, organizational teaching, regulations for the navy and the laws of war, navigation, mechanical engineering, shipbuilding, naval warfare, ground warfare and commissariat teaching, as well as gymnastics and weapon carrying, firearms drill and sport; the school aboard included the subject of navigation, seamanship, likewise extensive theoretical ships control, regulations, laws of war, weapons teaching and boat knowledge and practice subjects as practical navigation, astronomical observations, artillery drill, shooting exercises with artillery, torpedo teaching, naval mine teaching, electrical engineering, signaling, security training, equipment management, officer duties, practical ship control, instruction exercises, craft handling, firearms drill, shooting practice with handguns, hydrographic surveys, field fortifications, health and first aid teaching, gymnastics and weapons training along with sport, and at the side of this practical service on board.

Admission for sea cadet required, for instance, the passing of studentexamen and a minimum age of 17, maximum age of 20 (during the calendar year). Admission for coastal artillery cadet required, for instance, passing of the studentexamen or moving to the IVth grade at the upper secondary school and a minimum age of 16, maximum age of 21 (during the calendar year). The teaching took place at the coastal artillery except for a short time aboard the navy vessels and one academic year at the Naval Academy, all in all about two and a half years (Royal proclamation 11 December 1914). In 1916, the Naval Academy included 69 cadets. Teaching was carried by 20 teachers. The staff consisted of one head, one adjutant and librarian, a maximum of eight regular cadet officers, extra cadet officers, one intendant and one doctor. The highest supervision of the school was exercised by the head of the Ministry for Naval Affairs. From 1879 the Naval Academy owned one specifically constructed building on Skeppsholmen.

=== 1916–1987 ===
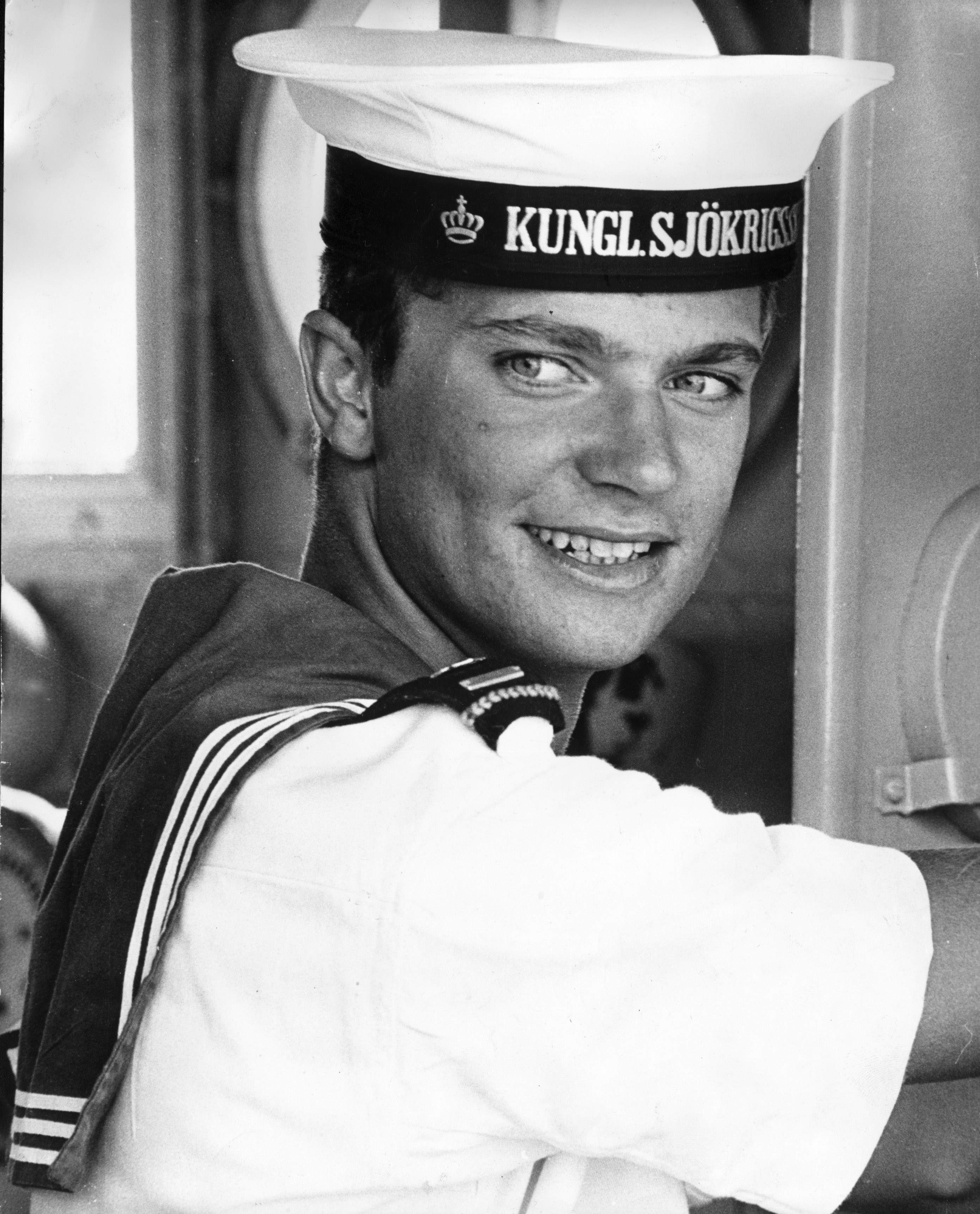
King Carl XVI Gustaf as a cadet, circa 1966.

The King in Councils regulations for the Naval Academy on 12 January 1939, put the school under the Chief of the Navy and in a management purpose under the Royal Swedish Naval Materiel Administration. The training was organized with an aspirant school on land, a cadet school on land, as well as practical courses aboard and on land, and included the aspirant and cadet training in the following programmes: naval officer programme, coastal artillery programme, naval engineer programme, naval quartermaster programme, a reserve officer programme (navy, coastal artillery) and reserve quartermaster programme. The aspirant training was conducted at the aspirant school on land and in practical courses aboard, which usually took place aboard ships on an expedition to foreign waters. The cadet training took place at the cadet school on land and in practical courses aboard (sea corses) and on land (land courses). The cadet school was divided into courses, comprising one academic year. The academic year began in October and ended in April or May.

By the regulations on 26 March 1943, the head of the Naval Academy was put directly under the Chief of the Navy and in an economically purpose under the Royal Swedish Naval Materiel Administration. The staff of the Naval Academy consisted of the head, regimental officer from the navy and vice chief, regimental officer from the coastal artillery, and both company officers, holders of retired staff intended positions and civilian executives at the Naval Academy in accordance with established staff lists for the navy, and military and civilian military staff commanded to the school, partly also special interim civilian teaching staff. Regulations also stipulated that besides aspirant and cadet training also some training should be communicated to conscript sea captains, students and assimilated, which was carried out in commons educational programmes in the fleet, coastal artillery and navy.

Rising number of courses and the greatly increased number of students in each course, a huge increase in mainly military subjects, the categorical requirement of student accommodation in an environment where the short training time could be utilized effectively, lack of own spaces for boat service, gymnastics, athletics and weapons exercises and the need for adequate facilities for teaching operation, were some of the reasons why the old Naval Academy at Skeppsholmen was no longer sufficient. Näsby matched almost the requests. With a location in the vicinity of Stockholm, whereby teachers could expect specially trained officers, the property offered sufficient land areas as well as opportunities for the organization of a marina in the Näsby Bay in direct connection with the lake, so that the cadet ships could anchor off the bay. In a year's time, in 1942, all the required conversion and new construction projects were completed, and on 11 January 1943 the Naval Academy took Näsby in possession. It was then located here until 1987. During this period, a number of buildings within the castle grounds were added.

== Building ==
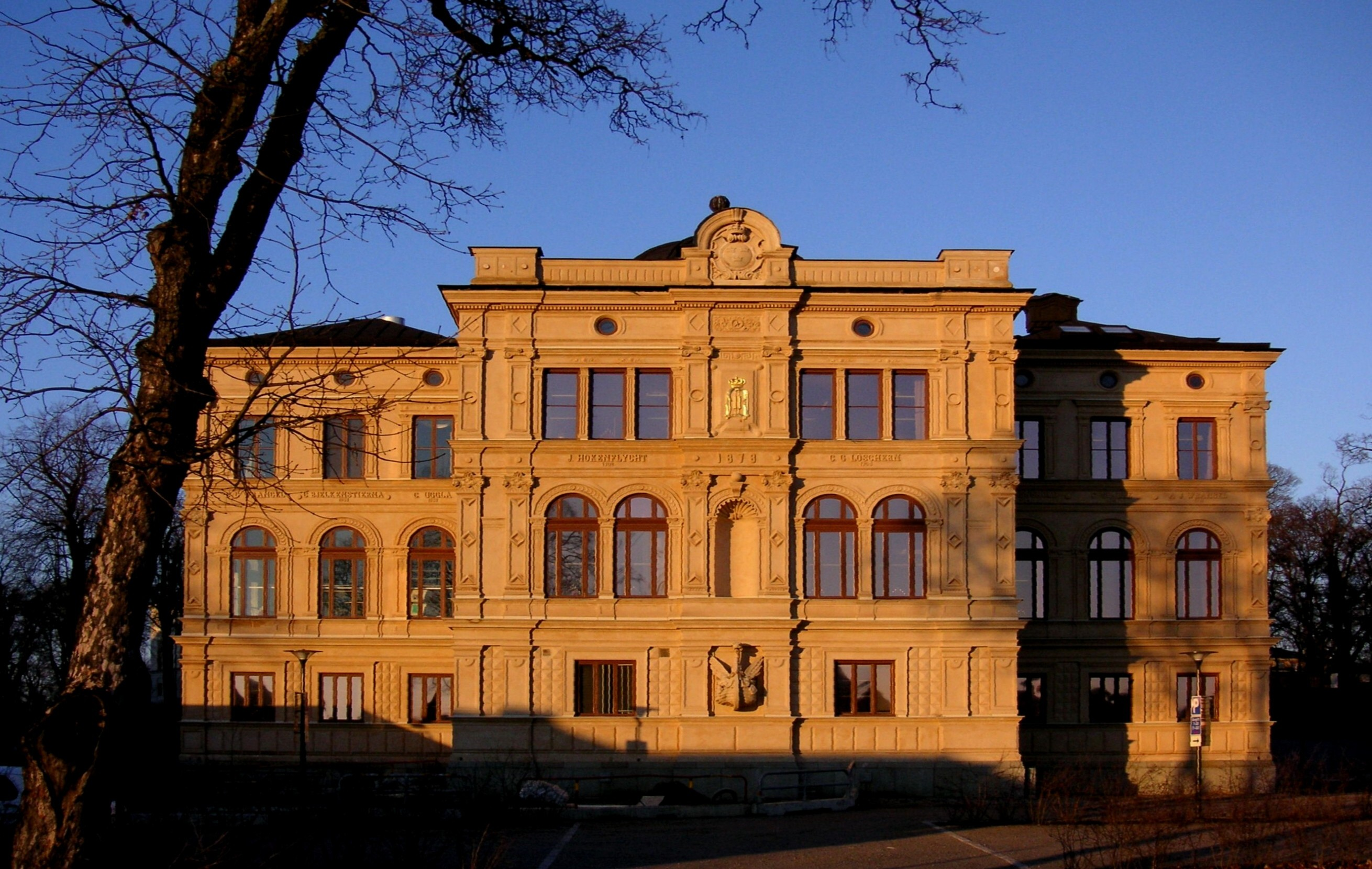
Royal Swedish Naval Academy.

Designed in 1876 as a compact Renaissance palace by Vice City Architect Axel Fredrik Nyström (1832–1894) and inaugurated in 1879, the sumptuous façades of the three stories, to many, were regarded as indecorous on the military setting on the island. The reform of the military academy in 1862 had, however, forced the education of naval officers to be relocated to the eastern part of the city, and Nyström's plans were therefore accepted. The skylight turret was intended to be used as an observatory in the education. The building served as a school until 1943, today being the location for the organisation Nordregio, instigated by the Nordic Council of Ministers in 1997, and advocating issues of interest for northern Europe and the Baltic region.

== Heraldry and traditions ==
=== Coat of arms ===
The coat of arms of the Royal Swedish Naval Academy 1867–1987. It was later used by the Swedish Navy Staff College (Marinens krigshögskola, MKHS) from 1987 to 1998 and the Swedish Naval Warfare Centre since 2005. Blazon: "Azure, an anchor erect cabled surmounting two gunbarrels of older pattern, or. The shield surmounted an open chaplet or."

=== March ===
In 1944, the "Sjökrigsskolemarsch" (Åkerman) was adopted as unit march. On 10 February 1976 it was replaced by "Reginamarsch" (Urbach), which the school used together with the 11th Helicopter Squadron (11. helikopterdivisionen) and the East Coast Naval Base.

== Heads ==
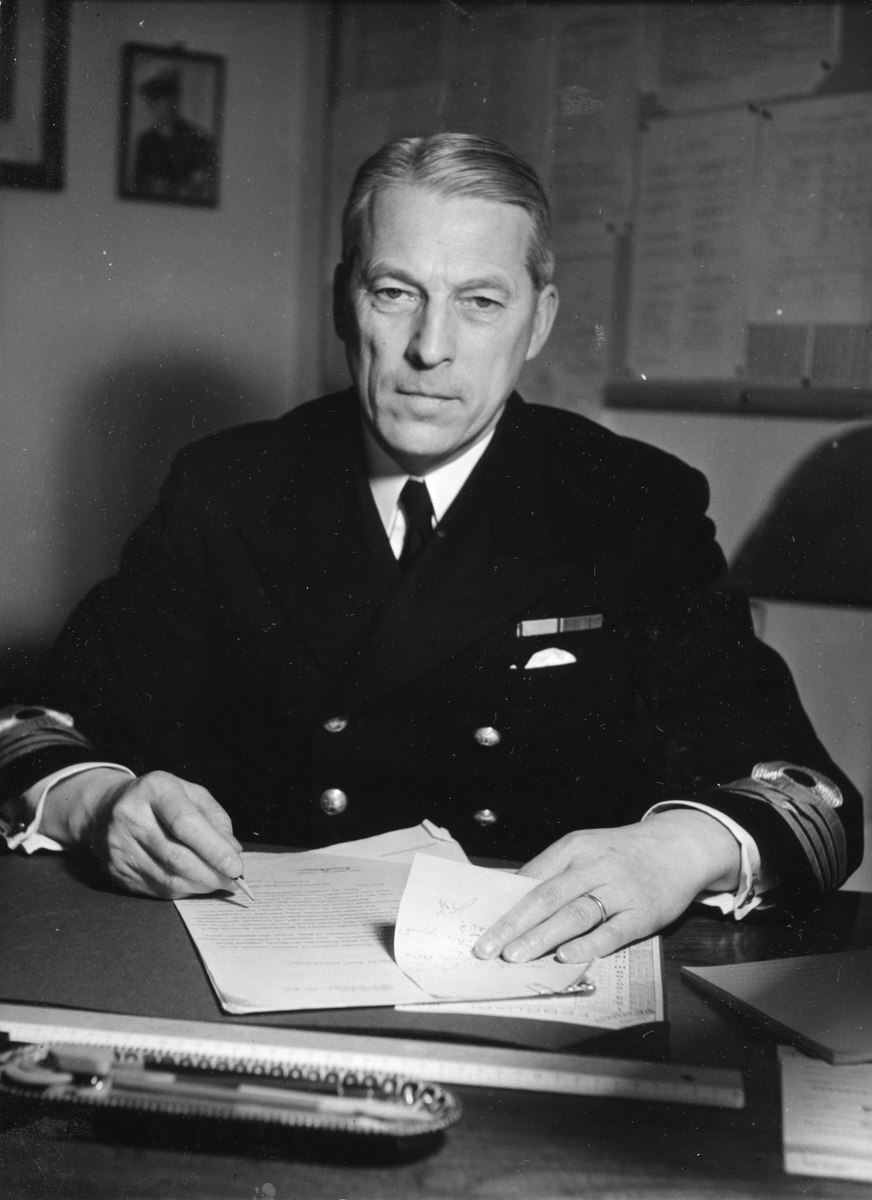
Captain Jens Stefenson, seen here as head of the Royal Swedish Naval Academy.

- 1867–1870: Olof Georg August Herkepè
- 1870–1877: Johan Henrik Ankarcrona
- 1877–1884: Mauritz Per von Krusenstierna
- 1884–1890: Johan Adolf Christian Meister
- 1890–1895: Jacob Hägg
- 1895–1900: Nils Gustaf Sundström
- 1900–1905: Gustaf Dyrssen
- 1905–1908: Henry Lindberg
- 1909–1914: Carl Alarik Wachtmeister
- 1914–1918: Carl Sparre
- 1914–1915: Olof Gyldén (acting)
- 1918–1921: Fredrik Riben
- 1921–1925: Fabian Tamm
- 1926–1931: Halvar Söderbaum
- 1931–1933: Helge Friis
- 1933–1936: Magnus von Arbin
- 1936–1937: Helge Bager
- 1937–1937: Sten Weinberg (acting)
- 1937–1943: Erik Samuelson
- 1943–1949: Jens Stefenson
- 1949–1953: Gustaf Sebastian Tamm
- 1953–1958: Sven Samuel Gustaf David Hermelin
- 1958–1964: Hans Gustaf Otto C:son Uggla
- 1964–1969: Willy Edenberg
- 1969–1971: Rolf Rheborg
- 1971–1977: Rolf Skedelius
- 1977–1980: Bengt O'Konor
- 1980–1982: Hans Tynnerström
- 1982–1983: Carl-Gustaf Hammarskjöld
- 1983–1984: Gustaf Taube
- 1986–1987: Gustav Samuelsson

== Names, designations and locations ==
Name	Translation	From		To
Arméns flotta	Army Fleet	1756-11-05	–	1867-??-??
Kungliga Sjökrigsskolan	Royal Swedish Naval Academy	1867-??-??	–	1974-12-31
Sjökrigsskolan	Swedish Naval Academy	1975-01-01	–	1987-06-30
Designation		From		To
KSS		1867-??-??	–	1987-06-30
Location		From		To
Karlskrona		1756-11-05	–	1867-??-??
Karlberg Palace		1867-??-??	–	1879-??-??
Östermalm/Wallingatan		1879-??-??	–	1879-??-??
Skeppsholmen		1879-??-??	–	1943-01-10
Näsby Castle		1943-01-11	–	1987-06-30

== See also ==
- Royal Swedish Naval Staff College
