= HSwMS Saga =

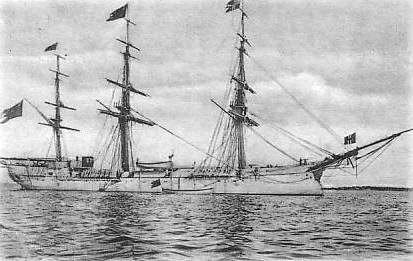
- Saga at Karlskrona, c. 1900.

History

Sweden
- Name: Saga
- Builder: Karlskrona Yard
- Laid down: 7 August 1874
- Launched: 12 November 1877
- In service: 20 June 1878
- Out of service: 25 June 1926

General characteristics
- Displacement: 1617 tons
- Length: 61 m (200.13 ft)
- Beam: 10.2 m (33.46 ft)
- Draft: 5.6 m (18.37 ft)
- Speed: 11 knots (20.37 km/h)
- Complement: 188 men
- Armament: As built: 1 × 167 mm gun; 6 × 122 mm guns; After 1888 rebuild: 1 × 152 mm gun; 8 × 122 mm guns; 1 × 65 mm landing gun

HSwMS Saga was a steam corvette of the Royal Swedish Navy.

Saga was used for training sailors. During the winter season she served as a depot ship for the recruit unit. Saga was used as a cadet vessel from 1878 to 1887, and from 1894 to 1909, later being used as a barracks ship. She was decommissioned in 1926. Her propeller is displayed outside the Naval Museum in Karlskrona.

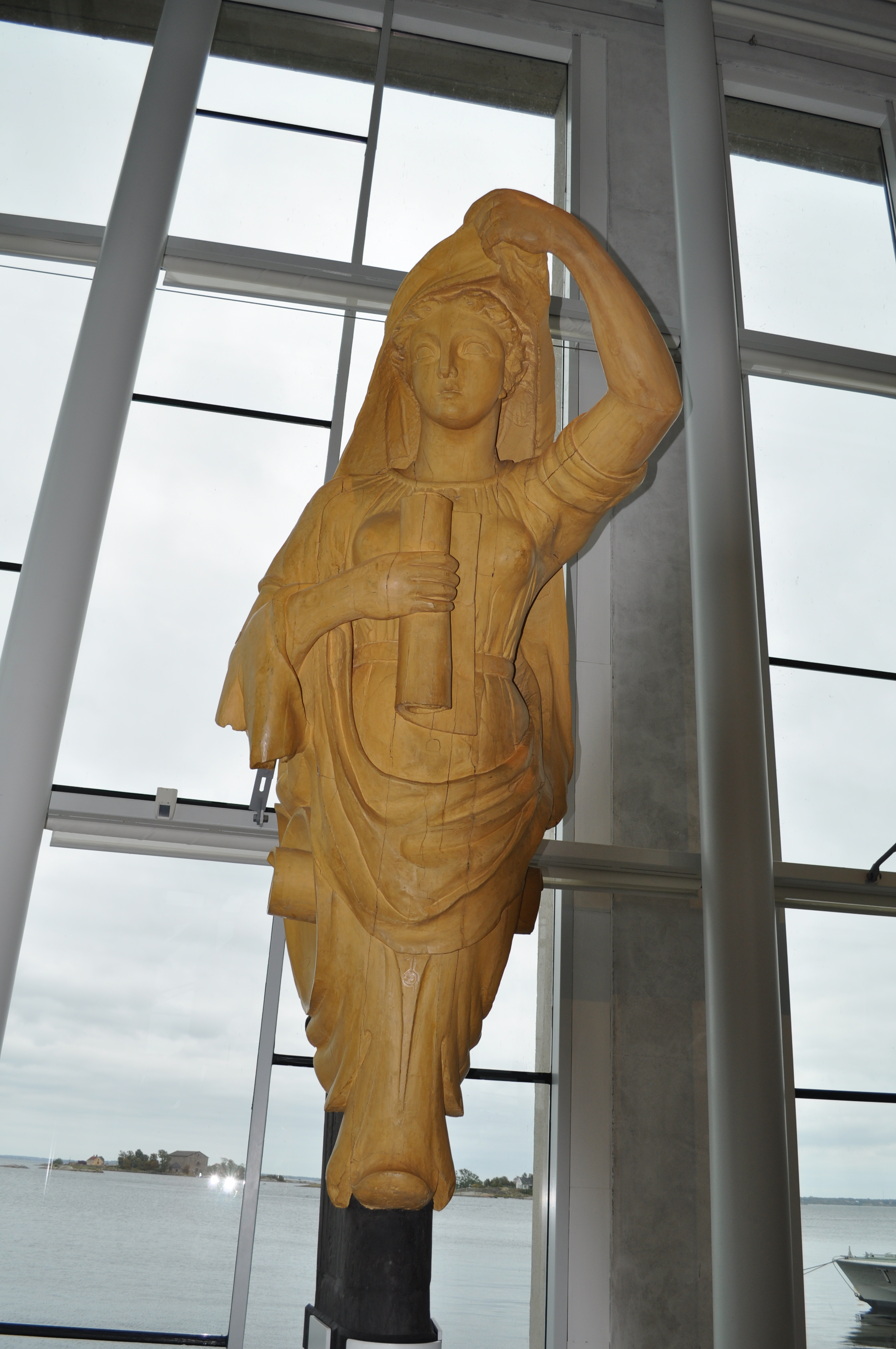
Saga's figurehead, created by Carl August Sundwall

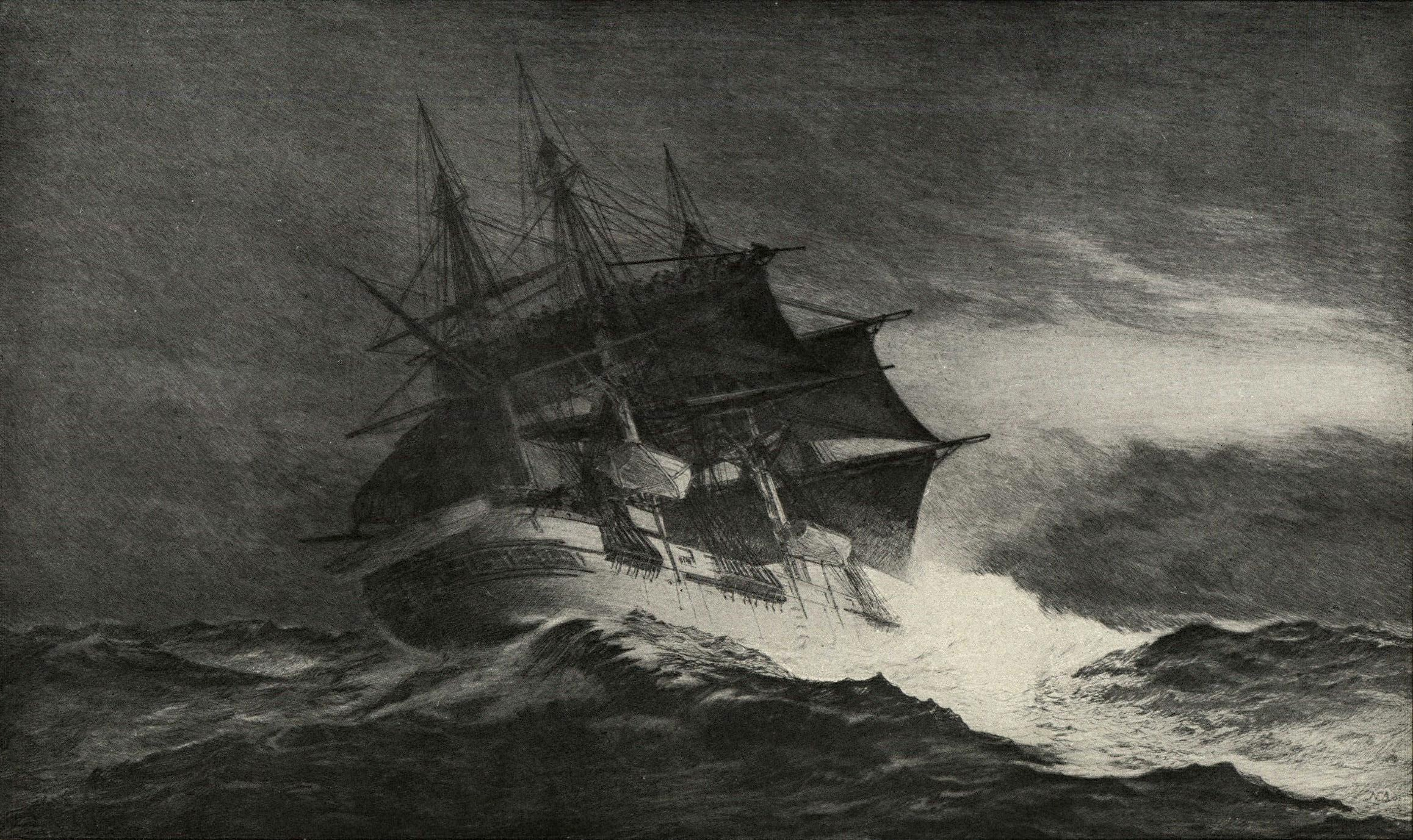
Etching by Nils Elias Anckers

== Service history ==
In June 1902, Saga visited Sheerness.
