= Enbom =

Enbom is a Swedish surname. Notable people with the surname include:

- Fritiof Enbom (1918–1974), Swedish spy
- Ross Enbom (1948–2008), Australian rules footballer
- Wilhelmina Enbom (1804–1880), Swedish operatic soprano
