= Tingsten =

Tingsten is a Swedish surname. Notable people with the surname include:

- Lars Tingsten (1857–1937), Swedish Army general and Minister for War
- Herbert Tingsten (1896–1973), Swedish political scientist, writer, and newspaper publisher
