= Boden Fortress =

Fortress in Norrbotten County, Sweden

- Bodens fästning
- Boden, Norrbotten in Sweden
- Rödberget Fort, part of Boden Fortress, seen from the north. The caponier ditch and the armoured turrets are clearly visible.

Site information
- Type: Fortress
- Owner: Government of Sweden
- Controlled by: Sweden
- Open to the public: Yes, some parts

Location
- Boden shown within Scandinavia
- Location within Scandinavia
- Coordinates: 65.83°N 21.69°E

Site history
- Built: Complete fortress: 1900–1916; Main forts: 1901–1908
- Built by: Government of Sweden
- In use: 1908–1998
- Materials: Concrete, stone, steel
- Battles/wars: None

Garrison information
- Garrison: Complete fortress: 15,000 men (Note: Other sources mention other numbers; Hagerfors 2002 says that the five forts could accommodate up to 25,000 men, Nyström & Skeppstedt 1990, p. 220 says that calculations in 1926 put the wartime force in and around Boden at 16,521 men and Ericson Wolke 2009, p. 175 says no more than 12,000–13,000 men were stationed in the fortress during the Second World War.); Main forts: 2,000 men

Boden Fortress (Swedish: Bodens fästning) is a modern fortress consisting of several major and minor forts and fortifications surrounding the city of Boden, Norrbotten, in northern Sweden. The fortress was originally intended to stop or delay attacks from the east or coastal assaults, which at the time of construction meant Russian attacks launched from Finland. It was primarily the expansion of the railway network in Norrland, which in turn was a consequence of the rising importance of the northern iron ore fields, that led to the increased strategic value of northern Sweden and the construction of the fortress. Although the main forts were finished in 1908, many of the supporting fortifications were not completed until the start of the First World War. Improvements were also continuously made during, and between, both World Wars.

Boden Fortress is made up of five primary self-supporting forts excavated out of the bedrock in five of the mountains surrounding Boden: Degerberget, Mjösjöberget, Gammelängsberget, Södra Åberget and Rödberget. Eight fortified secondary artillery positions were constructed between the forts to give flanking support and to cover areas not in range of the main forts' artillery. In addition, 40 bunkers for infantry, along with dugouts and other fortifications, were built to cover even more terrain. During the Second World War anti-tank gun emplacements and additional bunkers and shelters were built, and tens of kilometres of dragon's teeth were placed around the fortress and the city itself. Owing to the end of the Cold War and the reduction of the threat from the Soviet Union, Boden Fortress became less important to the defence of Sweden, and began to be decommissioned. The last fort of the complex was decommissioned on 31 December 1998, and is now used as a tourist attraction. All five forts as well as some of the supporting structures have been declared historic buildings, to be preserved for the future, by the Swedish government.

== Background ==
=== Central and peripheral defence ===
A map of the theoretical Swedish central defence systems discussed and planned in the later part of the 19th century, the three proposed central fortresses marked with stars, and probable Russian directions of attack marked with arrows. Larger cities and towns mentioned in the text are also included.

The two dominating theories of how to use fortifications in the operational perspective during the 18th and 19th centuries were the central fortress system (centrala fästningssystemet) and the peripheral fortress system (perifera fästningssystemet), the latter also called the cordon system. The two systems were also known as central defence and peripheral defence. The peripheral defence theory was based on building smaller fortifications in advance positions to meet the enemy at an early stage, while the central defence theory was meant to weaken the enemy step by step in minor skirmishes and ambushes carried out by forces supplied and supported by central fortresses not located in the front line. In short, one theory advocated many minor fortifications built to directly engage the enemy, while the other advocated only a few major fortifications built not to directly engage the enemy, but to support the troops that engaged the enemy. (Note: The meaning of these two terms have shifted over the years. In the military terminology of the 19th century, the theories were mainly applied at the operational level, which means that both systems could be used for the defence of a country at the same time but at different theatres of war. From the late 19th century and onwards, the terms were used in a wider context, being applied mainly at the grand strategic level, thus making the two systems mutually exclusive rather than complementary for the defence of a country. This has spurred confusion as a fortification built for central defence—by the early usage of the term—in the outer portions of a country can be seen as a fortification built for peripheral defence—by the late usage of the term. See Nyström & Skeppstedt 1990, pp. 29–40 and pp. 75–78 for a discussion on this and examples of the early usage, see Nelsson 1993, p. 89 and Bergmark 1980, p.517 for two examples of the terms in late usage applied to Boden Fortress. This article uses the terms in their original, operational, meaning.)

In the beginning of the 19th century the peripheral system—at least in Sweden—was deemed unmodern, due to the extremely long border and coastline of the country, which required a lot of personnel to maintain and support, leading to high costs and a neglect of the more mobile armed forces. The peripheral system was also meant to contain the enemy to a specific area, the coast and borders, but as time went and new tactics were taken into practice, the thin line of fortifications would be easily penetrated by the enemy forces, and when the enemy had advanced through the peripheral line, there would not be enough troops in the hinterland to stop the attacker. The central fortress system was better adjusted to defence in depth, it was not until the enemy attack had reached its culminating point that full counter-attacks would be launched. The central defence had also proven effective in the Seven Years' War—used by Frederick II of Prussia—and in Napoleon's Invasion of Russia—used by the Russians. Carl von Clausewitz, in his military treatise On War, even mentioned Sweden's good conditions for this kind of war of attrition:

The fourth principle, the Assistance of the Theatre of War, is naturally an advantage on the side of the defensive. [...] the army on the defensive continues to keep up its connection with everything, that is, it enjoys the support of its fortresses, is not weakened in any way, and is near to its sources of supply. [...] The campaign of 1812, gives as it were in a magnifying glass a very clear illustration of the effect of the means specified under principles 3 and 4. [...] It is true that with the exception of Sweden there is no country in Europe which is situated like Russia, but the efficient principle is always the same, the only distinction being in the greater or less degree of its strength.

=== Fortification of Sweden ===
Sweden had just lost one third of its population, as Russia had conquered the eastern part and created the Grand Duchy of Finland out of it during the Finnish War in 1808–1809. Shortly after, in 1814, the west flank had been secured by the personal union with Norway, and after the Napoleonic Wars, the former main enemy of Sweden in the south, Denmark, was no longer any threat. The only threat left was Russia, which now stood just across the border in the north, and had possession of the Åland Islands less than 150 km from the Swedish capital Stockholm. The Swedish Navy was considered superior to the Russian in the Gulf of Bothnia, so a seaborne invasion against the coast of Norrland was not likely. And even though the Russians had invaded northern Sweden via Finland in the previous war, the general opinion was that in case of a new war, their main attack would be conducted towards Stockholm and southern Sweden.

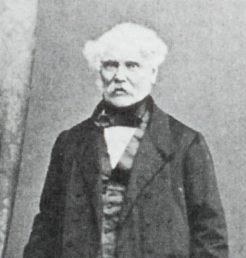
Johan Peter Lefrén, general, military theorist and secretary of the Swedish Fortification Committee of 1819.

This opinion led to the thought of finding a good rear defence area where the Estates and the Swedish government could move if the capital was in danger. This in turn naturally strengthened the central defence theory. The core land (kärnlandet) would be the place from where the main part of the field army would conduct its operations, supported by a few fortresses. The area between the two large lakes of Vänern and Vättern was the choice for this core land, with approximately the same border as Skaraborg County. Sweden above the province of Dalarna was not even considered to be included in this strategy. The realisation of the middle Sweden central defence system was finally made 5 February 1819 when King Charles XIV John decided that one main fortress, the central fortress, and two smaller "operational fortresses" were to be built. The central fortress became Karlsborg Fortress at Karlsborg, while the two operational fortresses meant to be located at either end of Vättern never were built due to lack of funds.

While Norrland was not supposed to be included in this main central defence strategy, studies on how to defend this major part of the country were still conducted. However, northern Sweden was generally considered of very limited military interest and unsuitable for larger military operations due to the bad state of most of the roads, the large uninhabited areas, the large rivers and the very limited economical gain that the lands provided. The first of these studies, laid down by the Fortification Committee of 1819 (1819 års befästningskommitté)—which was largely influenced by the committee's secretary Johan Peter Lefrén—led to nothing more than the opinion that the large rivers up north—especially the Ångerman River—would benefit the defence and that no major fortifications were to be built. In another study from 1824, colonel—and much later Swedish Minister for War—Gustaf Oscar Peyron suggested that it would be better to fortify positions just south of Boden—along the more northern Lule River—for example at Sävast or Avan. However no major changes were made, partially due to the limited military interest, but also because of the large amounts of money that was spent on building Karlsborg Fortress and modernizing other older fortifications in southern Sweden.

=== Railroads speed up planning ===
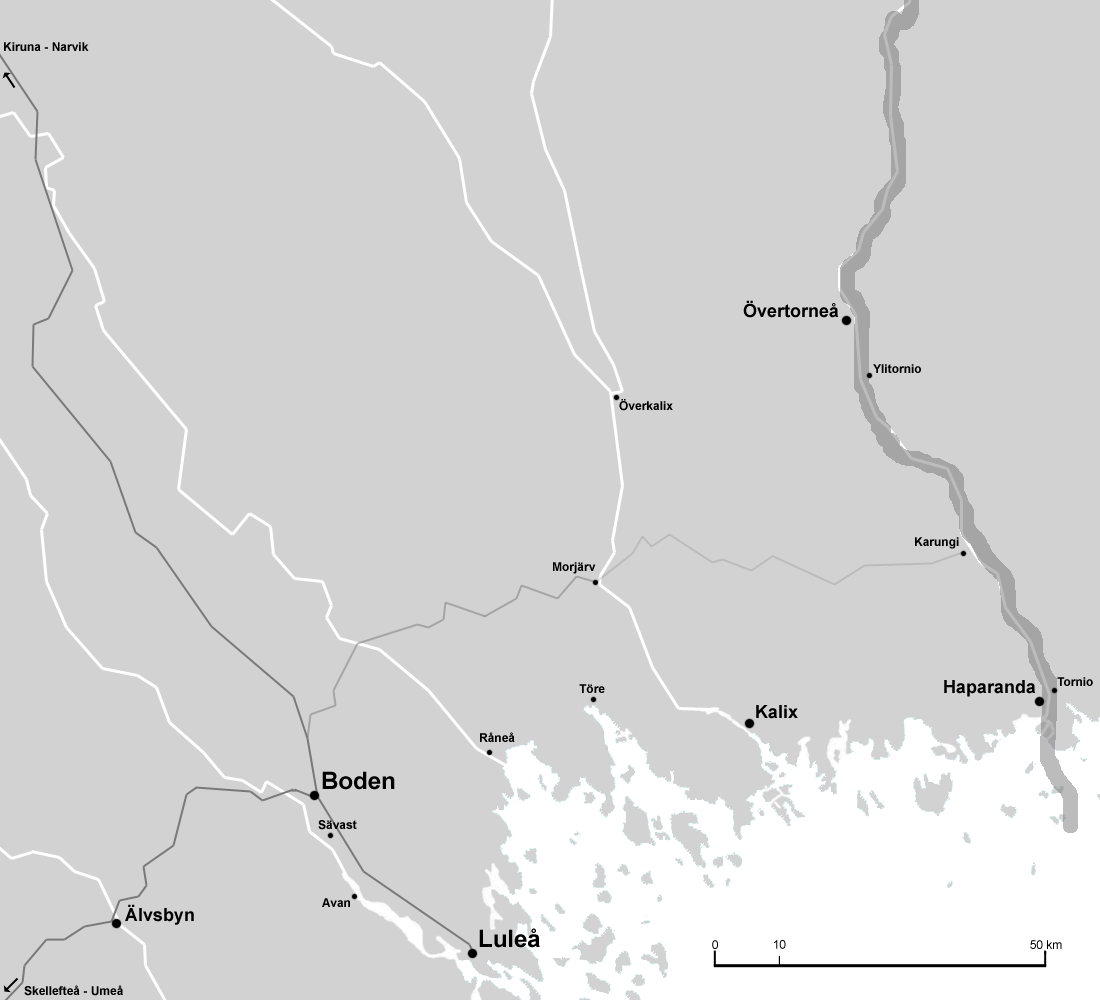
The location of Boden, and thus Boden Fortress, in an operational perspective, with completed railroad lines by 1895, 1902 and 1914 in different shades of grey. (Larger version)

It was not until fifteen years later, when yet another committee—the Coastal Fortification Committee of 1839 (1839 års kustbefästningskommitté)—studied the defence of Norrland, that the Swedish Armed Forces started to focus a bit more on the northern provinces. This study however mainly presented plans for middle Norrland, and the provinces of Medelpad, Ångermanland and Jämtland. Those provinces had a more significant role as it was there that the main roads of Sweden started to intersect with the road network of Norway, which at the time was allied with Sweden. The road network north of this area consisted of the large coastal road—the only major north–south road—from Haparanda and all the way through Norrland down to Gävle. All the other major roads exclusively ran southeast–northwest—following the run of the large rivers—before ending in wilderness and thus did not provide any route further west into Norway and on to the Atlantic coast. The plans to strengthen Norrland by building a central fortress either on Frösön outside Östersund, or closer to the coast at Borgsjö outside Ånge, once again fell flat due to lack of money and lower priority compared to fortifications in southern Sweden.

By the 1860s, the first Swedish railway main lines (stambanor) were completed in the southern part of the country, and by 1881 the Northern Main Line had reached Ånge. This, and the opening of the railway line connecting Sundsvall–Östersund–Trondheim (the Central and Meråker Lines) a year later strengthened the plans for a defensive line in the middlemost provinces of Norrland. At the same time, on the other side of the Bothnian Gulf, the Finnish main railway to Oulu had almost been completed, and would soon be of great use for the Russians to transport military personnel and supplies towards the Swedish border in case of war. (Note: In reality, the Russians were as worried about the extension of the Finnish main railway line as the Swedes. When the Finns wanted to extend the railway even further, up to Tornio right at the Swedish border, the Ministry of War of the Russian Empire protested as this did not suit the defensive plans for Finland where most troops were stationed in the southern parts of the Grand Duchy. They also believed that the sympathies of the Finnish people were with Sweden and that a railway from the Swedish border down into the heart of Finland would suit a Swedish offensive—perhaps with German help—all too well. When Nicholas II of Russia approved the extension in 1895, he went against the very strong opinion of the military. Nyström & Skeppstedt 1990, pp. 47–50.) Combined with the planned Luleå–Boden–Gällivare–Kiruna–Narvik railway stretch (the Iron Ore and Ofoten Lines), this would pose a great opportunity for the Russians to fulfill their latent wish to seize control of northern Scandinavia and the Atlantic ports on the Norwegian coast. At least according to some officers—both Swedish and Norwegian—which in the second half of the 1880s noticed the increased strategic importance of northern Scandinavia and Lapland as an effect of the construction of the railway lines in the area. This was also noticed by the Riksdag member Johan Erik Nyström from Norrbotten's electoral district who—worried about the railway to Oulu—put forward a motion about strengthening the Upper Norrland defence in 1885. The length of the railway lines started to affect strategic planning, and in some cases military decisions influenced the planning of new railway lines.

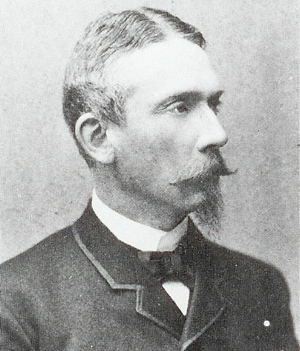
Axel Rappe, chief of the Swedish General Staff 1882–1892 and 1899–1905, Swedish Minister for War 1892–1899, and the spiritual father of Boden Fortress.

Even though the northernmost stretch of the Main Line Through Upper Norrland had long been planned, it was not until 1887 and the victory of the Lantmanna Party's protectionist wing in that year's election that the financial means—from increased trade tariff income—and the political will allowed the completion of the railway through Överluleå, which Boden was sometimes called. The "slumbering resources and the rapid expansion" in Upper Norrland were two reasons to build a railway to the sparsely populated area; another factor that had a big part in the decision to complete the main line was the government's takeover of the Luleå–Gällivare line, which had previously been in the hands of an English company. The stretch was very lucrative, as it considerably eased the transport of iron ore from the ore fields around Kiruna and Gällivare down to the coast for further transport by boat. Another English company had in the 1860s tried to construct a combination of a railway and a canal—the English Canal—for the stretch, but went bankrupt before their plans were completed. The company contracted for the new railway line experienced similar economic difficulties and the Swedish state decided to buy the nearly completed line to finish it in 1891.

The decision to complete the railway through to Boden sparked interest in Norrbotten among the members of the Swedish General Staff, and the chief, Axel Rappe, conducted a survey trip to the region in 1887. His report mentioned the changed strategic options due to the railway lines on both sides of the Gulf and a need for some kind of fortification in Boden, but he also toned down the earlier thoughts on the Russian interest in the Luleå–Narvik line. Rappe's report directly affected the future stretch of the railway line in Norrbotten. His recommendations, largely based on his and the General Staff's military planning, not to build the line along the coast, or build it all the way to the Swedish-Finnish border at Haparanda were later followed. The subsequent report completed in 1890 by the Neutrality Committee of 1888 (1888 års neutralitetskommitté)—with Axel Rappe as one of its members—suggested that a credible neutrality required an increased defence of the north-eastern border and proposed a budget of 1.3 million Swedish kronor, corresponding in today's money to around US$11 million (as of 2011), for the construction of permanent fortifications in Boden.

== Reason and decision ==
=== Why Boden? ===
Proposal of the Fortification Committee of 1897 (Note: All forts, plus the battery at Slumpberget, were supposed to have the 8 cm and 12 cm artillery pieces in armoured turrets. All other artillery was supposed to be at least semi-mobile. Nyström & Skeppstedt 1990, p. 109.)
| Fortification | Artillery | Arty crew | Inf crew |
|---|---|---|---|
| Degerberget Fort | 4×12 cm (4.7 in) haub 4×8 cm (3.1 in) kan 8×6 cm (2.4 in) kan | 288 men | 45 men |
| Mjösjöberget Fort | 4×12 cm kan 2×8 cm kan | 205 men | 22 men |
| Gammelängsberget Fort | 4×12 cm haub 5×8 cm kan | 234 men | 45 men |
| Södra Åberget Fort | 4×12 cm haub 4×8 cm kan | 206 men | 45 men |
| Rödberget Fort | 4×12 cm kan | 168 men | 22 men |
| Paglaberget Fort | 4×12 cm kan 4×6 cm kan | 134 men | 22 men |
| Leåkersberget Battery | 4×6 cm kan | 39 men | 0 men |
| Fällberget Battery | 2×6 cm kan | 19 men | 0 men |
| Norra Åberget Battery | 2×6 cm kan | 35 men | 0 men |
| Slumpberget Battery | 3×8 cm kan | 35 men | 0 men |
| Paglaberget Batteries | 4×6 cm kan | 40 men | 0 men |
| Avan Fortification | 6×8 cm kan | 91 men | 222 men |
| Svartbyträsket Fortification | 6×8 cm kan | 92 men | 222 men |
| Mobile batteries | 12×12 cm haub 12×8 cm kan | 264 men | 0 men |
| Total | 102 pieces | 1,868 men | 645 men |

The following year, in 1891, Rappe wrote a memorandum that explained in more detail the budget, which suddenly had risen to 4.5 million kronor, and would finance the construction of two strongholds at Paglaberget and Åberget with a total of six long cannon, ten howitzers and eight quick-firing cannon, all in armoured turrets, along with machine guns and bunkers, barracks and supply depots. The plan included a reserve battalion of 1,000 men, an artillery battalion of 600 men, an engineer company of 120 men, and supply and depot personnel. Axel Rappe's large study on the permanent fortifications of Sweden—a mandate given to him in 1882—was published in 1892 and cemented the view that a central fortress was needed in Boden to support and supply troops gathering between the Lule River and the eastern border, alongside the strengthening of the coastal defences at Stockholm, Gothenburg and Karlskrona.

Although Rappe did not completely rule out the possibility of a German or British attack on southern Sweden if the opportunity arose, he felt that Russia was the most realistic threat. There were only two plausible scenarios for war with Russia: either Sweden would become involved in a war between Germany and Russia which would feature southern and central Sweden as the battleground—and Rappe made no attempt to hide which country the General Staff wanted Sweden to side with in that case—or Russia would make a limited attack on Norrbotten to reach northern Norway and the Atlantic, an attack that Rappe earlier said was not very likely. Rappe had played down the strategic importance of the Ofoten and Iron Ore Lines and played up the importance of the main railway line to Boden, which was under discussion at that time, to speed up its completion. The railway to Boden was nearly finished by 1892, negating the need for Rappe to play that political game any longer. A railway line to Boden was of utmost need to be able to bring up troops to Lule River—the main line of defence—and a future fortress there.

During the following years a fierce debate raged between the supporters of the army on one side and the navy on the other. The proposed expansion of Swedish fortifications nationwide, which in turn would see less money spent on the fleet, upset many naval proponents, amongst them Wilhelm Dyrssen—later Minister for Defence—and Fredrik von Otter—later Admiral and Prime Minister of Sweden. They argued that the theory of central defence would leave large swathes of Swedish land in the hands of the enemy, and instead suggested smaller fortifications at the border, along with a strengthened navy. The debate was inconclusive and a request for 500,000 kronor to initiate construction of the fortress was not accepted by the government. Instead, they wanted a committee to further investigate all Swedish fortifications and possible new constructions of such. Thus the Fortification Committee of 1897 (1897 års fästningskommitté) was formed. The committee, led by chairman Jesper Crusebjörn, discussed and examined the defence of Norrland thoroughly, and also travelled to Boden where they climbed most of the heights and mountains that were considered for the fortifications. (Note: Even the chairman which—according to assistant secretary Melander—had "a pretty extensive corpus to carry around, did not fear toil and in own person climbed, even though slowly, the highest of all the mountains." Bergmark 1980, p. 526.) The selection of Boden as the most suitable place for the fortification, according to the committee's final report published 25 July 1898, had numerous reasons:

- The main rail line through Norrland crossed Lule River there.
- The intersection of the main line and the Luleå–Narvik line was located there.
- The most important road intersection in Norrbotten was located there.
- The most suitable river crossing sites over Lule River were located there.
- The distance to the coast was long enough to prevent a surprise attack by a naval landing force.
- The topography of the area was suitable for a modern fortress.

=== Final decision ===
A 1903 proposal for how the fort at Röderberget could look. Prominent features include the four armoured turrets for 15 cm howitzers, and the deep caponier ditch around the fort.

The report calculated the costs at 8.7 million kronor which corresponds in today's money to around $70 million (as of 2011), spent over a total construction schedule of one four-year period and two three-year periods. The cost was still considerably lower than that of many of the recently built or modernised fortifications on the continent; Belgium had spent the equivalent of 62 million kronor on the fortified positions of Liège and Namur along the Meuse while Romania had spent 63 million kronor to strengthen the defence of Bucharest and 16 million kronor on fortifications along the Siret. In 1899, Rappe proposed to the Riksdag—in line with the plans of the Fortification Committee—that construction of already existing fortificatory works in Sweden would commence, while the question on Boden would be postponed to the next year. The plan gained support from the first chamber but not from the second chamber, but when put to a joint vote of both chambers, the proposition passed. Even though the result did not really mean anything concrete for the possible construction in Boden, it was considered a great success for that question as well. During the last years of the century, the Riksdag's general attitude towards the army became more positive, most likely due to the increased Russification of Finland, increased tension in the Union between Sweden and Norway, and rumors that the Russian sawfilers that worked in Sweden also worked for the Okhrana, the secret Russian police.

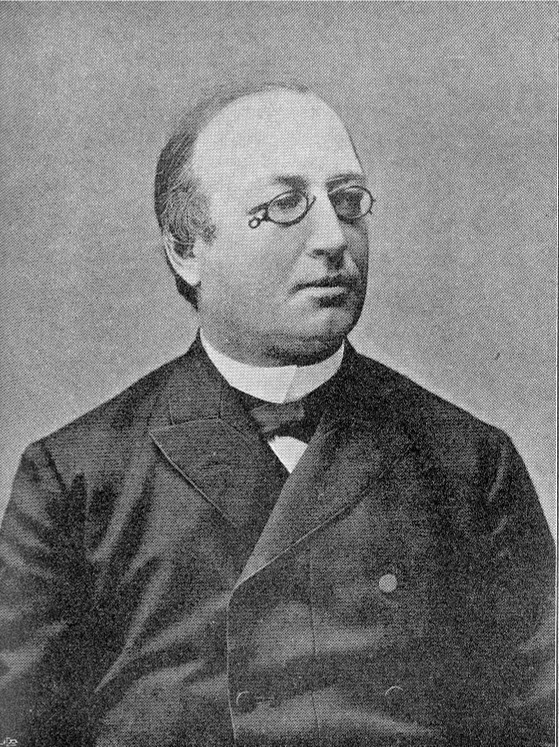
Erik Gustaf Boström, Prime Minister of Sweden at the time of the decision to construct the fortress.

Despite this progress, Axel Rappe left as Minister for War in 1899, due to setbacks on other issues. He was replaced by Jesper Crusebjörn, who inherited the Boden fortification project. Crusebjörn followed in the footsteps of Rappe—described as "the spiritual father of Boden Fortress" thanks to his efforts—as he proposed, in accordance with the committee's plan, that the Riksdag should allocate an initial sum of 560,000 kronor which would be used to initiate construction of Boden Fortress. (Note: There is some confusion regarding the sum as Nyström & Skeppstedt 1990, p. 70 instead mentions less than half, 260,000 kronor.) Crusebjörn also maintained the belief of his predecessor, and of the committee in which he was chairman, that Boden Fortress when completed should act as the operational base for all troops attached for the defence of Norrbotten, that it should serve as a supply fortress for troops stationed between it and the front line, and that it also should serve as a blocking fortress in case of a Russian surprise attack. The 1897 committee also had set the goal to have Boden Fortress in a finished state when the Haparanda Line found its way through to the border against Finland.

The result of the votes—held 7 May 1900, a date which can be seen as the birth of the fortress—in the first and second chambers were the same as the previous year. The first chamber was overwhelmingly for the proposal with the result 108–16, but the proponents feared a defeat in the second chamber. During the debate both the Prime Minister of Sweden Erik Gustaf Boström and Jesper Crusebjörn threatened to resign from their posts if the proposal was not accepted, to exert pressure on the second chamber. Boström expressed the following that day:

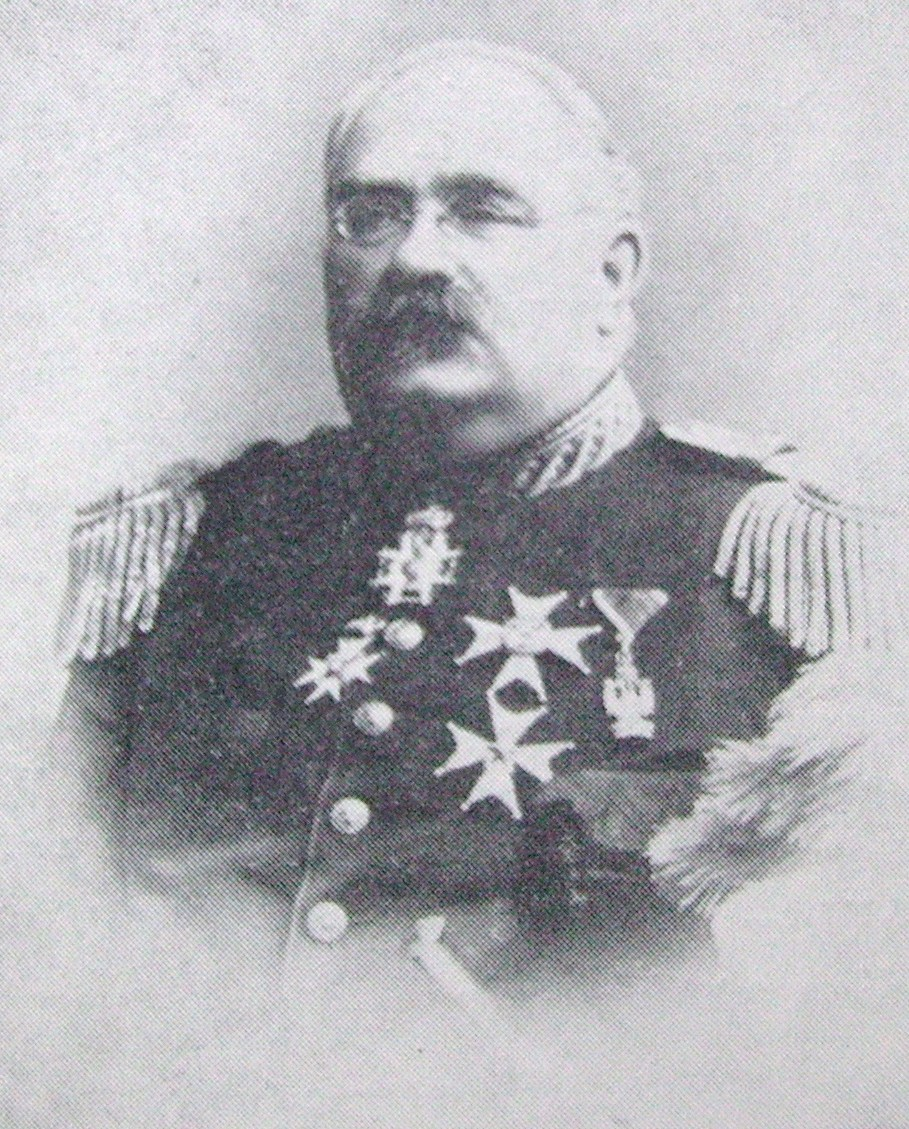
Jesper Crusebjörn, Minister for War and the driving force behind the decision to construct Boden Fortress.

For believe me gentlemen, I consider this question so important that in the same moment I get the definite answer that it is not embraced by the Swedish Riksdag, I will no longer stay in this place.

Even after this, the second chamber voted against the proposal, with a vote count of 73–130. Neither Boström nor Crusebjörn resigned, since after further discussion and voting it was decided that the matter should be settled by a joint vote. The first chamber voted in favor, 125–14, while the second chamber voted against, 87–135, with a total outcome of 212–149 in favour of constructing Boden Fortress and allocating the funds needed to start construction. Funding for the purchase of the land that the fortifications were to be built on had largely been provided several years in advance by two voluntary organisations. The Organisation for the Fortified Defence of Upper Norrland (Föreningen för Övre Norrlands fasta försvar) and the Swedish Women's Organisation (Svenska Qvinnoföreningen) had collected 71,000 kronor out of the 131,000 kronor needed for land purchase.

== Construction ==
=== Initial work ===
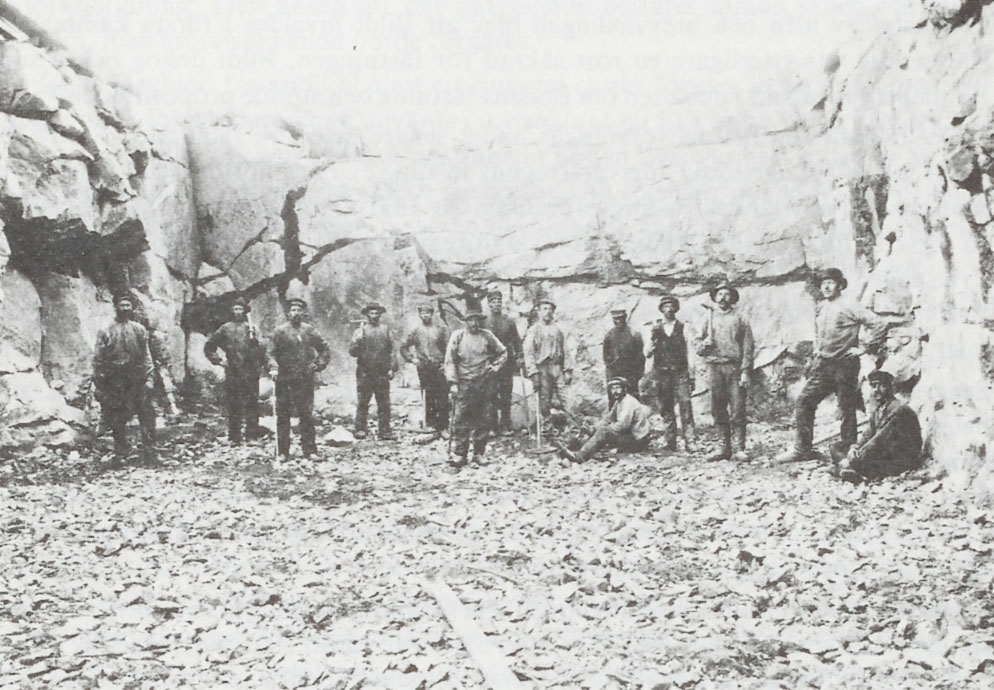
Workers on break from their blasting duties during construction of one of the forts.

The main inspiration for the design—in which the forts are blasted into the mountains rather than constructed on top of them—came from Vaberget Fortress near Karlsborg Fortress. Vaberget Fortress was built in the 1890s and its southern fort was the first fort in the world that fully used the protection provided by the bedrock itself by having all of its functions embedded in the mountain. Vaberget Fortress served as a prototype for Boden Fortress and many more future fortifications in Sweden, including the late 20th century fixed army and coastal artillery batteries that gave the Swedish Fortifications Agency world renown. Preparatory work was started in 1900 and consisted of a diverse number of tasks, ranging from purchase of beds for the construction workers, construction of a new loading site for the railway, building roads to the various construction sites and clearing the land of those sites. The plan for the Fortifications at Boden (Befästningarna vid Boden)—which was the term used until the First World War when the present name Boden Fortress came into widespread use—was largely based on the proposal laid forward by the Fortification Committee of 1897, with only minor modifications.

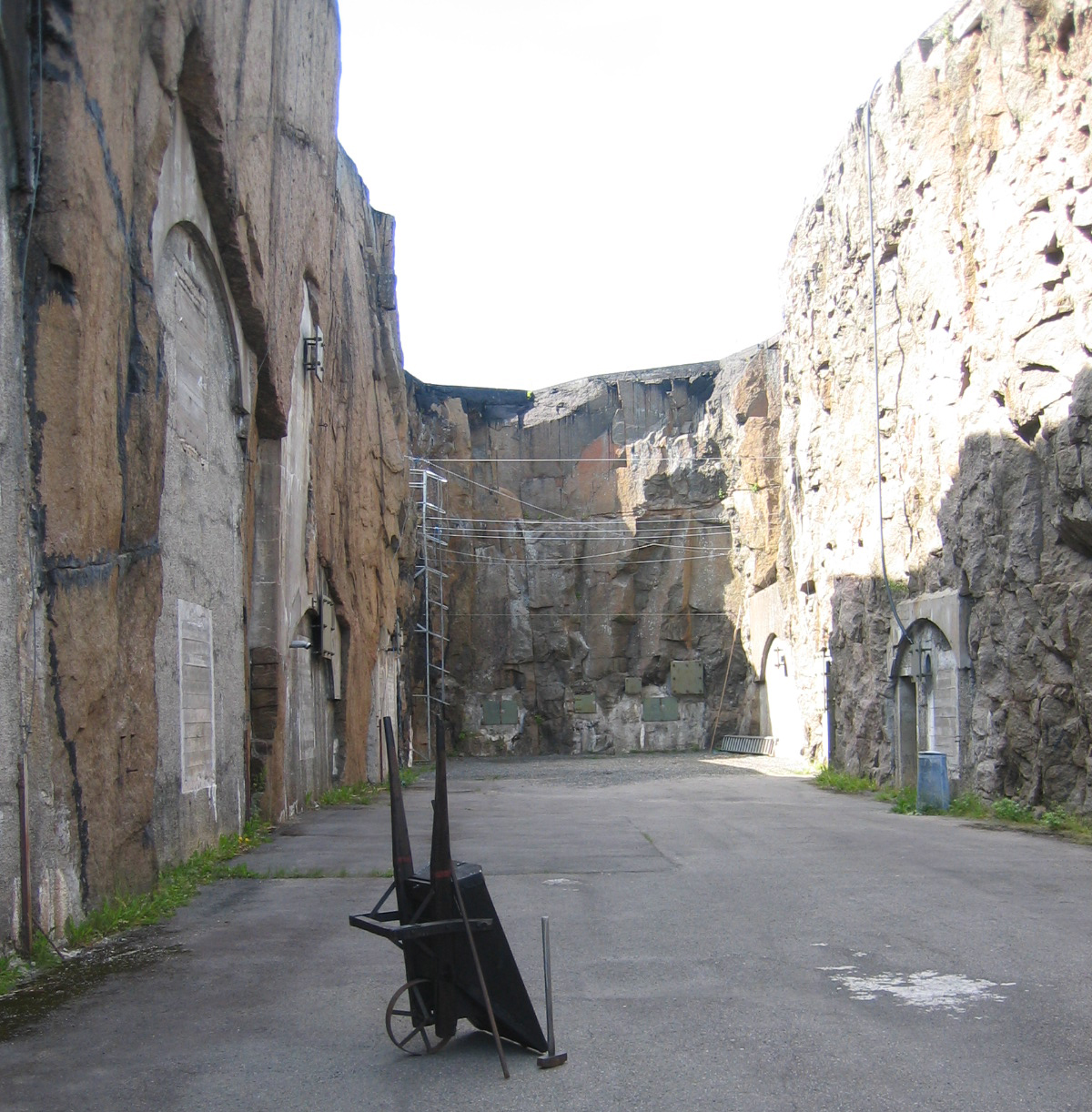
A view down a ditch at one of the forts. Equipment used during the construction can be seen. The picture below is a closeup of what is located at the far end of this ditch.

Even before any construction work had started the cost of the forts had been estimated to exceed the previous calculations by fifty percent. In December 1901, only few months after the first blasting work that had been done at Gammelängsberget in July 1901, the cost for the four forts northeast of the river was expected to be sixty-five percent more expensive than the initial calculation. The blueprints of the forts at Degerberget, Gammelängsberget and Södra Åberget were the first to be confirmed, which happened on 11 May 1901. The fort at Mjösjöberget followed suit on 3 April 1902 and the last fort to get a confirmed blueprint was the fort at Rödberget, on 19 May 1903. The last proposed fort, at Paglaberget, was deleted from the plans in 1906—along with the batteries at Fällberget and Slumpberget as well as the fortifications at Avan and Svartbyträsket—before any work on the fort had started, due to the proposal of the new Fortification Committee of 1905, which was formed following the reports of the large rise in costs. On 9 February 1906, the current Minister for War Lars Tingsten calculated the total cost to end at 19,220,000 kronor, more than twice the cost reported by the 1897 committee.

All work on the large masses of bedrock was conducted by hand, without any help of powered machines, as the first power station in Boden was not constructed until almost ten years later in 1909. The first work that was done at the site was to create a large ditch, 9–12 metres (30–39 ft) wide and with a depth of 6 metres (20 ft) or more, that would surround the core of the fort. Creating patrol trenches and placements for the turrets on the top of the forts was also work done early on. The teams of workers would first bore down in the bedrock using pinch bars and sledgehammers, then use black powder to blast the rock into manageable pieces which could be transported away from the site, using wheelbarrows, horse-drawn carriages and in some cases Decauville railways. When the ditch, or parts of it, had been completed, work started on the inner part of the fort by boring horizontally from the bottom of the ditch into the mountain itself. This work was a lot harder—the cost for each cubic metre of blasted tunnel was five times the cost of a cubic metre of blasted ditch—both due to the confined space in the tunnels and the risk of damaging the bedrock. The use of black powder instead of dynamite reduced the risk of bedrock damage, but it also increased the time needed to complete the tunnels. All in all, the amount of bedrock bored, blasted, loaded and transported away from the forts has been estimated to be around 300,000 cubic metres (11,000,000 cu ft). (Note: Nyström & Skeppstedt 1990, p. 329 says that the total volume of bedrock that was blasted was more than 241,000 cubic metres (8,500,000 cu ft), while Lidström 2005, p. 4 says that it "supposedly" was around 350,000 cubic metres (12,000,000 cu ft).)

=== Finishing touches ===
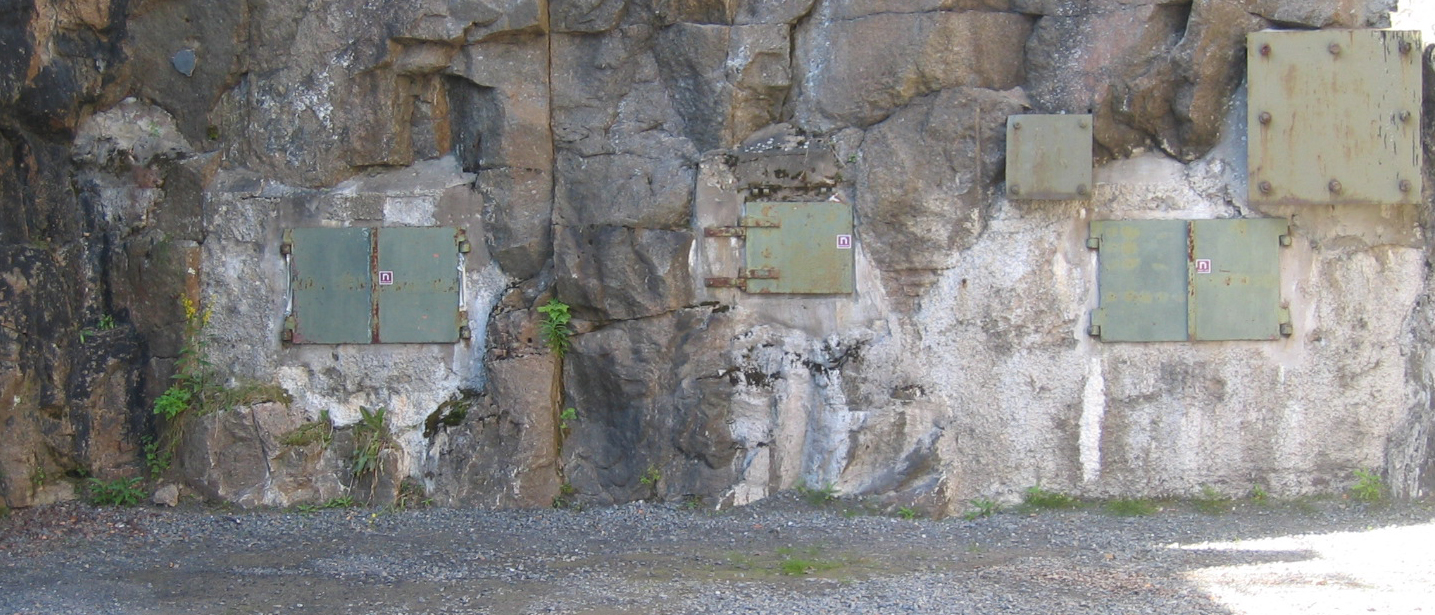
One of the counterscarp galleries at Rödberget Fort. 57 mm caponier cannon (kaponjärkanoner) and machine guns were stationed behind the green armoured hatches, ready to fire at any intruder in the ditch.

When the ditches and tunnels were finished, concrete works started, including flooring, construction of joist systems in forts with second floors, staircases, partition walls and counterscarp galleries. Water wells were bored to a depth of up to 200 metres (660 ft) to guarantee water supply, since the forts were supposed to be self-supporting. However, the most demanding part of the project was the construction, transport and installation of the armoured turrets and the armament itself. Two companies had been previously contracted for the construction of other fortifications in Sweden, Swedish AB Bofors-Gullspång and French Compagnie des Forges de Châtillon, offers from both companies existed already in 1901, but it was not until after tests conducted in December 1902 that the Swedish company was contracted and given royal approval on 26 May 1903. The order was for the 8.4 cm (3.3 in) and 12 cm (4.7 in) pieces that was to be mounted on the first three forts. The following two forts at Rödberget and Mjösjöberget were to have 15 cm (5.9 in) pieces, an order Bofors would get as well, but due to the time factor a few of those were actually delivered by the French company.

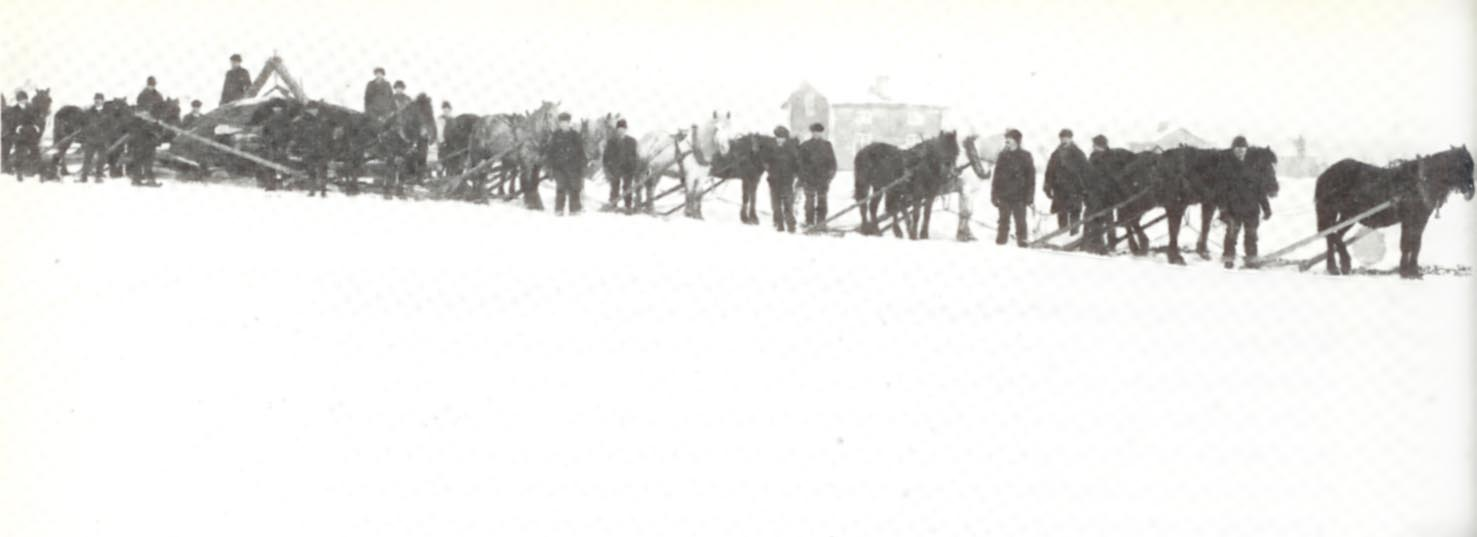
Horses and sleighs were used to transport the turrets to their final destinations.

The cost of a single armoured turret for a 12 cm piece was almost 100,000 kronor—around $800,000 (as of 2011) in today's money—and it could weigh as much as 100 tonnes (220,000 lb). It was delivered in parts to simplify transport, but the heaviest part still had a weight of 26 tonnes (57,000 lb). The parts were delivered by rail up to Boden and unloaded with the help of gantry cranes. As the roads of the time could not handle the weight during summer, transport had to wait until winter when the frost had hardened the ground. The turret parts were lifted onto sleighs drawn by 16–30 horses depending on the situation. The toughest stretch, up the mountain, was handled with the help of block and tackle, the ditch was crossed on temporarily built sturdy wooden bridges and the mounting of the turret was finished with cranes. A major part of the mounts for the turrets were completed by the end of 1905, despite the harsh winter working conditions, with temperatures falling below −40 °C (−40 °F) at times. The peak workforce amounted to around 900 men, (Note: Fästningsguiden gives a slightly higher number of 1,200 men.) but their numbers fluctuated, with the lowest number of active workers during the winter months. The first artillery test firing was conducted on 15 January 1907 when the guns at Gammelängsberget fired their first rounds, and all five forts "were in a defensible state" by 1908.

=== Other fortification works ===
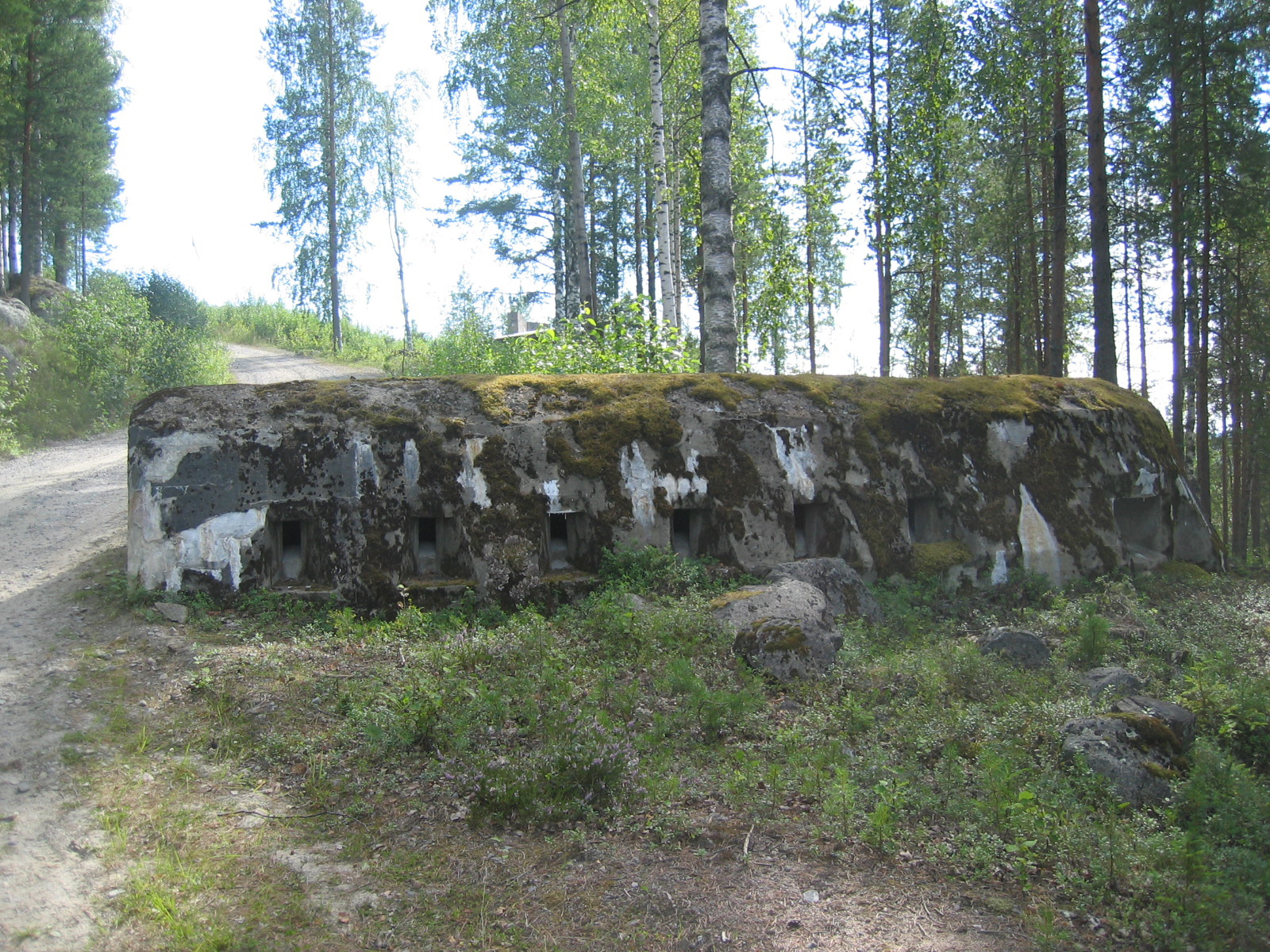
One of many concrete bunkers built all around Boden, this one is located on the west slope of Rödberget. Only a short part of the so-called "sausage" and some of its rifle loopholes can be seen here, this particular bunker is about 50 metres (160 ft) long in total.

Apart from the forts, the garrison itself was heavily expanded during the initial construction years and became the largest garrison in Sweden, taking an exceptional position in Swedish military history of the 20th century; even at the start of the 21st century, Boden was the largest garrison city in the Swedish Army. Still, no other fortifications than the forts themselves were finished by 1908, and work now started to fill the holes in between them. It was realised that prepared positions were needed for the mobile batteries, and apart from those, three larger battery positions (sometimes called fästen, strongholds) were also constructed at Leåkersberget, Norra Åberget and Svedjeberget. These works were started in 1911 and were finished during the First World War. The last of the three strongholds was positioned in the mountain itself with embrasures in the mountain side, (Note: The battery on Svedjeberget is often referred to as a fort—especially in post-decommission promotional and tourist material—but that is incorrect, see for example Kartaschew 2000, pp. 4–6.) and Leåkersberget had parts of the battery position inside the mountain, but the gun emplacements outside—the other positions were concrete fortifications above the ground, some inside a bunker and others behind a parapet.

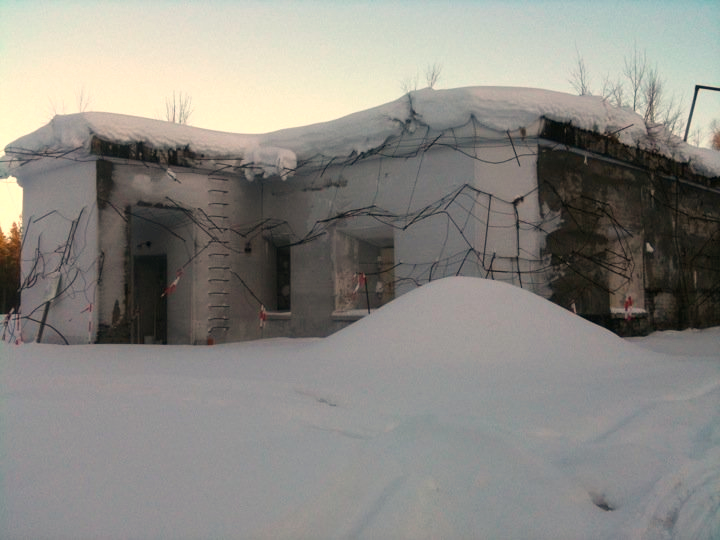
Boden Fortress Radio Bunker, just south of Degerberget Fort, was used for the first radio broadcast in Swedish history.

The main fortifications for infantry consisted of 44 concrete bunkers, 23 dugouts and 26 fortified observation posts. The concrete bunkers (infanteriskansar, redoubts) were long and narrow. The longest, Abramsskansen, was 155 metres (509 ft) long and had room for 160 men and four machine guns, but most had room for less than 80 men—usually a rifle platoon reinforced with a machine gun section and an anti-tank section. Due to their length, their curved shapes following the mountain sides, and other characteristics, the bunkers were popularly referred to as "sausages" (korvar). The construction of these started in 1911. Many officers still considered the fortress to have inadequate and too few fortifications for the infantry, and one officer compared the fortress to "a shoe, which is too large for the foot." One million kronor was allocated in 1915 to fix that problem, and many minor fortifications were built during the First World War.

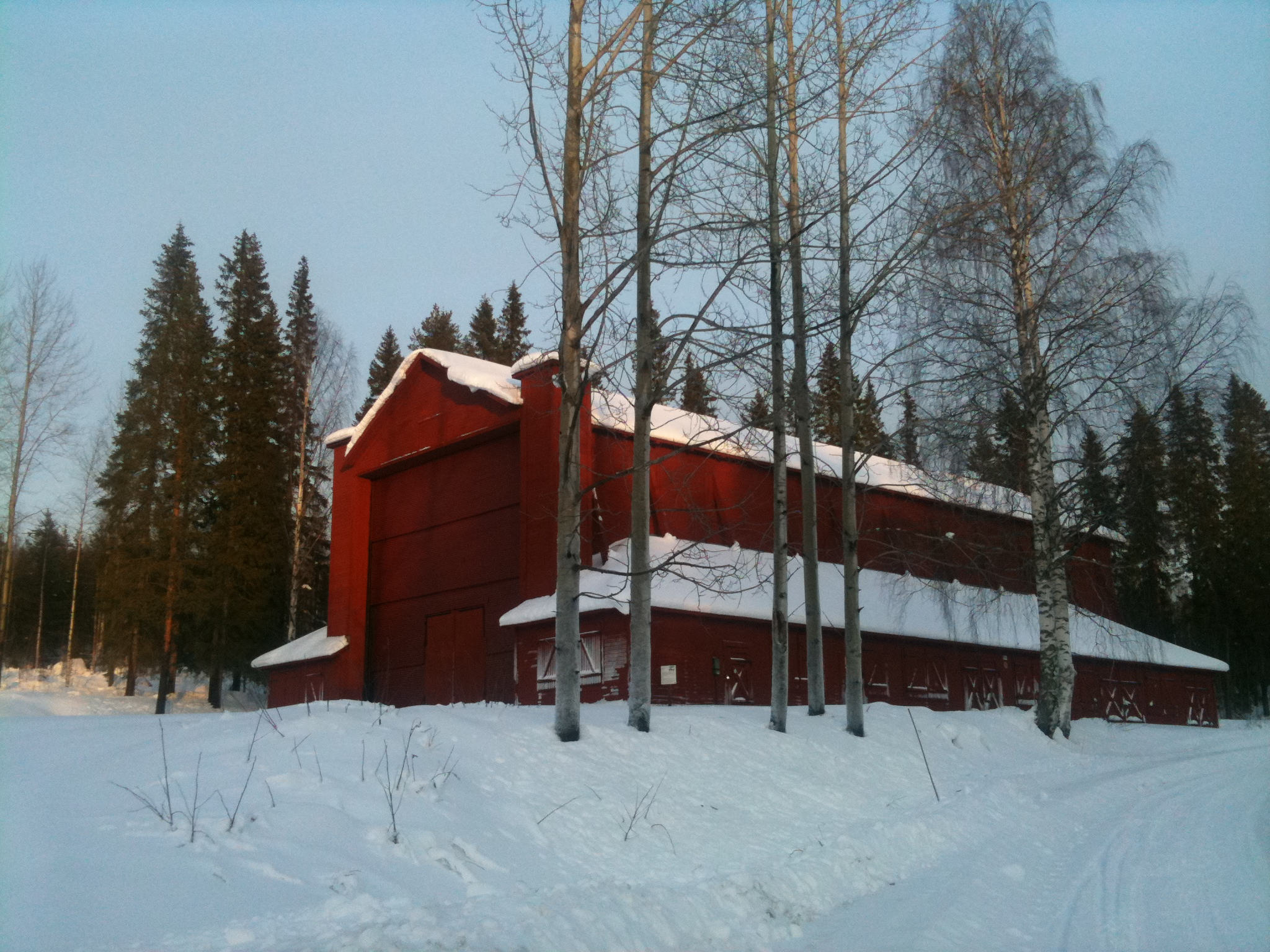
The Balloon Hangar in 2011. A wooden building, it was finished in 1914 and is the only one of its kind in Sweden.

Blockhouses were also built by the railway bridge at Trångforsen and the road bridge Hedenbron (built from 1911 to 1912), located just 1.5 kilometres (0.93 mi) southeast of the Trångforsen bridge. The later was built to accommodate easier access to Rödberget Fort and the military training area on the southwestern shore of Lule River and was at the time of completion the longest single span road bridge in Sweden.

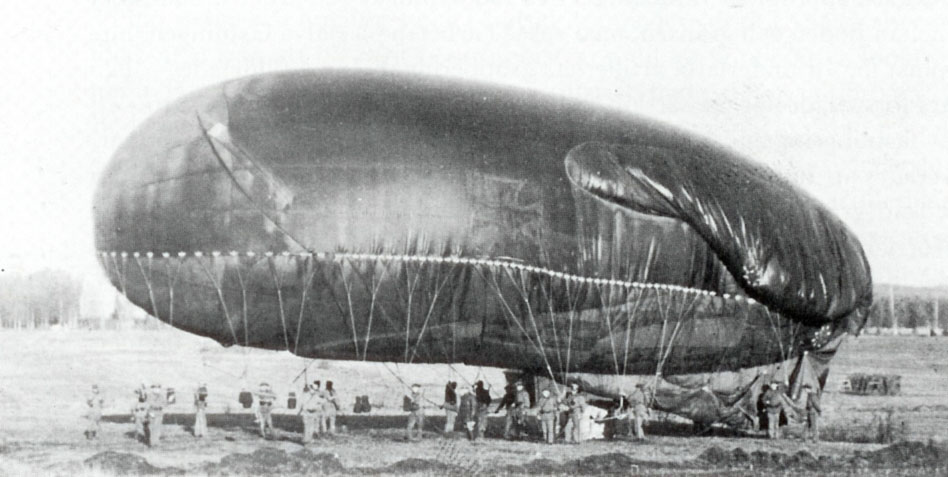
The first balloon of the garrison, used for artillery observation and reconnaissance, seen during an exercise in 1914.

Both internal and external communication systems as well as means of reconnaissance were needed, both directed by the commandant located in the headquarters building. The building—finished in 1910—had three floors, the upper two functioned as home and workplace for the commandant and the chief of staff, while the ground floor had extra thick walls and functioned as the command post for the fortress. A large field telephone network was built, connecting all forts with the headquarters. Liaison with higher commands was at first maintained by regular post, telegraph and telephone. The fortress' radio station was finished by 1914, originally for the Swedish Navy, and was located south of Degerberget on a bog now known as the "Radio Mire" (Radiomyren). The first Swedish radio broadcasts were sent from this building. The fortress also had homing pigeons for sending messages. At the end of the Second World War, around 280 such pigeons were stationed in Boden. The pigeons were part of the balloon department whose main task was to operate the balloon of the garrison. For this, the Balloon Hangar with inner measurements of 35×10×10 metres (115×33×33 ft) was built near the radio station. More than fifty men were attached to the department, of whom two could follow the balloon up to its maximum height of 1,000 metres (3,300 ft), limited by the length of the wire connecting it to the ground. The hydrogen-filled balloon itself was of German make and measured 27 metres (89 ft) in length, had a diameter of around 7 metres (23 ft) and a total volume of 750 cubic metres (26,000 cu ft).

== In operation ==
=== Two World Wars ===
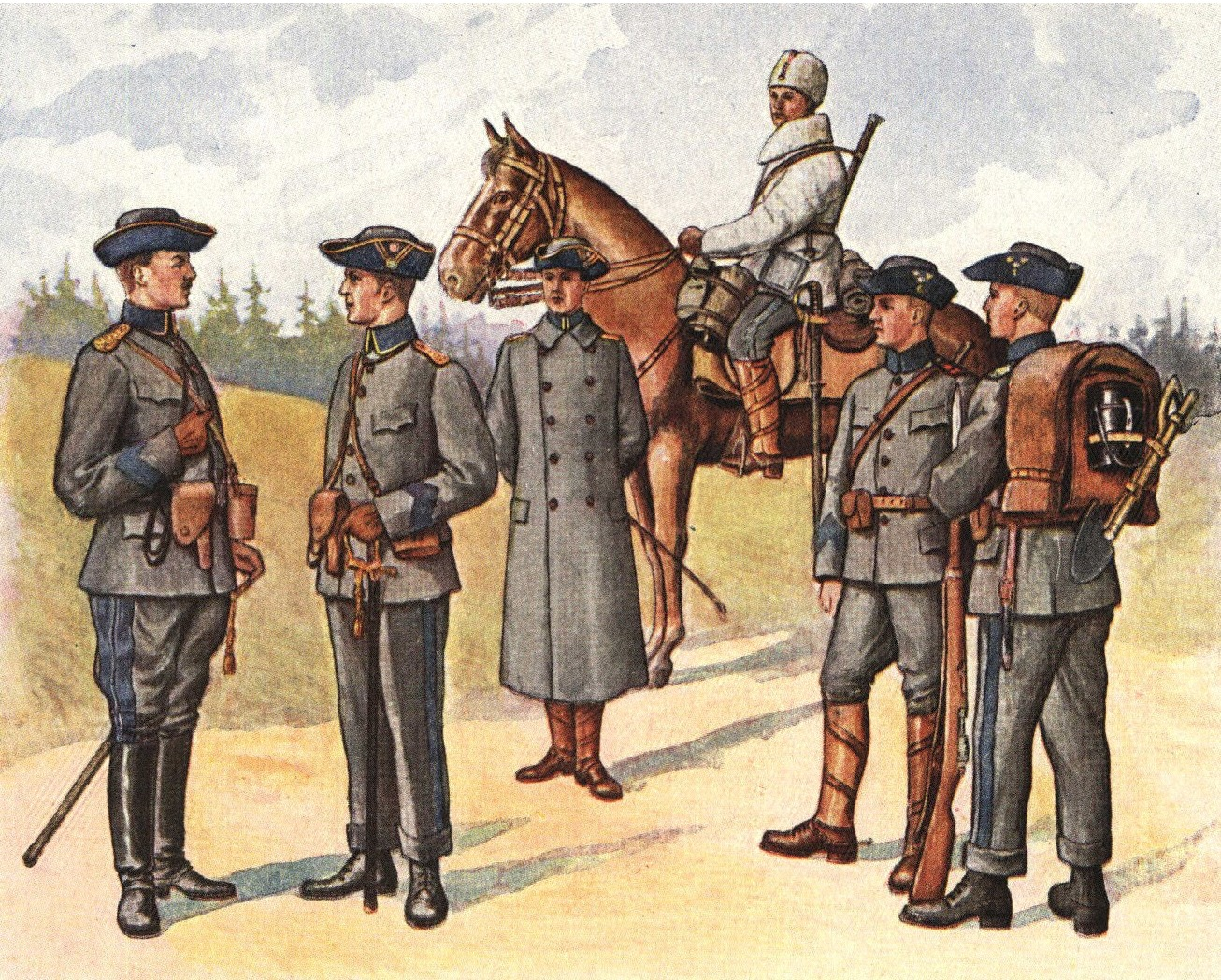
Soldiers as seen during the early interwar period. From left to right; general staff captain and infantry lieutenant in battledress, infantry major in dress uniform, cavalry private in winter uniform, artillery and infantry private in battledress.

Most parts of the fortress were finished during the First World War, and many minor works were started and completed during the course of the war. Even though Sweden remained neutral during the First and Second World War, the start and outcome of both had large impact on the fortress. Finland's independence during the First World War created a buffer state between Sweden and Imperial Russia's successor state, the Soviet Union, which radically changed the strategic value of northern Sweden, put the usefulness of Boden Fortress into question. Only the most basic needs were satisfied during the interwar period; even apparent needs—based on the experiences from the war—such as better air defence and fortifications to halt or temporarily impede attacks by armoured forces were neglected. Thanks to local commanders, construction of new fortifications and improvements to already existing ones were done with the help of garrisoned troops. Engineer companies built new shelters and trenches as training, and the telephone network was improved and completed by the garrisoned telegraph company. This cut the cost drastically as the only expenditure was the needed material.

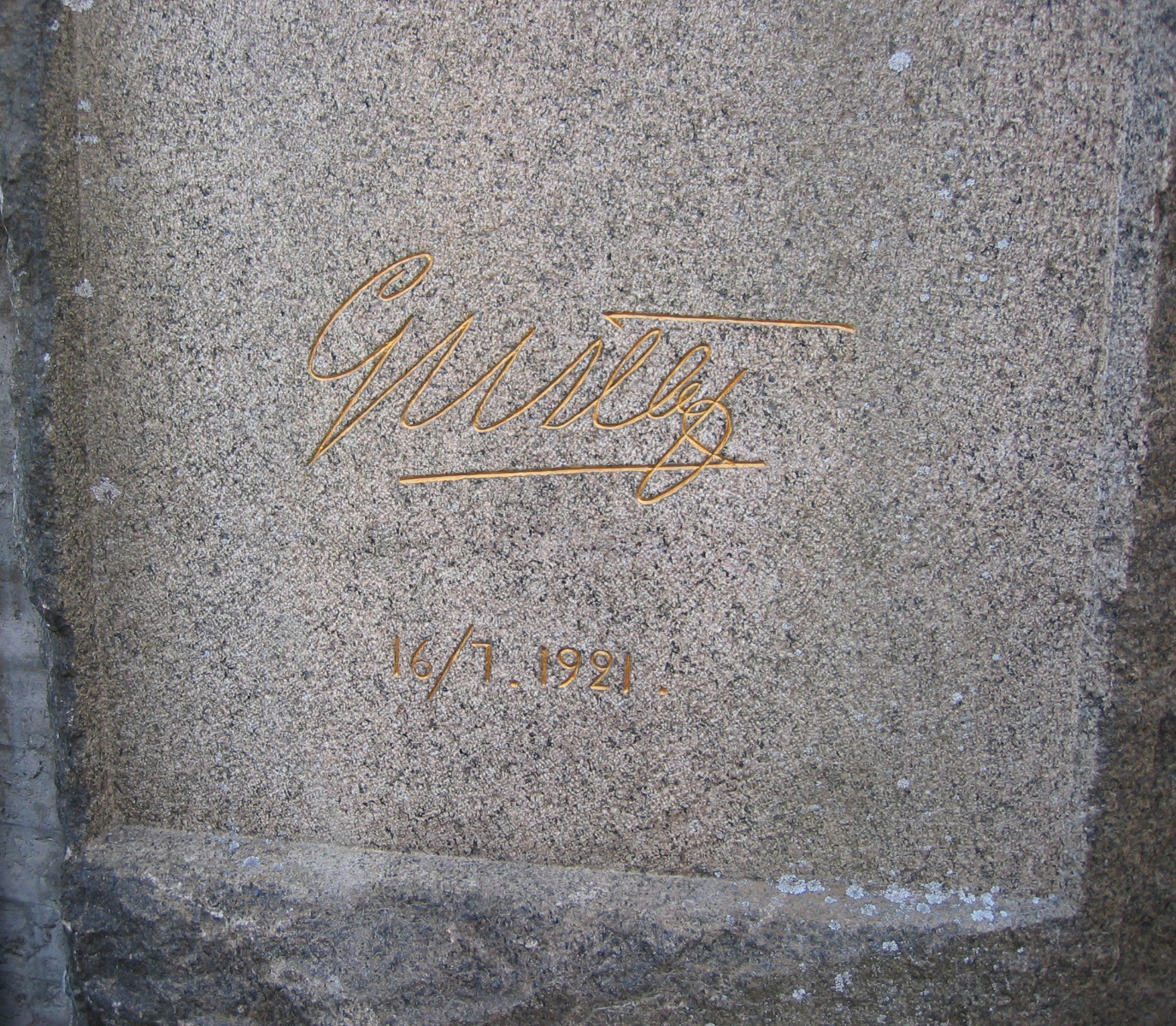
King Gustaf V put his autograph on one of the ditch walls of Rödberget Fort on 16 July 1921.

Only a few necessary projects were funded, including an underground headquarters bunker, improvement of the garrison hospital and new training areas. It was not until the increased tension in Europe following Adolf Hitler's rise to power, Benito Mussolini's March on Rome and the outbreak of the Spanish Civil War that focus once again was put on military readiness and prepared fortifications. Improvements were made to fortifications in many parts of Sweden during the last years of the 1930s following the German annexation of Austria and occupation of Czechoslovakia. In Boden, this included building underground storage rooms for ammunition and food, replenishing already existing stocks, increasing protection for other important supply functions—such as the waterworks—as well as further military planning and also preparations for destruction of—for an advancing enemy—important bridges and roads.

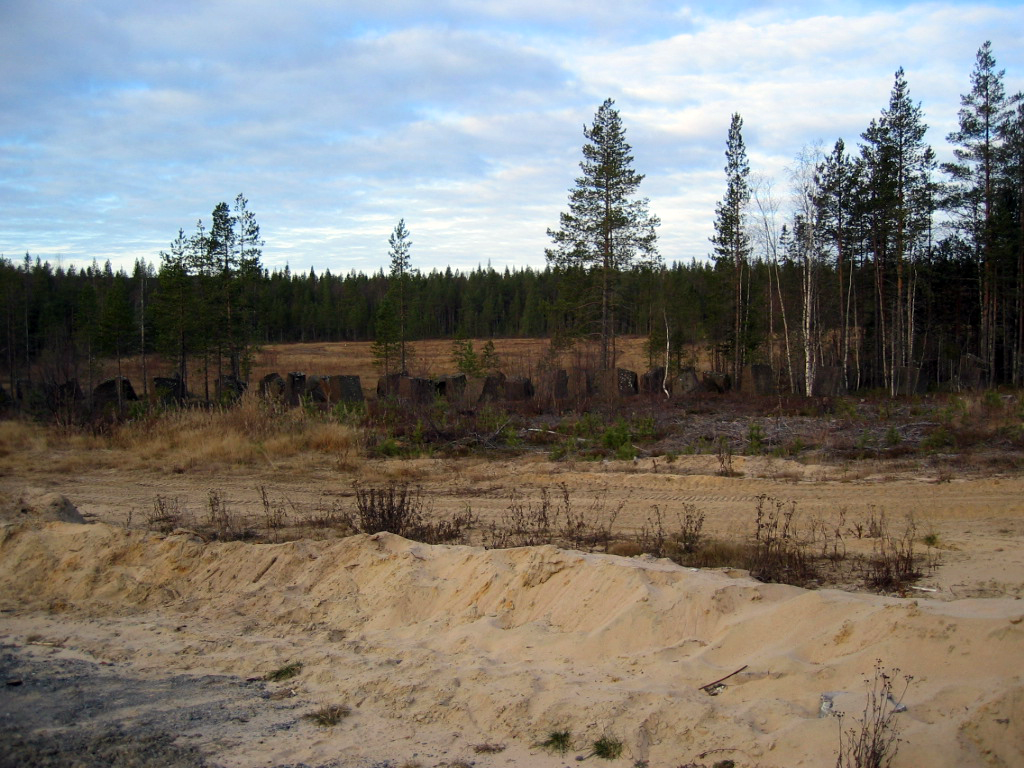
A line of dragon's teeth made of stone in the distance, about one kilometre west of Rödberget Fort. These stones, placed there during the Second World War formed the southwesternmost line of defence of Boden Fortress.

When the Second World War broke out, only limited resources were allotted to the defence of Northern Sweden, but following the Soviet attack on Finland a few months later and the German Operation Weserübung against Norway and Denmark the next year, major work on improving and extending the defensive lines was commenced. Bunkers, bomb shelters, gun emplacements—particularly for anti-tank guns—were built by the units that had been mobilised and stationed in the vicinity of Boden. The Finnish experiences gained from meeting superior armoured forces during the Winter War were adopted in Sweden, and triple rows of large stones or blocks of reinforced concrete, dragon's teeth, soon formed a continuous line—defended by anti-tank guns in concrete bunkers and machine-gun nests—around the fortress and city. As the war continued and advances in most fields of warfare were made, Boden Fortress was continually improved to meet new or increased threats such as air, armoured or gas attacks. The command, supply and intelligence services were improved as well.

As Sweden has remained neutral since 1816, Boden Fortress was never put to the test. Nonetheless, there are a few indications on how Boden, the garrison, the fortress and its crew would have come through a wartime attack. Already in 1904, Lars Tingsten—commander of Norrbotten Regiment, later Minister for War and first commander of Boden Fortress—expressed worries over the low number of soldiers that were planned to garrison the town. The 1892 army war plans had two infantry battalions stationed in the area, and allowed for three or four more to be transferred there, while Tingsten reported that the battalions should number at least 24 and perhaps even 33. The lack of personnel, and even more the lack of organisation, was shown when the fortress was tested against a coup de main during a military exercise in April 1913. Led by its commander Bror Munck, the cavalry regiment Crown Prince's Hussar Regiment managed to seize control of the railway station, the railway bridge, the ordnance depot, the electric works and the waterworks in the matter of a day. When the unit reached the headquarters building, Tingsten, now commandant of the fortress, saw his earlier worries come true. Despite this, the wartime infantry garrison was no more than four battalions in 1937. But as the Second World War came to its end, the fortress had been given a new role. From 1943 on it was no longer meant to stand on its own against a besieging enemy, and instead became only one piece in a larger network of fortifications. The wartime strength was never more than 12,000–13,000 men, while calculations talked about at least 25,000 men, up to 40,000 men, were needed to withstand a siege.

=== Espionage ===
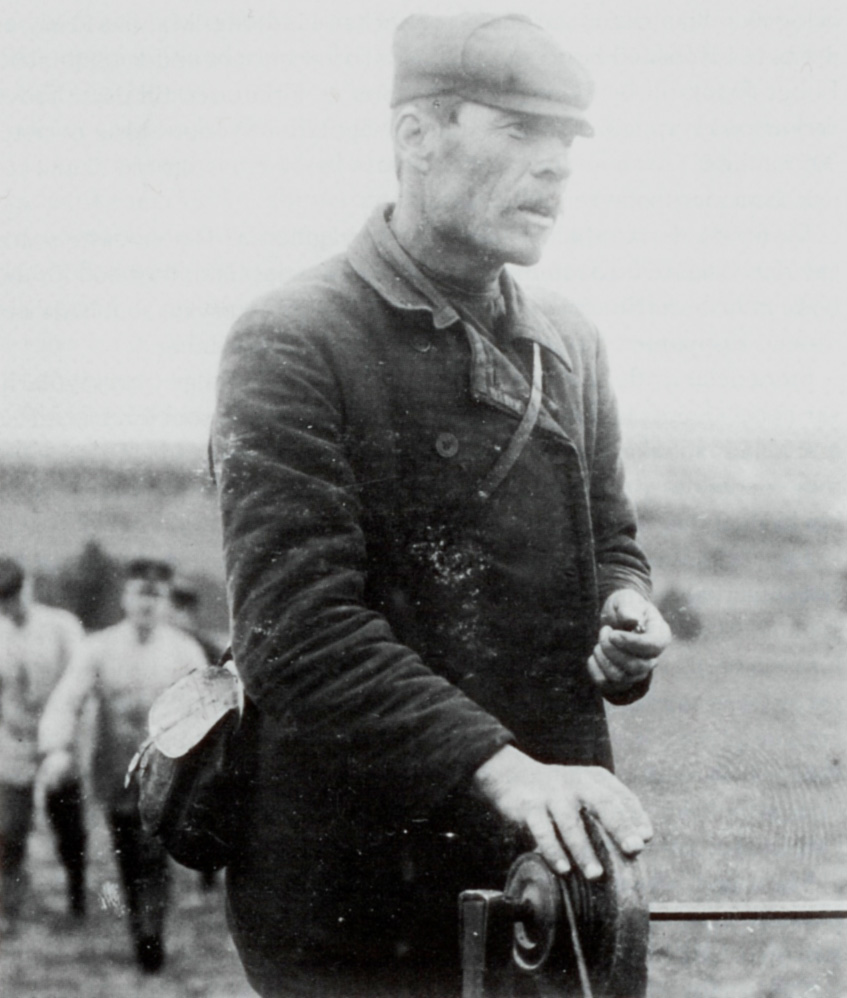
The Russian sawfiler Peter Alexandrovich Boboshkin from Nizhny Novgorod Governorate travelled through northern Sweden, from Kiruna to Hudiksvall in the spring of 1910, and passed through Boden. When this picture was taken in March that year (location unknown), he had placed his filing machine on military territory.

Strict secrecy surrounded the fortress for a very long time, and there were several attempts made by foreign powers to gain knowledge of various kinds of information. One early possible attempt at espionage were the Russian sawfilers who travelled through Sweden, mostly in Norrland during the last years of the 19th century and the years leading up to World War I. A large part of the Swedish population believed that the sawfilers, no more than 300 in total in Sweden, were spies hired by the Okhrana, the Russian secret police. Some sources are of the belief that the sawfilers were never sent out on specific missions but instead acted as unknowing spies, only having contact with the Okhrana who interrogated them regarding their experiences when they returned to Russia. Other sources claim that at least some of the sawfilers that the Okhrana found most useful were educated in the art of espionage, and were in fact given specific missions, as well as being paid 300 rouble per season for their work. Another form of this kind of legal espionage is believed to have been conducted by the German Wandervogel movement during the late interwar period.

The first known attempt of purposeful espionage against the fortress was conducted in 1913–14. A former lieutenant in the Danish coastal artillery, A. B. Fredrikssen, was enlisted in Copenhagen by the Russian military attaché in Stockholm, colonel Assanovitch. Fredrikssen was sent to Boden with the task to explore the fortress and its surroundings. He and his wife stayed at a boarding house in the city, and had regular correspondence with his employer who stayed in Copenhagen. It was also the correspondence that exposed the attempt, which was not very successful in terms of information gained by the Russians. They had better luck in late 1914 with two brothers named Hiukka, who both served with one of the artillery regiments in Boden, Norrland Artillery Regiment. They were discovered due to their extravagant living, and it was found out that one of the brothers—despite his employment in the army—had Finnish-Russian citizenship. They had provided intelligence to Russia, but the full extent of the affair was never disclosed. A minor case of German espionage was exposed during the Second World War. The first permanently stationed German officer in Luleå, a Hauptmann Schultz, was caught photographing parts of the fortifications and was deported. It is probable that his espionage was not ordered from any higher command but was an act on own initiative. (Note: In a private conversation with the author, he stated that it is likely that the officer's name was Schulte rather than Schultz, however it is not entirely clear which name is correct.)

Two extensive espionage cases in Sweden during the Cold War involved Boden Fortress, both exposed in 1951. The Enbom case involved Fritiof Enbom, a former worker at the Swedish State Railways in Boden, and later the local editor for the communist newspaper Norrskensflamman. He was exposed by his own careless talk—often under the influence of alcohol—to the owners of the house in Stockholm where he had lodged since he moved there from Boden. The family told the Swedish Security Service after the Christmas holidays of 1951, and Enbom was arrested on 16 February 1952. During interrogation, he confessed that he—from February 1943 to April 1951—had met with Soviet employers around 25 times. Enbom had provided a large variety of intelligence, most of it from public sources, but also secrets, of which the armament of one of the forts in the fortress was one of the pieces of information that concerned Boden Fortress and nearby fortifications. He was sentenced to lifetime hard labour, but was released after ten years. The other case involved Ernst Hilding Andersson, who was arrested on 21 September 1951. He had carried out seven missions for the Soviets and had provided them primarily with information regarding the Swedish Navy, but also information on the fortifications along the Norrland coast, and an initiated report about Boden Fortress and the air force unit located in Boden and Luleå, Norrbotten Air Base Corps. Andersson was, like Fritjof Enbom, sentenced to hard labour for life.

== End and aftermath ==
=== Cold War and decommission ===
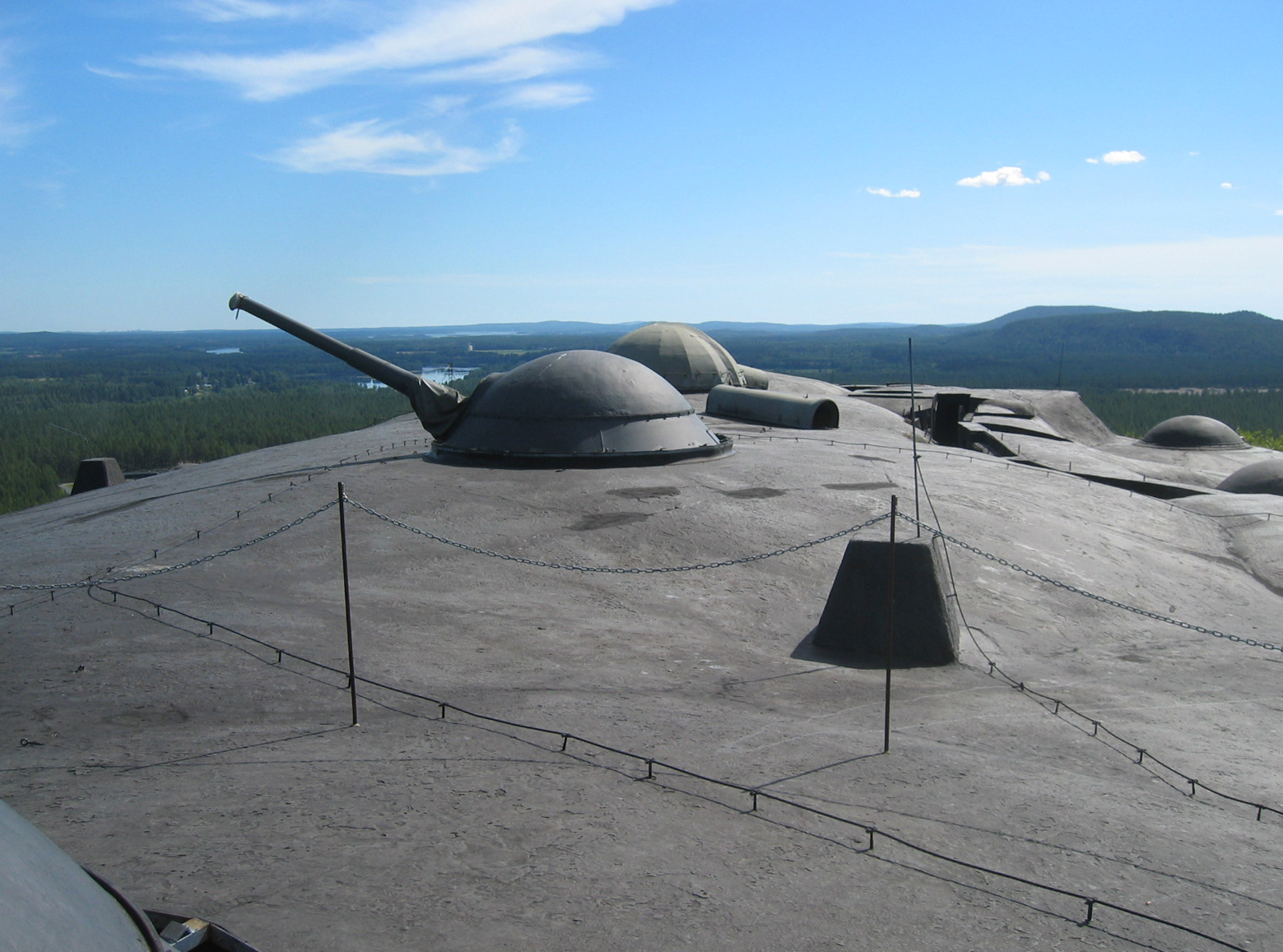
Two of four armoured turrets for the 12 cm cannon (replacing the 15 cm howitzers in 1976) on top of Rödberget Fort.

The fortress was gradually modernised in the decades following the Second World War, including newer main artillery for some of the forts and newer secondary artillery for all forts as well as other improvements. But the development of new weapons and the evolution of warfare during the Cold War gradually decreased the importance of the fortifications. Weapons such as cruise missiles and smart bombs made large static fortifications such as Boden Fortress obsolete when they demonstrated their worth during the Gulf War in 1991. Mjösjöberget Fort had been decommissioned and removed from the wartime organisation twelve years earlier in 1979, (Note: Dig Maps 2001 says that Mjösjöberget Fort was removed from the wartime organisation one year earlier, in 1978. The date of decommission might have been 31 December 1978, which possibly could have been transformed into "removed in 1979" and "removed in 1978" respectively.) and less than ten years after the Gulf War and the collapse of the Soviet Union, the four other forts followed suit. The last shot was fired from Rödberget on 14:11 local time on 31 December 1997, and exactly one year later, on 31 December 1998, that last fort was decommissioned after 90 years in service.

All five forts and three battery positions—Leåkersberget, Norra Åberget and Södra Slumpberget—were declared historic buildings in the summer of 1998 and are to be preserved for the future. The balloon hangar, the only of its kind in Sweden, was declared a historic building three years later in 2001. Two forts, Rödberget and Södra Åberget, are held in operation, and the former is used as a tourist attraction with guided tours, and there is also a possibility for companies to hold smaller conferences inside the fort. Over 10,000 visitors were expected to visit Rödberget Fort in 2002, averaging 300 a day during the summer. Boden Fortress is also still one of the salute batteries of Sweden, which fire a 21-gun salute at special occasions such as the National holiday of Sweden and birthdays of some members of the Swedish Royal Family. The fortress was made a salute battery on 2 June 1931, but since the forts have been decommissioned, the salute is now fired with four cannon located at Kvarnängen in central Boden.

=== Myths and impact ===
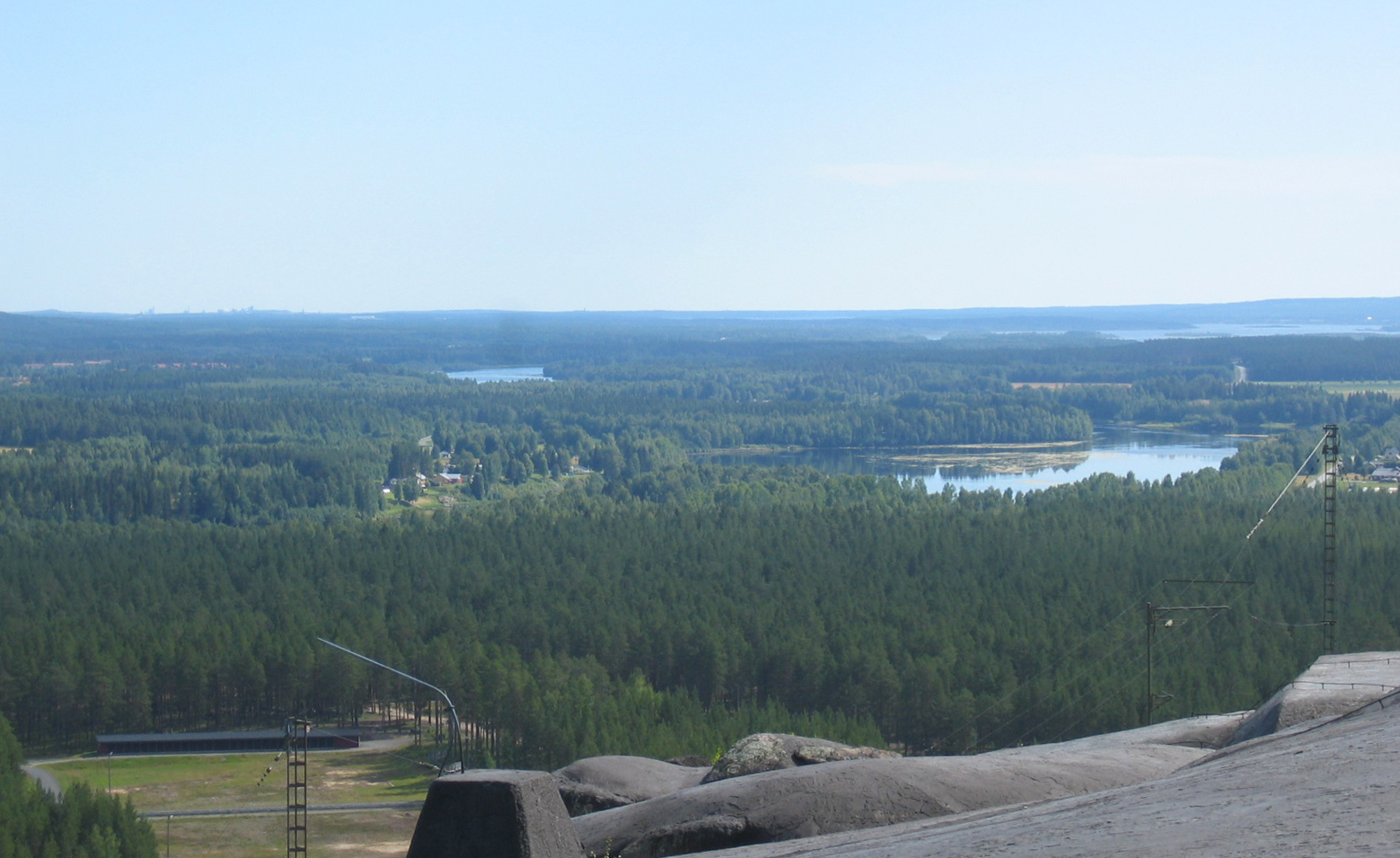
Looking southwest from Rödberget Fort, silhouettes of the SSAB steelworks and other industries in Luleå some 30 km (19 mi) away can be seen.

Due to the strict security surrounding the garrison, many rumours circulated during the fortress' lifetime. Some were later dismissed as myths or as disinformation, but others were confirmed. One common rumour was that the artillery of the main forts had a range of fire that made it possible to shoot at the important Luleå harbour more than 40 kilometres (25 mi) away, but in reality, the maximum range of the farthest shooting pieces was less than half of that. Another widespread myth was that all the forts were connected to each other with a complex system of tunnels beneath the city. However, one has been confirmed, that the forts were used as storage for a large part of the Swedish gold reserve. Around a third of the total Swedish gold holdings of 280 tonnes (9,000,000 ozt) was kept in Degerberget Fort from 1941—transported there disguised as boxes of ammunition—until the last ingots were brought from the fort by six armoured cars in 1982 as the fort no longer was to have around-the-clock surveillance.

The total construction cost of Boden Fortress—somewhere around 20 million kronor at the time—would correspond to almost 1 billion kronor (as of 2011) according to the consumer price index which the government agency Statistics Sweden uses. Despite this, the cost has been claimed to correspond to 4 billion kronor of today, and it has also been claimed that the project was more expensive than the JAS 39 Gripen project, which cost 106 billion kronor in total, each aircraft costing between 300 and 500 million kronor depending on what to include in the calculation. No matter what the actual cost was, opinions on Boden Fortress differ markedly, from being called a boastful project and the "JAS project of the turn of the century" to one of the reasons that kept Sweden out of two World Wars. The fortress also had a psychological aspect, in that its mere existence kept a firm grip of peoples' minds—essentially functioning as a morale booster—during times when Sweden was in the shadow of war.

== Forts ==
=== Degerberget ===
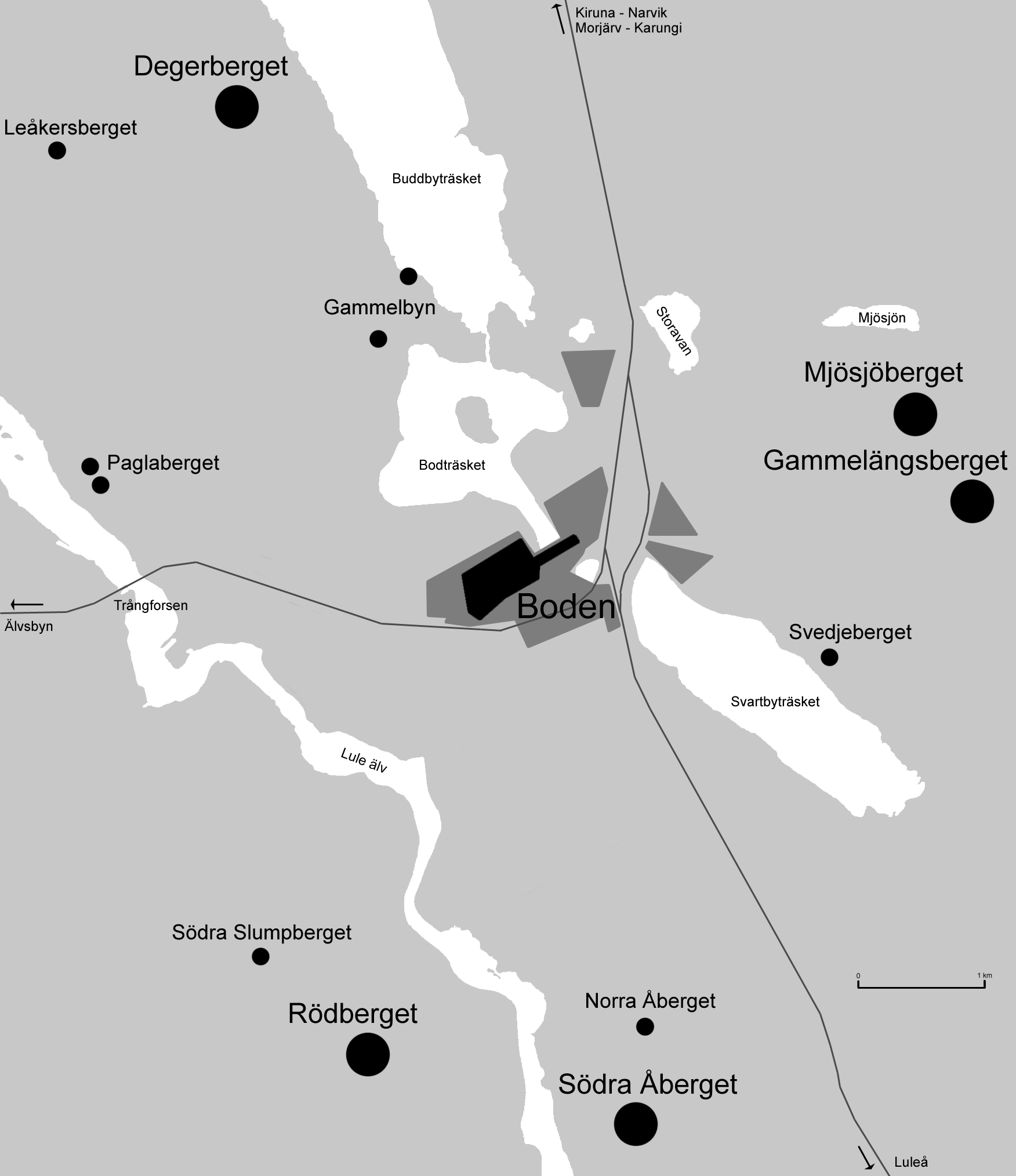
Map of the location of the individual fortifications and batteries, railroad lines, and the size of Boden in 1901 (black) and 1940 (dark grey). (Larger version)

Degerberget Fort (Degerbergsfortet) was planned and constructed on Degerberget Mountain, north of Boden and west of the lake Buddbyträsket, between 1900 and 1908. It was the only fort in the northern fort group as defined in the 1914 defensive plans for Boden Fortress. The main artillery consisted of four 12 cm (4.7 in) kanon m/99, backed up by another four 8.4 cm (3.3 in) kanon m/94-04 which were replaced by 8.4 cm kanon m/47 in the early 1950s. Surrounded by a caponier ditch on all sides, the fort area also features one observation post, two searchlight sites and two larger bunkers. Part of the Swedish gold reserve was kept here from 1941 to 1982. Degerberget Fort was decommissioned in 1992 together with Gammelängsberget Fort.

=== Mjösjöberget ===
Mjösjöberget Fort (Mjösjöfortet) was planned and constructed between 1900 and 1908. A part of the eastern fort group together with Gammelängsberget Fort, it was situated on Mjösjöberget Mountain to the east of Boden. As Rödberget Fort it was fitted with the 15 cm (5.9 in) fästningshaubits m/06 as main artillery, together with the standard secondary 8.4 cm cannon and tertiary 57 mm (2.2 in) caponier cannon. Since Rödberget Fort was refitted with new main artillery in the 1970s, Mjösjöberget Fort is the only to still feature 15 cm main artillery as it was decommissioned in 1979, some 20 years earlier than the other forts. Like the other two forts northeast of Boden, it is surrounded on all sides by a ditch. The fort also has a large bunker and two searchlight sites close by.

=== Gammelängsberget ===
Planned and constructed between 1900 and 1908, Gammelängsberget Fort (Gammelängsfortet) situated on Gammelängsberget Mountain east of Boden was the first of the five forts to be finished and the first to fire any guns when a test firing was conducted in 1907. It was part of the eastern fort group—together with the close by Mjösjöberget Fort—in the 1914 defensive plans. Just as on the other forts, the original secondary guns, 8.4 cm kanon m/94-04, were replaced by 8.4 cm kanon m/47 between 1950 and 1952. The main artillery, 12 cm kanon m/99, and the caponier artillery, 57 mm kaponjärkanon m/07, served with the fort until it was closed down in 1992. Gammelängsberget Fort is surrounded by a caponier ditch on all sides, and a large concrete bunker is located in proximity of the fort.

=== Södra Åberget ===
Forts and selected batteries in 1928 (Note: All forts had the 8.4 cm, 12 cm and 15 cm artillery pieces in armoured turrets. Kartaschew 2000, pp. 4–6.)
| Fortification | Artillery | Arty crew | Inf crew |
|---|---|---|---|
| Degerberget Fort | 4×12 cm (4.7 in) kan m/99 4×8.4 cm (3.3 in) kan m/94-04 8×57 mm (2.2 in) kapkan m/95 | 251 men | 161 men |
| Mjösjöberget Fort | 4×15 cm (5.9 in) fsthaub m/06 4×8.4 cm kan m/94-04 8×57 mm kapkan m/07 | 233 men | 161 men |
| Gammelängsberget Fort | 4×12 cm kan m/99 4×8.4 cm kan m/94-04 8×57 mm kapkan m/07 | 255 men | 161 men |
| Södra Åberget Fort | 4×12 cm kan m/99 4×8.4 cm kan m/94-04 4×57 mm kapkan m/07 | 242 men | 161 men |
| Rödberget Fort | 4×15 cm fsthaub m/06 4×8.4 cm kan m/94-04 8×57 mm kapkan m/07 | 250 men | 161 men |
| Leåkersberget Battery | 10×8.4 cm kan m/94 | 66 men | 161 men |
| Norra Åberget Battery | 4×8.4 cm kan m/94 | 27 men | 0 men |
| Svedjeberget Battery | 4×8.4 cm kan m/94 | 25 men | 0 men |

The only fort not to feature four distinct sides, Södra Åberget Fort (Södra Åbergsfortet) instead features the triangular design that was originally planned for all the forts, and the southwestern side is formed by the mountain scarp rather than a caponier ditch. The fort—planned and constructed on Södra Åberget Mountain south of Boden between 1902 and 1908—was together with Rödberget Fort part of the southern fort group. Södra Åberget Fort had the standard armament in the form of 12 cm kanon m/99, 8.4 cm kanon m/94-04 and 57 mm kaponjärkanon m/07. The 8.4 cm artillery was modernised between 1950 and 1952. Just like the neighbour Rödberget Fort on the other side of Lule River, Södra Åberget Fort has four bunkers, two observation posts and two searchlight sites in its surroundings.

=== Rödberget ===
Perhaps the best known of the five forts, Rödberget Fort (Rödbergsfortet), situated on Rödberget Mountain southwest of Boden, was the last in line for construction, which started in 1903. The fort was finished in 1908 and originally featured four 15 cm fästningshaubits m/06 which in 1976 were replaced by four 12 cm kanon m/24 taken from scrapped Swedish Navy destroyers. (Note: Dig Maps 2001 says that the year was 1979. It is also possible that the change of armament was made over a span of years.) At the same time, another two 12 cm cannon were fitted on a newly constructed small satellite fortification to the north of the fort. Rödberget Fort was part of the southern fort group together with Södra Åberget Fort on the other side of Lule River. These two forts—unlike the other forts—do not have a caponier ditch on all sides, as the western side of Rödberget Fort is protected by the natural scarp of the mountain. The surroundings feature four large bunkers, two observation posts and two searchlight sites. Today, Rödberget Fort is the only larger fortification of Boden Fortress that is open to the public.

== Commandants ==
During the first years in existence, the position was simply titled Commandant in Boden (Kommendant i Boden), but from 1928 on, the officer in charge was Commandant in Boden Fortress (Kommendant i Bodens fästning), and later on had additional commands connected to the position:

| Name | From | To | Notes |
Commandant in Boden
| Constantin Fallenius | 1907-01-01 | 1907-06-04 | Acting |
| Constantin Fallenius | 1907-06-05 | 1908-07-31 | Acting for Lars Tingsten |
| Lars Tingsten | 1908-08-01 | 1913-06-04 | |
| Per Bergenzaun | 1913-06-05 | 1918-01-20 | |
| Curt Rappe | 1918-01-21 | 1927-12-31 | |
Commandant in Boden Fortress
| Oscar Nygren | 1928-01-01 | 1930-04-22 | |
| Pontus Reuterswärd | 1930-05-30 | 1933-08-28 | |
| Gustaf Lagerfelt | 1933-08-29 | 1937-09-30 | |
| Folke Högberg | 1937-10-01 | 1940-09-30 | |
| Helmer Bratt | 1940-10-01 | 1942-09-30 | |
| Gustaf Dyrssen | 1942-10-01 | 1944-03-31 | |
| Gustaf Dyrssen | 1944-04-01 | 1945-09-30 | Acting for Ivar Backlund |
| Gustaf Ehrenborg | 1945-10-01 | 1946-03-31 | Acting for Ivar Backlund |
Commandant in Boden Fortress Deputy commander VI. Military Area Commander Boden/Luleå Defence Area
| Sven Erik Allstrin | 1946-04-01 | 1947-03-31 | |
Commandant in Boden Fortress Deputy commander VI. Military Area Commander Boden Defence Area
| Fernando Odenrick | 1947-04-01 | 1951-03-31 | |
| Hilding Kring | 1951-04-01 | 1955-10-31 | |
Commandant in Boden Fortress Commander Boden Defence Area
| Stig Harry Gerlach | 1951-11-01 | 1955-03-31 | |
| Gösta Sahlén | 1955-04-01 | 1958-03-31 | |
| Carl-Gustav Linnell | 1958-04-01 | 1961-09-30 | |
| Seth Andrae | 1961-11-01 | 1963-03-31 | |
| John Alstermark | 1963-04-01 | 1966-09-30 | |
| Gustaf Lodin | 1966-10-01 | 1971-03-31 | |
| Sven Skeppstedt | 1971-04-01 | 1975-06-30 | |
Commandant in Boden Fortress Commander Boden Garrison Commander Boden Artillery Regiment and Defence Area
| Sven Skeppstedt | 1975-07-01 | 1980-03-31 | |
| Reinhold Lahti | 1980-04-01 | 1983-03-31 | |
| Thure Wadenholt | 1983-04-01 | 1992-12-31 | |
| Göran Honkamaa | 1993-01-01 | 1994-06-30 | |
Commandant in Boden Fortress Commander Boden Garrison Commander Boden Defence Area
| Göran Honkamaa | 1994-07-01 | 1998-06-30 | |
Commandant in Boden Fortress Commander Boden Garrison Commander Norrbotten Defence Area
| Göran Honkamaa | 1998-07-01 | 1999-09-30 | |
| Ulf Nordlander | 1999-10-01 | 2000-06-30 | |

== In media ==
Boden Fortress is mentioned in Tage Danielsson's Sagan om Karl-Bertil Jonssons julafton; the story was made into a short film in 1975 and has been shown on Sveriges Television every Christmas Eve since that year. Karl-Bertil Jonsson, the young boy of the story, works extra at the post office where he steals Christmas gifts addressed to rich people and instead gives them to the poor, Robin Hood-style. One of all the gifts he steals is a matchstick picture (tändstickstavla) of the fortress. When telling the intended receiver of the gift, senior administrative officer H. K. Bergdahl, what he had done Bergdahl answers "Thank you, my lad, for saving us from Boden Fortress!"

The fortress also plays a part in Operation Garbo, a three-volume novel written by Harry Winter, a pseudonym for an undisclosed number of people. The techno-thriller novel is about a Soviet invasion of Sweden, and while Boden Fortress is not a main part of the story, one chapter in the first volume briefly mentions Södra Åberget Fort, and two chapters in the second volume are devoted to events at and around the forts, Södra Åberget and Mjösjöberget Forts are mentioned by name while Rödberget Fort is described more in detail.

A 30-minute episode of the Swedish public broadcaster SVT's series Hemliga svenska rum ("Secret Swedish spaces") covered Boden Fortress and its secrets, lesser known facts and myths. The programme brought up the use of Degerberget Fort as storage for the gold reserve and other pieces of information from 100 years of Swedish military history about "one of Sweden's most peculiar and perhaps mightiest constructions".
