= Boden Fortress Radio Bunker =

- Radiobunkern i Boden
- Boden, Norrbotten, Sweden
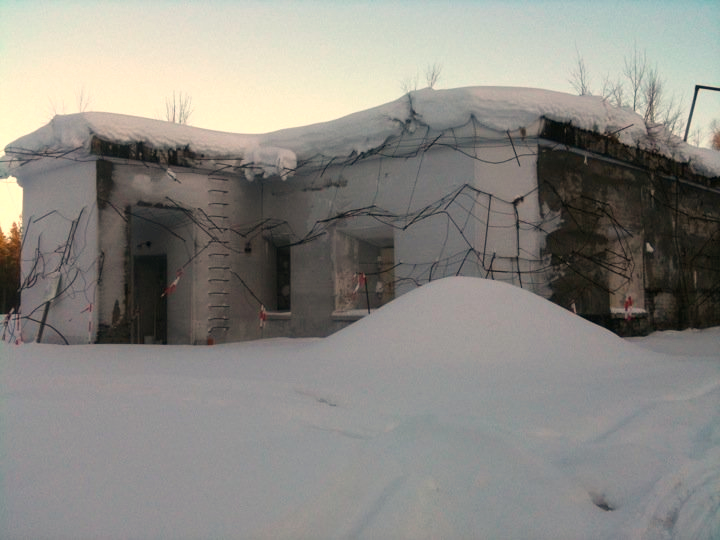
- The Radio Bunker as it appears in 2011

Site information
- Type: Communications bunker
- Owner: Government of Sweden
- Controlled by: Sweden
- Open to the public: No

Location
- Boden shown within Norrbotten County
- Coordinates: 65.8447°N 21.6442°E

Site history
- Built: 1916
- Built by: Government of Sweden
- In use: 1916–1975
- Materials: Concrete, steel

Boden Fortress Radio Bunker (Swedish: Radiobunkern i Boden) is a communications bunker, part of Boden Fortress, outside the city of Boden, Norrbotten, in northern Sweden. It was used for the first radio broadcast in Swedish history.

== History ==
The first radio station at the site was finished by 1914, originally built for the Swedish Navy, and was located south of Degerberget Fort on the "Great Mire" (Stormyren) bog, also known as the "Radio Mire" (Radiomyren). The station was rebuilt as a communications bunker in 1916, a concrete construction with one floor above ground and another below ground, which was supposed to withstand fire from most weapons of that time. The original station was equipped with three 108-metre tall radio masts, while the new bunker had an antenna stretched between two 20-metre masts.

The bunker was first used for radiotelegraphy to keep Boden Fortress in contact with other parts of the country. It also played an important role during the First World War as a medium for exchange of prisoner of war telegrams between the Russian Empire and the Central Powers. Around 7,900 such telegrams were sent during one year. The station was also used for the contact with Sveagruva on Svalbard and for radiotelegraphy with ships in the Gulf of Bothnia.

At 15:00 local time on 12 July 1921, the first radio broadcast in Swedish history was sent from the bunker. Radio commissioner Axel Jenner conducted this historic broadcast, with the Swedish king Gustav V listening some 35 km away in Luleå. Due to a misunderstanding between Jenner and his radio telegrapher, the first words uttered in the broadcast were "jävlar anamma", a Swedish profanity in the style of "damn" or "darn", literally meaning "embrace the devils".

Radiotjänst, the Swedish national radio broadcaster, took control of the broadcasts from the bunker in 1925. The bunker was put out of operation 1 January 1975 and ten years later in 1985, it was decommissioned by the Swedish Army. The bunker has since decayed, but in 2010 a project was initiated to have it declared a historic building.
