= Lars Tingsten =

Swedish Army officer (1857–1937)

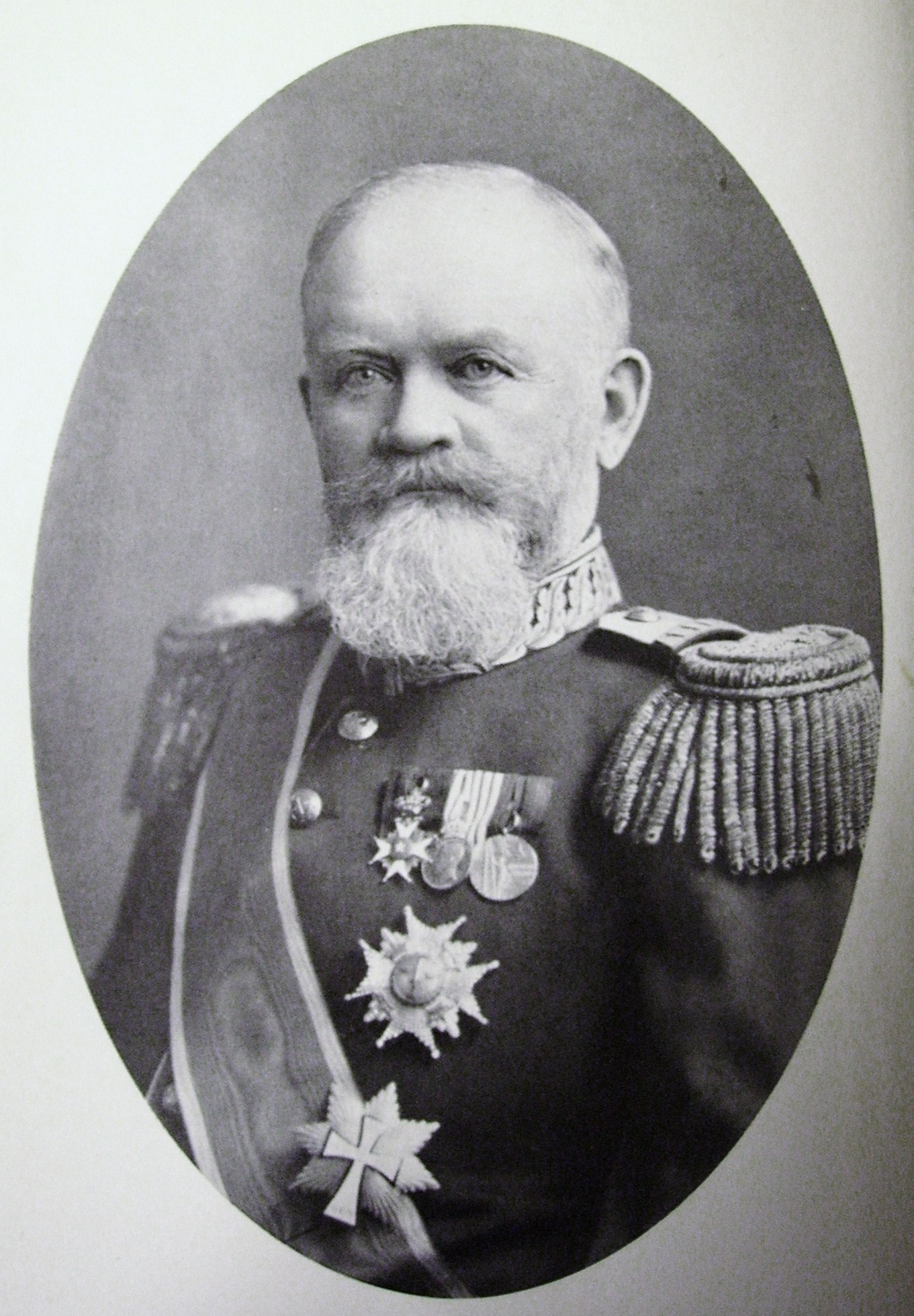
- Born: Lars Herman Tingsten; 13 June 1857; Ingatorp, Sweden
- Died: 10 September 1937 (aged 80); Stockholm, Sweden
- Burial place: Solna cemetery
- Relatives: Herbert Tingsten (nephew)
- Military career
- Allegiance: Sweden
- Branch: Swedish Army
- Service years: 1878–1922
- Rank: General
- Commands: Boden Fortress; 2nd Army Division; Inspector of Infantry; Chief of the General Staff
- Other work: Minister for War (1905–07)

General Lars Herman Tingsten (13 July 1857 – 10 September 1937) was a Swedish Army officer. He was Minister for War from 1905 to 1907 and Chief of the General Staff from 1919 to 1922.

== Early life ==
Tingsten was born on 13 July 1857 in Ingatorp, Sweden, the son of sergeant Lars Magnus Tingsten and his wife Maria Charlotta (née Durling). He was the uncle of Herbert Tingsten. Tingsten passed studentexamen in Uppsala in 1875 and decided soon to pursue a military career, but at a time with petty military prejudices, it was only with great difficulty that the son of a noncommissioned officer son managed to be accepted as a volunteer officer.

== Career ==
Tingsten was commissioned as an officer in Hälsinge Regiment (I 14) in 1878 with then rank second lieutenant. He was promoted to lieutenant in 1884 and he became lieutenant of the General Staff in 1886 and captain of the General Staff in 1891. Tingsten became major of the General Staff in 1897 and lieutenant colonel in 1901 after he served 1898-99 as major in Svea Life Guards (I 1).

Tingsten had advanced within the General Staff where he belonged to the core group, which in the last decades of 1800s, seemed for the army's raise from decay and particularly for the implementation of conscription. Important was his work as a teacher of tactics at the Royal Military Academy in 1884, and well into the 1900s the cadets studied his seminal textbook on the subject. Tingsten was chief of staff of the 5th Army Division in 1895 and captain of Södermanland Regiment (I 10) in 1896.

In the years 1891-1900 he was first teacher at the Royal Swedish Army Staff College and 1900-02 he was head of department at the Military Statistics Department before returning to the Royal Swedish Army Staff College as its head 1902-04. In 1904 he became a colonel and commander of Norrbotten Regiment (I 19). Early on, he was also used in work of defense policy and for this he was hired in the Riksdag committees appointed both in 1892 and 1901 as well as in numerous military committees.

As such, he came in the opportunity to establish relationships with several prominent politicians, which undoubtedly contributed to that he in August 1905 succeeded Otto Virgin as Minister for War and head of the Ministry of Land Defence in Christian Lundeberg's coalition government. At his departure (7 November the same year) Tingsten remained in the same office in Karl Staaff first cabinet. On 16 May 1906 Tingsten filed along with Foreign Minister Eric Trolle his resignation, which is widely considered to be because of dissatisfaction with the speech that Prime Minister Karl Staaff held the previous day in Andra kammaren when dealing with suffrage. The ministerial crisis, which was triggered hereof, obtained on 29 May 1906, that Staff's ministry was replaced with a new one, with the Director General Arvid Lindman as Prime Minister, in which Tingsten came to remain as Minister for War. When Tingsten resigned he was succeeded by Olof Malm. Especially during the first period of Tingsten's time as Minister for War he managed to enforce some partial improvements in the defense system, including the completion of Boden Fortress and its commandant organization.

In 1906 Tingsten was promoted to major general in the army and in 1907 he became commandant in Boden and commandant of Boden Fortress where the spent six years. Tingsten became commander of the 2nd Army Division in 1913 and Inspector of the Infantry in 1915 where he worked tirelessly and successfully for this branch continuous improvement according to the experience of World War I. Thus he acquired in the army's officer corps the honorary title of "General of the Infantry". As Inspector of the Infantry he published Infantry Training Regulations (Infanteriets utbildningsföreskrifter, 1917) and Infantry training in drill (Infanteriets utbildning i exercis, 1918), and he changed or published several instructions regarding the infantry and machine guns. In addition, he wrote a large number of essays in military journals, especially in journal of the Royal Swedish Academy of War Sciences (1884-1924), mainly about infantry organization and tactics. As Chief of the General Staff from 1919, he met a neither easy or rewarding task, due to the postwar general indifference of the Swedish defense.

== Other work ==
Tingsten was a member of the Royal Swedish Academy of War Sciences from 1891. He was a civil law notary in the Committee on Defence in 1892, secretary in the Committee on Defence in 1900, secretary in the Royal Swedish Academy of War Sciences from 1900 to 1903, chairman of the Committee for the reorganization of Field Medical Corps in 1908, member of several military committees, chairman of the Passage System Committee in 1912, chairman of experts to revise the infantry exercise regulations from 1914 to 1915, chairman of experts to draw up instructions for fortified positions in 1917 and chairman in the equipment committee in 1922.

== Later life ==
When Tingsten retired from active duty in 1922, he could, with an energy that wasn't hindered by old age ailments, pursue his extensive war scientific and military history writing. He became an Honorary Doctor of Philosophy at Uppsala University in 1927.

== Personal life ==
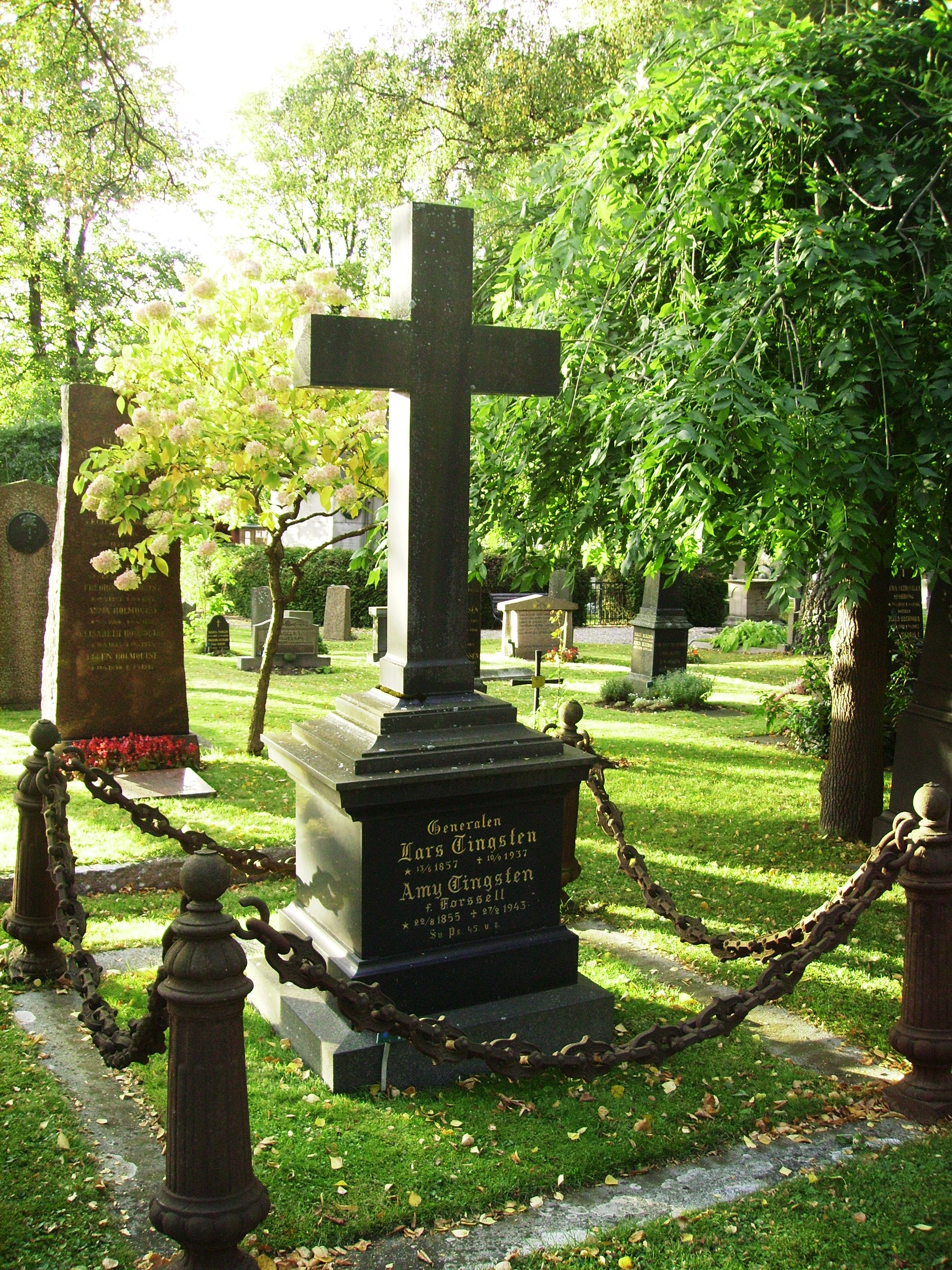
Tingsten's grave at Solna cemetery.

In 1883 he was married Amy Forssell (1855–1943). Tingsten died in 1937 and was buried at Solna cemetery in Solna Municipality near Stockholm.

== Military career overview ==
Tingsten's military career:

- 1878 : second lieutenant of Hälsinge Regiment (I 14)
- 1884 : lieutenant of Hälsinge Regiment (I 14)
- 1886 : lieutenant of the General Staff
- 1886–1892: first teacher at the Royal Military Academy
- 1891 : captain of the General Staff
- 1891–1900: teacher at the Royal Swedish Army Staff College
- 1895–1898: chief of staff of the 5th Army Division
- 1896 : captain of Södermanland Regiment (I 10)
- 1897 : major of the General Staff
- 1898 : major of Svea Life Guards (I 1)
- 1900 : major of the General Staff
- 1900–1902: head of the Military Statistical Department
- 1901 : lieutenant colonel
- 1902–1904: head of the Royal Swedish Army Staff College
- 1903 : colonel in the army
- 1904–1907: colonel and commander of Norrbotten Regiment (I 19)
- 1905–1907: minister and head of the Ministry of Land Defence
- 1906 : major general in the army
- 1907–1913: commandant in Boden
- 1913 : lieutenant general
- 1913–1915: commander of the 2nd Army Division
- 1915–1919: inspector of the Infantry
- 1919–1922: Chief of the General Staff
- 1922 : general at his retirement

== Awards and decorations ==
=== Swedish ===
- (Sweden) Knight and Commander of the Orders of His Majesty the King (Royal Order of the Seraphim) (10 December 1927)
- (Sweden) Commander Grand Cross of the Order of the Sword (6 June 1912)
- (Sweden) Commander 1st Class of the Order of the Sword (1 December 1905)
- (Sweden) Knight 1st CLass of the Order of the Sword (1899)
- (Sweden) Knight of the Order of the Polar Star (1900)

=== Foreign ===
- (Denmark) Grand Cross of the Order of the Dannebrog (between 1910 and 1915)
- (Portugal) Grand Cross of the Military Order of Saint Benedict of Aviz (between 1905 and 1908)
- (Norway) Commander 2nd Class of the Order of St. Olav (before 1905)

Political offices
Preceded by Otto Virgin	Minister for War; 1905–1907	Succeeded by Olof Malm
Military offices
Preceded by None	Boden Fortress; 1907–1913	Succeeded by Axel Bergenzaun
Preceded by Gustaf Uggla	2nd Army Division; 1913–1914	Succeeded by Pehr Hasselrot
Preceded by None	Inspector of the Infantry; 1914–1919	Succeeded by Erik Bergström
Preceded by Knut Gillis Bildt	Chief of the General Staff; 1919–1922	Succeeded by Carl Gustaf Hammarskjöld
