= Vaberget Fortress =

Fort in Västergötland, Sweden

Coordinates: 58.534°N 14.442°E

- Karlsborg, Västergötland, Sweden

Site information
- Type: Fortress
- Controlled by: Sweden

Site history
- Built: 1899–1902
- In use: 1902–1927
- Materials: Concrete, stone, steel
- Battles/wars: None

Garrison information
- Garrison: 220 men

Vaberget Fortress (Swedish: Vabergets fästning) is a fortress located five kilometers west of Karlsborg Fortress, by lake Vättern, in Västergötland, Sweden. The southern fort at Vaberget Fortress was the first fort in the world that fully used the protection provided by the bedrock itself by having all of its functions embedded in the mountain.

== History ==
Construction of nearby Karlsborg Fortress began in 1819 but was not in a defensible state until around 1870 and was not completely finished until 1907. During this time, artillery technology was rapidly evolving, and by 1861 it was realised that the nearby mountain Vaberget could now be used by long range artillery to fire straight into Karlsborg Fortress. It was thus necessary to build a satellite fortress at Vaberget to protect the main fortress. It took nearly 20 years before the first plans were drawn in 1879 and 1883, and funding for the project was granted by the Swedish Riksdag of 1888.

Work started in 1889 at the main fort located on the southern part of the mountain and in 1899 at the smaller fort on the northern part. The whole fortress was blasted into the bedrock, having all functions embedded in the mountain, which was a completely new technique not only in Sweden but in all of Europe. Other European fortresses preceding Vaberget Fortress had been built into mountains, but those were concrete structures placed in excavated mountain shafts, and were not using the bedrock itself as the main structure. The start of construction for Vaberget Fortress preceded the two Swiss forts Fort Bühl and Fort Bäzberg (part of the National Redoubt), also completely embedded in the mountain, by a few months. Another new technique was the use of artillery in turrets on top of the forts that could be rotated 360 degrees, an idea conceived by Belgian fortifications engineer Henri Alexis Brialmont.

The main armament at the southern fort consisted of four 12 cm pieces and eight 6 cm pieces, all in armoured turrets, accompanied by 14 caponier cannon that protected the ditch that surrounded the fort. The northern fort had a main armament six 6 cm pieces in armoured turrets, with eight caponier cannon for close defence. In addition to these two forts, six permanent batteries of four pieces each—either 12 cm cannon or 16 cm howitzers—were constructed on top of the mountain. By 1910, three (of the originally planned six) infantry bunkers (skansar, redoubts) with two 7.5 cm cannon each had been constructed at the foot of the mountain.

The construction of the fortress was completed by 1902, but suffered various problems such as a lack of ventilation, heat sources and power supply. Damp damage due to water leaking in through the mountain—a consequence of blasting with dynamite as well as the bedrock type—led to the condemnation of the southern fort as unhealthy to reside in, in 1912. The problem was not solved until 1944 by the addition of a metal roof, 17 years after the fort had been decommissioned in December 1927, though it was still in use as a storage facility.

Even though Vaberget Fortress came to little use as a fortress, the experiences from the construction were of great use when the much larger Boden Fortress as well as the coastal defence fort Fort Oscar II in Gothenburg were constructed in the early years of the 20th century.
