= Ross Enbom =

Australian rules footballer

Personal information
- Full name: Ross Enbom
- Born: 4 April 1948
- Died: 17 May 2008 (aged 60)
- Original team: Korumburra
- Height: 192 cm (6 ft 4 in)
- Weight: 81 kg (179 lb)

Playing career^{1}
Years	Club	Games (Goals)
1967–68	Fitzroy	7 (0)
- ^{1} Playing statistics correct to the end of 1968.

Ross Enbom (4 April 1948 – 17 May 2008) was a former Australian rules footballer who played with Fitzroy in the Victorian Football League (VFL).
