= Degerberget Fort =

Fort in Sweden

- Degerbergsfortet
- Part of Boden Fortress
- Boden, Norrbotten, Sweden

Site information
- Type: Fort
- Owner: Government of Sweden
- Controlled by: Sweden
- Open to the public: No

Location
- Boden shown within Norrbotten County
- Location within Norrbotten
- Coordinates: 65.8598°N 21.6497°E

Site history
- Built: 1901–1908
- Built by: Government of Sweden
- In use: 1908–1992
- Materials: Concrete, stone, steel
- Battles/wars: None

Garrison information
- Garrison: Around 400 men

Degerberget Fort (Swedish: Degerbergsfortet) is a modern fort, part of Boden Fortress, outside the city of Boden, Norrbotten, in northern Sweden. The fort was finished in 1908 but improvements were also continuously made during, and between, both World Wars. Besides its military role, the fort also served as storage for part of the Swedish gold reserve for over 40 years. Degerberget Fort was decommissioned in 1992.

== Background ==
Boden Fortress was built to act as the operational base for all troops attached for the defence of Norrbotten, and serve as a supply fortress for troops stationed between it and the front line, as well as a blocking fortress in case of a Russian surprise attack.

== Construction ==
Degerberget Fort was planned and constructed on Degerberget Mountain, north of Boden and west of the lake Buddbyträsket, between 1900 and 1908. It was the only fort in the northern fort group as defined in the 1914 defensive plans for Boden Fortress.

== Armament ==
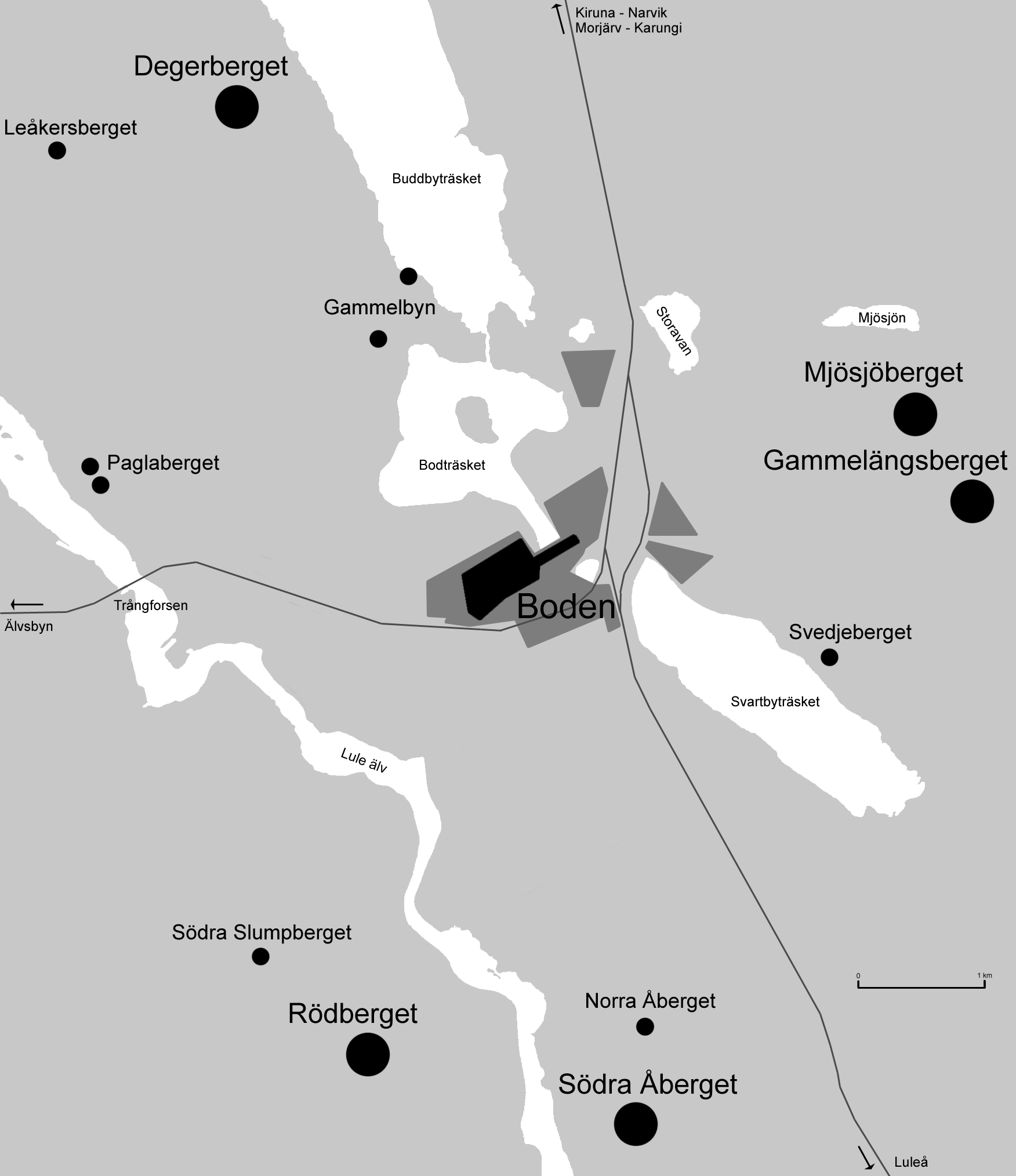
Map of the location of the individual fortifications—with Degerberget Fort in the northwest—and batteries, railroad lines, and the size of Boden in 1901 (black) and 1940 (dark grey). (Larger version)

The main artillery consisted of four 12 cm Kanon m/99, backed up by another four 8.4 cm Kanon m/94-04 which were replaced by 8.4 cm Kanon m/47 in the early 1950s. Surrounded by a caponier ditch on all sides, the fort area also features one observation post, two searchlight sites and two larger bunkers.

== History ==
Part of the Swedish gold reserve was kept here from 1941 to 1982. Degerberget Fort was decommissioned in 1992 together with Gammelängsberget Fort.
