= Fritiof Enbom =

Swedish espionage agent

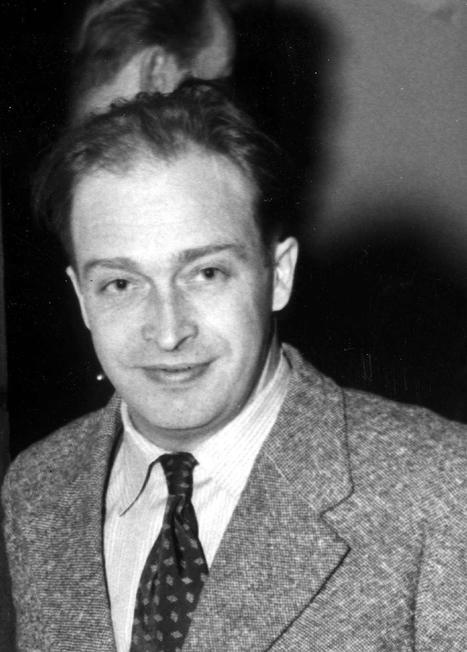
Fritiof Enbom at his trial in 1952

Johan Fritiof Enbom (7 September 1918 – 11 September 1974) was a Swedish railway worker who was accused and convicted of being a spy for the Soviet Union in the 1950s.

Born in Luleå, Enbom was a former worker at the Swedish State Railways in Boden, and later the local editor for the Communist newspaper Norrskensflamman. He was exposed by his own careless talk—often under the influence of alcohol—to the owners of the house in Stockholm where he had lodged since he moved there from Boden.

The family told the Swedish Security Service after the Christmas holidays of 1951, and Enbom was arrested on 16 February 1952. During interrogation, he confessed that he—from February 1943 to April 1951—had met around 25 times with Soviet employers. Enbom had provided a large variety of intelligence, most of it from public sources, but also secrets about armaments in Boden Fortress and nearby fortifications. He was sentenced to lifetime hard labour, but was released after ten years.

Enbom had, according to a police investigation, collected material about the defence locations of northern Sweden. Enbom had then given this information to the Soviet Union. In hindsight it has been proven that most of the information that Enbom gave to the Soviet Union was public and could be easily found by anyone interested. Enbom also said that he was the last chain in a large chain of Soviet spies who gave secret information. Most investigators that view the case today have concluded that Enbom largely lied or made up most of his stories about his spying or at least his role in the spying on Sweden for the Soviet Union. Lund University professor Wilhelm Agrell, on the other hand, has concluded that Enbom provided KGB agent Vladimir Petrov with a lot of secret information from Sweden about its defence. Enbom died in 1974 in Stockholm.
