= Sawfiler =

Skilled trade in the lumber and sawmill industries

A saw filer (or saw doctor in Australasia) is a skilled tradesperson within the broader field of the saw trades, which involves the maintenance, repair, and precision setup of industrial saw blades used in sawmills and wood processing operations. These saws include bandsaws, circular saws, gang saws, and chipper knives. Sawfilers play a critical role in maximizing wood recovery, ensuring safety, and maintaining product quality in modern lumber manufacturing.

The saw filer's primary work area is called the filing room or saw shop. Key responsibilities include inspecting saws, sharpening teeth, shaping gullets, setting kerf, welding cracks, and benching blades—applying tension and level to counteract operational stress.

== History and training ==
The saw trades have existed for centuries, evolving alongside the timber industry. The role of the saw filer has transitioned from manual hand-filing to a high-precision trade incorporating metallurgy, welding, diagnostics, and computer-controlled machinery. With the increasing automation of sawmill processes, saw filers also work with CNC equipment, tensioning systems, and automated grinders.

In 2022, Reliability Solutions, through Sawfiler.org, launched the first and only U.S. Department of Labor-registered saw filer apprenticeship program in the United States. This initiative was created to address the shortage of skilled tradespeople in the industry and provides structured training in both traditional methods and advanced technologies.

In Canada, the province of British Columbia offers a formal apprenticeship and certification framework under the Industry Training Authority (ITA) through its Saw Trades Program. Apprentices progress through levels such as Saw Fitter, Saw Filer, and Benchperson, with each requiring on-the-job hours and in-school training.

== Responsibilities ==
Key duties of a saw filer include:

- Filing – Sharpening and shaping saw teeth using grinding machines.
- Fitting – Swaging, shaping, and gauging tips to achieve precise kerf tolerances.
- Benching – Leveling and tensioning blades using hammers and stretcher-rolls.
- Repair – Welding cracked blades, replacing broken teeth, and applying stellite or carbide tips.
- Troubleshooting – Diagnosing sawing defects like vibration, lead, heat distortion, or poor finish.

== Bandsaw filing ==
Bandsaws in timber mills can range from (4" x 22ga x 10') to (16" x 11ga x 62'). Common types include:

- Single-cut saws – Teeth on one side for cutting in one direction.
- Double-cut saws – Teeth on both sides for bidirectional cutting.
- Sliver tooth saws – Feature teeth with different profiles on each side for de-burring and smoother finishes.

Key bandsaw tasks include:

- Gumming – Grinding gullets to specific profiles to reduce stress and material fatigue.
- Fitting – Swaging the tips, then shaping to achieve uniform kerf (typically ±.005").
- Benching – Tensioning saws to counteract cutting and thermal forces using stretchers and hammers.
- Welding and repair – Fixing cracks, broken teeth, or applying new tooth tips.

Gullet geometry is tailored to species and machine specs, e.g., 1–3/4" pitch, 3/4" gullet depth, 30° face angle, and 16° back angle.

== Circular saw benching ==
Circular saw maintenance shares many principles with bandsaw filing. Key distinctions:

- Leveling tools – Hammers such as doghead, twist face, and cross face are used with anvils.
- Anvils – Dead anvils for leveling and live anvils for tensioning.
- Tooth types – Solid, set teeth, or stellite/carbide/insert-tipped. Swaging is usually not needed for tipped saws.

Circular saws may also be tensioned using stretcher-roller machines. Fatigue cracking in the gullet is less frequent than in band saws due to geometry and support.

== Automation ==
Modern saw shops incorporate CNC grinders, programmable benching stations, and auto-tensioners. While some tasks like gumming and fitting are partially automated, experienced sawfilers are still vital for diagnosing cutting issues, troubleshooting lumber defects, and handling complex repairs.

== The saw trades ==
The term saw trades refers to a group of interconnected skilled roles—saw fitters, filers, benchpersons, and sometimes millwrights—who maintain and prepare saws for industrial wood cutting. The trade includes mechanical, metallurgical, and diagnostic skills and is essential to the timber processing industry. Formal training is offered in regions like British Columbia and the United States, where structured apprenticeship programs help standardize and preserve trade knowledge.

== Global terminology ==
In different regions, naming conventions for saw trades vary:

- North America: “Sawfiler” is widely used and may include both filing and benching duties.
- Australia and New Zealand: The equivalent role is known as “saw doctor,” and workspaces are called “saw shops.”

In the Pacific Northwest and Australasia, most mills use stellite-tipped bandsaws, reducing the need for traditional swaging and shaping. However, gumming, tensioning, and troubleshooting remain critical.

== See also ==
- Bandsaw
- Circular saw
- Sawmill
- Portable sawmill
- Stellite
