= Herbert Tingsten =

Swedish political scientist, writer and publisher (1896–1973)

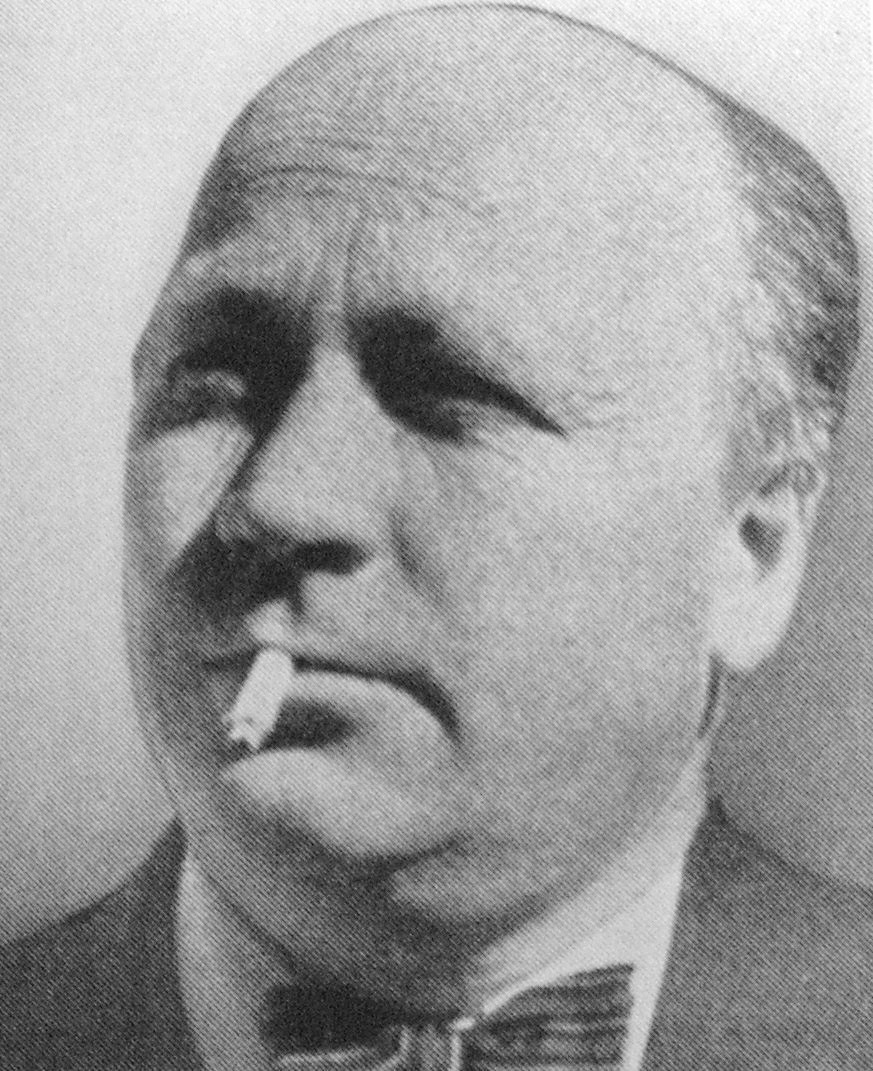
- Herbert Tingsten in 1952
- Born: Herbert Lars Gustaf Tingsten; 17 March 1896; Järfälla, Sweden
- Died: 26 December 1973 (aged 77); Stockholm, Sweden
- Occupations: Political scientist, writer, newspaper publisher

Herbert Lars Gustaf Tingsten (17 March 1896 – 26 December 1973) was a Swedish political scientist, writer and newspaper publisher. An influential figure in Swedish political science, he was a professor of political science at Stockholm University from 1935 to 1946, and executive editor of the newspaper Dagens Nyheter from 1946 to 1959.

== Career ==
Herbert Tingsten was born in Järfälla, Stockholm County, the son of city servant Karl Tingsten and his wife Elin Bergenstjerna. He finished his doctoral thesis in 1923 while working as secretary in the Swedish parliament's Committee on the Constitution. As a political scientist his main fields included constitutional history, constitutional law and the history of ideas.

Tingsten changed his political views several times during his life. In his early youth he was a conservative and later a radical left-wing liberal. During the 1920s he joined the Swedish Social Democratic Party and was on the left-wing faction of the party. In 1941 he wrote Den svenska socialdemokratiens idéutveckling ("The Development of the Idea of Swedish Social Democracy"). However, after reading Friedrich Hayek's The Road to Serfdom in 1944, Tingsten became a convinced believer in a free market economy and in 1945 he left the Social Democratic Party.

He was one of the original participators of the Mont Pelerin Society, founded in 1947.

Tingsten was an early opponent of Nazism, which he warned against during the early 1930s, as well as of the threat of Communism. During his time as executive editor of Dagens Nyheter, Tingsten argued for Swedish membership in NATO. He also supported Israel.

In a number of books and publications, Tingsten anticipated some of the major issues in the political developments of the 20th century, such as the rise of fascism, apartheid in South Africa, the transition of socialism into social democracy as well as the need for democratic vitality in Western societies. Tingsten had a deep erudition in both Anglophone and Continental European science and literature. He created the concept of political behaviour in his 1936 book, pioneering the analysis of election statistics.

== Published works ==
Note: The following list includes original editions only, not later published or translated editions.

- Folkomröstningsinstitutet i Nordamerikas Förenta Stater (in Swedish). Stockholm. 1923. [The referendum institution in United States of North America (sic)]
- Konstitutionella fullmaktslagar i modern parlamentaris (in Swedish). Lund: Gleerup. 1926. [Constitutional warrant laws in modern parliaments]
- Förbudslagstiftningens resultat i Nordamerikas förenta stater (in Swedish). Stockholm. 1927.[Prohibition law results in the United States of North America (sic)]
- Studier över konstitutionsutskottets dechargeförfarande : några spörsmål i anknytning till senare praxis (in Swedish). Uppsala. 1928. [Studies over the constitutional committee's decharge procedure : some questions in connection to later praxis]
- Amerikansk demokrati : grunddragen av Förenta staternas statsliv (in Swedish). Stockholm: Natur & Kultur. 1929. [American democracy : constitution of the United States State-life]
- Studier rörande ministerstyrelse (in Swedish). Stockholm. 1929. [Studies regarding ministerial governance]
- Regeringsmaktens expansion under och efter världskriget : studier över konstitutionell fullmaktslagstiftning (in Swedish). Lund: Gleerup. 1930. [The governmental expansion during and after the world war : studies on constitutional warrant laws]
- Från parlamentarism till diktatur : fascismens erövring av Italien (in Swedish). Stockholm: Natur & kultur. 1930. [From parliamentarism to dictatorship : The fascist conquest of Italy]
- Utredning angående införande av ett dagordningsinstitut m. m. (in Swedish). Stockholm: Nord. bokh. i distr. 1935. [Investigation regarding the introduction of an agenda institute among other things ]
- Den nationella diktaturen : nazismens och fascismens idéer (in Swedish). Stockholm: Bonnier. 1936. [The national dictatorship : The nazi and fascist ideas]
- Political behavior : studies in election statistics. London: P.S. King. 1937.
- De konservativa idéerna (in Swedish). Stockholm: Bonnier. 1939. [The conservative ideas]
- Den svenska socialdemokratiens idéutveckling (in Swedish). Stockholm: Tiden. 1941. [The Development of the Idea of Swedish Social Democracy]
- Idékritik (in Swedish). Stockholm: Bonnier. 1941. [Idea critique]
- Problem i svensk demokrati (in Swedish). Stockholm. 1941. [Problems in Swedish democracy]
- Samtidens förbundsstater (in Swedish). Stockholm: Kooperativa förbundet. 1942. [Current federation states]
- Debatten om nordisk enhet (in Swedish). Stockholm. 1943. [Debate regarding Nordic unity]
- Svensk utrikesdebatt mellan världskrigen (in Swedish). Stockholm: Kooperativa förbundet. 1944. [Swedish foreign policy debate between the world wars]
- Engelsk kolonialdebatt (in Swedish). Stockholm. 1944. [English colonial debate]
- Fred och säkerhet efter andra världskriget : ett svenskt diskussionsinlägg (in Swedish). Stockholm: Kooperativa förbundet. 1945. [Peace and security after the second world war : a Swedish discussion post]
- Demokratiens problem (in Swedish). Stockholm: Norstedt. 1945. [Democracy's problem]
- Problem i U.S.A. (in Swedish). Stockholm: Bonnier. 1948. [Problems in the USA]
- Argument (in Swedish). Stockholm: Bonnier. 1948. [Argument]
- Revolutionernas arvtagare : sydamerikanskt perspektiv (in Swedish). Stockholm: Bonnier. 1950. [The Revolution's inheritors : South American perspective]
- Västtysklands problem (in Swedish). Stockholm: Bonnier. 1950. [Problems in West Germany]
- Tredje ståndpunkten - en orimlighet (in Swedish). Stockholm: Bonnier. 1951.
- Idéer och genier (in Swedish). Stockholm: Bonnier. 1953. [Ideas and geniuses]
- Problemet Sydafrika (in Swedish). Stockholm: Bonnier. 1954. [Problems in South Africa]
- Parti och politik (in Swedish). Stockholm: Ehlins. 1955. [Parties and Politics]
- Japan (in Swedish). Stockholm: Bonnier. 1956. [Japan]
- Det hotade Israel (in Swedish). Stockholm: Wahlström & Widstrand. 1957. [The threatened Israel]
- På krigsstigen (in Swedish). Stockholm: Wahlström & Widstrand. 1958. [On the war path]
- På marknadstorget (in Swedish). Stockholm: Wahlström & Widstrand. 1958. [At the market place]
- Åsikter och motiv : [essayer i statsvetenskapliga, politiska och litterära ämnen] (in Swedish). Stockholm: Aldus/Bonnier. 1963. [Opinions and motives]
- Mitt liv (in Swedish). Stockholm: Norstedt. 1961–1964. [My life]
- Skall kungamakten stärkas? : kritik av författningsförslaget (in Swedish). Stockholm: Aldus/Bonnier. 1964. [Should the royal power be strengthened : critique of the constitutional recommendation]
- Viktoria och viktorianerna (in Swedish). Stockholm: Aldus/Bonnier. 1965. [Victoria and the Victorians]
- När Churchill grep makten och andra essayer (in Swedish). Stockholm: Norstedt. 1966. [When Churchill ceased power and other essays]
- Från idéer till idyll : den lyckliga demokratien (in Swedish). Stockholm: Norstedt. 1966. [From idea to idyll : the happy democracy]
- Strid kring idyllen (in Swedish). Stockholm: Norstedt. 1966. [Struggle around the idyll]
- Notiser om liv och död (in Swedish). Stockholm: Norstedt. 1967. [Notices on life and death]
- Dagbok från Amerika (in Swedish). Stockholm: Norstedt. 1968. [Journal from America]
- Min politiska horisont och andra essayer (in Swedish). Stockholm: Norstedt. 1969. [My political horizon and other essays]
- Gud och fosterlandet : studier i hundra års skolpropaganda (in Swedish). Stockholm: Norstedt. 1969. [God and fatherland : studies of a hundred years of school propaganda]
- När skymningen faller på (in Swedish). Stockholm: Norstedt. 1970. [When dusk falls]
- Perspektiv på näringslivsdebatten (in Swedish). Stockholm. 1970. [Perspective on business debate]
- Sällskap för mina tankar (in Swedish). Stockholm: Norstedt. 1971. ISBN 91-1-715742-0. [Companion for my thoughts]
- Flyktförsök : notiser 1971-1972 (in Swedish). Stockholm: Norstedt. 1972. ISBN 91-1-725682-8. [Escape attempt(s?) : notices 1971-1972]
