= Ernst von der Lancken =

Swedish Army officer (1841–1902)

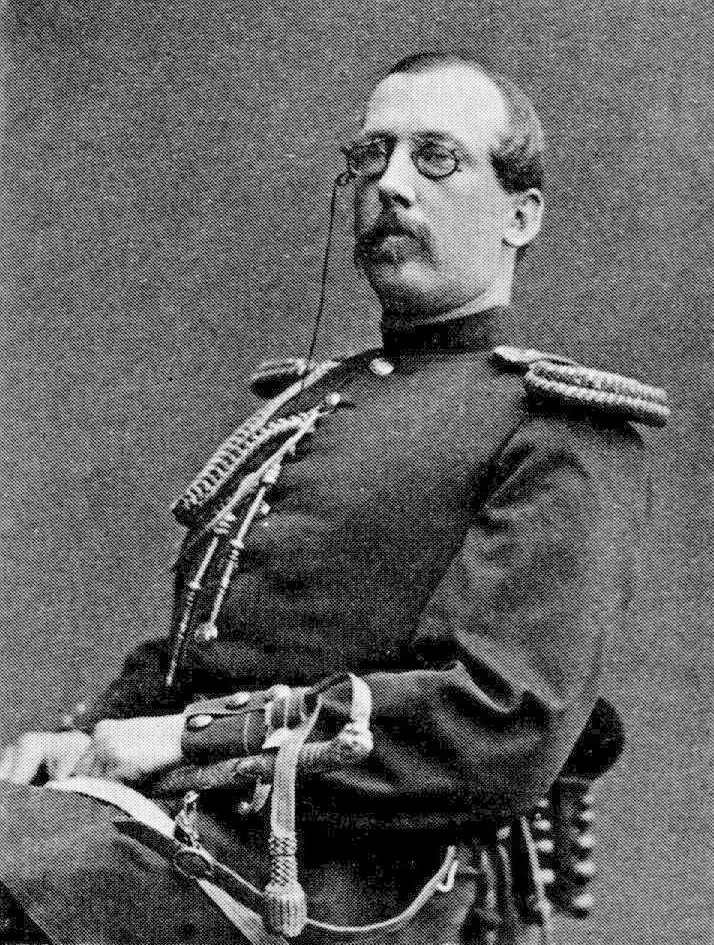
- Born: Ernst Ferdinand von der Lancken; 24 August 1841; Malmö, Sweden
- Died: 18 May 1902 (aged 60); Stockholm, Sweden
- Burial place: Norra begravningsplatsen
- Military career
- Allegiance: Sweden
- Branch: Swedish Army
- Service years: 1860–1895
- Rank: Major General
- Commands: Swedish Army Service Troops; Acting Chief of the General Staff

Major General Ernst Ferdinand von der Lancken (24 August 1841 – 18 May 1902) was a Swedish Army officer. His senior commands includes the post as Inspector of the Swedish Army Service Troops (1889–1892) and Acting Chief of the General Staff (1892–1895).

== Early life ==
von der Lancken was born on 24 August 1841 in Malmö, Sweden, the son of lieutenant colonel Gustaf Ferdinand von der Lancken and his wife Katarina Benedikta (née Wulff). He was the brother of Deputy Governor of Stockholm (Underståthållare), Ehrenfried von der Lancken (1843–1919). He passed studentexamen in Lund in 1858 and graduated with an administrative degree (kansliexamen) in 1864.

== Career ==
von der Lancken was commissioned into the South Scanian Infantry Regiment with the rank of underlöjtnant in 1860. He became a General Staff officer in 1866 and was promoted to lieutenant in the South Scanian Infantry Regiment in 1870. von der Lancken became captain in the General Staff in 1873 and in the South Scanian Infantry Regiment in 1878. He served as teacher of general staff service at the Royal Swedish Army Staff College from 1878 to 1884 and as chief of staff of the 4th Military District from 1879 to 1881.

von der Lancken was promoted to major in the Älvsborg Regiment in 1881, and became a lieutenant colonel there in 1884 and in the General Staff the same year. He then served as head of the Statistical Department of the General Staff from 1884 to 1892 and as Inspector of the Swedish Army Service Troops from 1889 to 1892. von der Lancken was promoted to colonel in the Swedish Army in 1891 and in the General Staff in 1892. He then served as Acting Chief of the General Staff from 1892 to 1895. von der Lancken was promoted to major general in the army in 1894. As Acting Chief of the General Staff, von der Lancken drafted the proposal for improved army order, which, with few modifications, was adopted by the 1892 Riksdag and was adopted by the King in Council.

He was also the driving force of the 1881—83 Service Regulations Committee. He wrote a large number of annual reports, biographies, essays and - generally very sharp - criticisms in Krigsvetenskapsakademiens handlingar och tidskrift, and also translated and provided comments to the Russian military author Genrich Leer's work Positive Strategy (1874).

== Personal life ==
von der Lancken never married. It said "Faithful and noble" in his obituary, signed by the deceased's brother, Ehrenfried von der Lancken.

== Death ==
He died on 18 May 1902 in Hedvig Eleonora Parish in Stockholm. He was buried at Norra begravningsplatsen in Stockholm.

== Dates of rank ==
- 1858 – Furir
- 1860 – Underlöjtnant
- 1866 – Lieutenant
- 1870 – Second lieutenant
- 1873 – First lieutenant
- 1873 – Captain
- 1881 – Major
- 1884 – Lieutenant colonel
- 1890 – Colonel
- 1896 – Major general

== Awards and decorations ==
- (Sweden) Commander 1st Class of the Order of the Sword
- (Sweden) Knight of the Order of the Polar Star
- (Norway) Knight of the Order of St. Olav

== Honours ==
- Member of the Royal Swedish Academy of War Sciences (1875)

Military offices
Preceded by Emil Adolf Malmborg	Inspector of the Swedish Army Service Troops; 1889–1892	Succeeded by Gustaf Anton Bråkenhielm
Preceded by Axel Rappe	Acting Chief of the General Staff; 1892–1895	Succeeded by Carl Warberg as Acting Chief of the General Staff
