= General Peyron =

General Peyron may refer to:

- Gustaf Oscar Peyron (1828–1915), Swedish Army lieutenant general
- Henry Peyron (1883–1972), Swedish Army major general
- Lennart Peyron (1909–1981), Swedish Air Force major general
