= General (Sweden) =

Swedish military rank

General General
- Rank flag

- Rank insignia of the Army, Amphibious Corps & Air force
- Country: Sweden
- Service branch: Army; Air Force; Amphibious Corps (from 2000); Coastal Artillery (until 2000)
- Abbreviation: Gen (Swedish) (English)
- Rank group: General officer
- Rank: Four-star (Note: General was a three-star rank until 1972 in the Swedish Armed Forces rank structure.)
- NATO rank code: OF-9
- Non-NATO rank: O-10
- Next higher rank: Field marshal
- Next lower rank: Lieutenant general
- Equivalent ranks: Admiral

General (Gen; Swedish: General) is a four-star commissioned officer rank in the Swedish Army, Swedish Air Force and Swedish Amphibious Corps. General ranks immediately above lieutenant general and is equivalent to admiral in the Swedish Navy. It is held by the Chief of Defence of the Swedish Armed Forces and the monarch.

== History ==
In Sweden, the rank of general was a three-star rank until 1972 when it became a four-star rank. Historically, during the 20th century, lieutenant generals were promoted one grade upon retirement to full general. According to current practice only royals and the chief of defence, if he were to come from the Swedish Army, Swedish Air Force or the Swedish Amphibious Corps can hold the rank of a full, four-star, general in Sweden.

In the King in Council meeting on 30 April 1954, Bengt Nordenskiöld was appointed the first non-royal general in the Swedish Air Force, two months before his retirement. On 1 January 2004, Håkan Syrén became the first, and so far only, general in the Swedish Amphibious Corps (formerly the Coastal Artillery).

In 2009, the Swedish Armed Forces reported that General Håkan Syrén would retain his rank during his time as Chairman of the European Union Military Committee (2009–2012), which for the first time gave Sweden three active four-star generals; former Supreme Commander, General Håkan Syrén (2004–2012), then current Supreme Commander, General Sverker Göranson (2009–2015), and King Carl XVI Gustaf (1973–present). This is correct since the rank of general since 1972 is a four-star rank. However, before 1972, the rank of general was a three-star rank, and between 1940 and 1941 Sweden had five active three-star generals; the Supreme Commander, General Olof Thörnell (1940–1944), General Oscar Nygren (1939–1941 (Note: Nygren left active service and was promoted to general in the army on 1 October 1937. He was recalled to active service to the post of commander of the 2nd Army Corps, where he served in Upper Norrland from December 1939 to April 1940 and in western Sweden from April to September 1940 and April to August 1941. Nygren was at the appointment in 1939 Sweden's only three-star general outside the royal family.)), King Gustaf V (1898–1950), Crown Prince Gustaf Adolf (1932–1973), and Prince Carl, Duke of Västergötland (1908–1951).

Following a proposal from the Swedish Armed Forces, the Government of Sweden decides on employment as a general.

In everyday speech, generals of all ranks are addressed as generals.

== Rank insignia ==
=== Collar patches ===
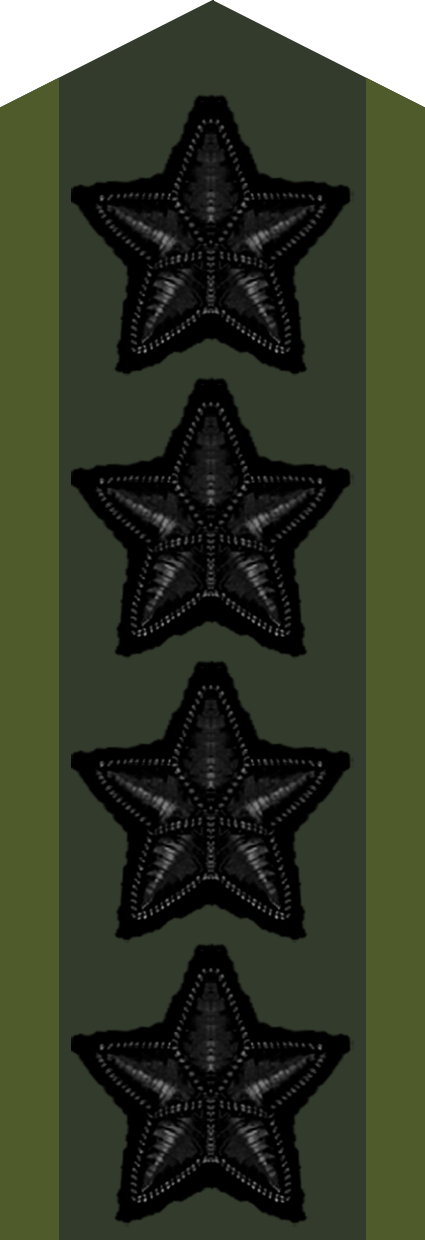
Collar patch m/58 (black m/02) on field uniform M90
(2002–present)

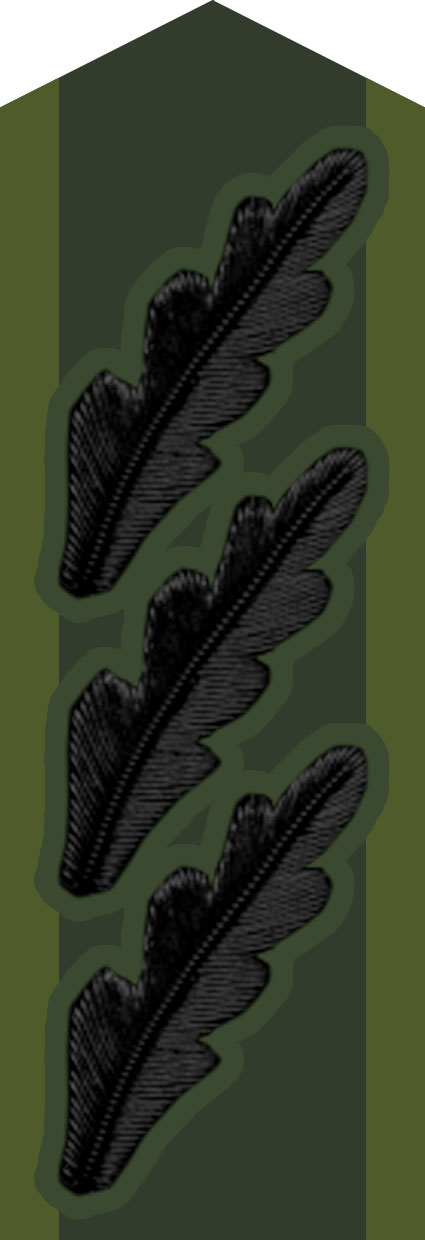
Collar patch m/58 (black m/02) on field uniform M90
(2002–present)

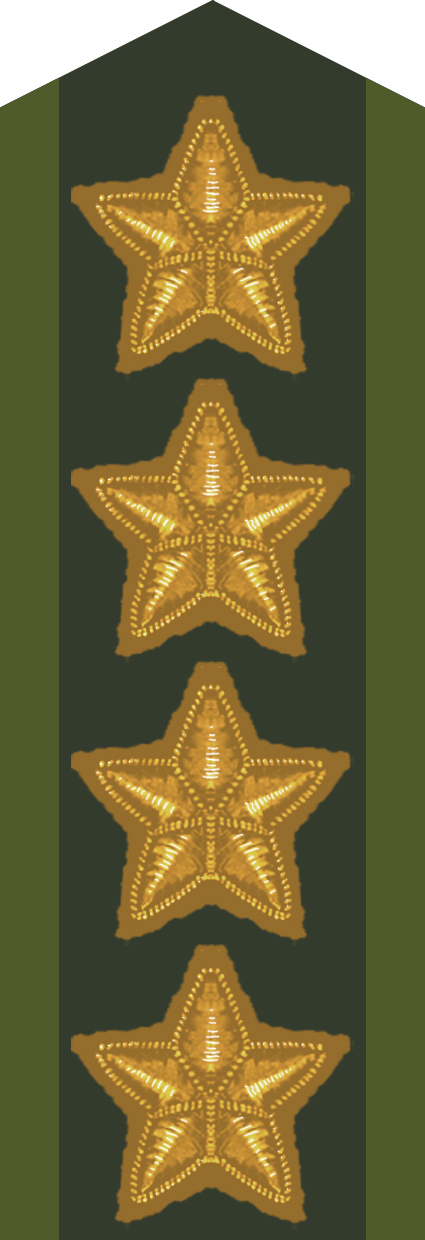
Collar patch m/58 (gold) on uniform m/58-m/59 and field uniform M90
(1983–2002)

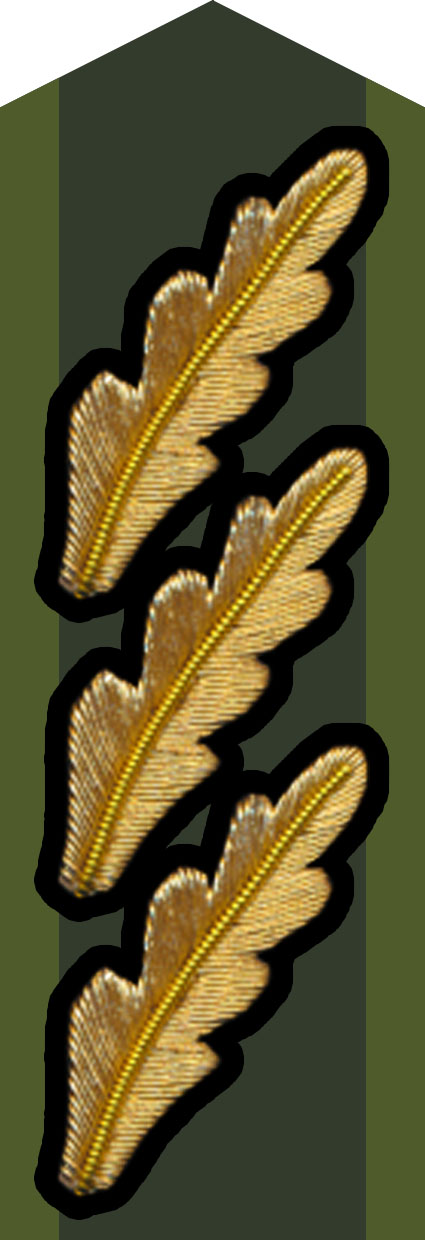
Collar patch m/58 (gold) on uniform m/58-m/59 and field uniform M90
(–2002)

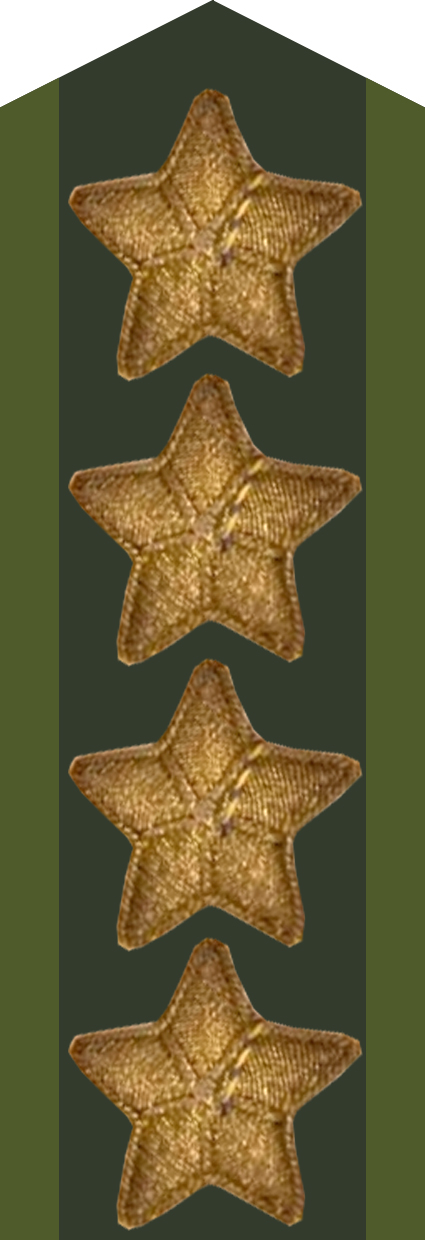
Collar patch m/58 (bronze) on uniform m/58-m/59
(1972–1983)

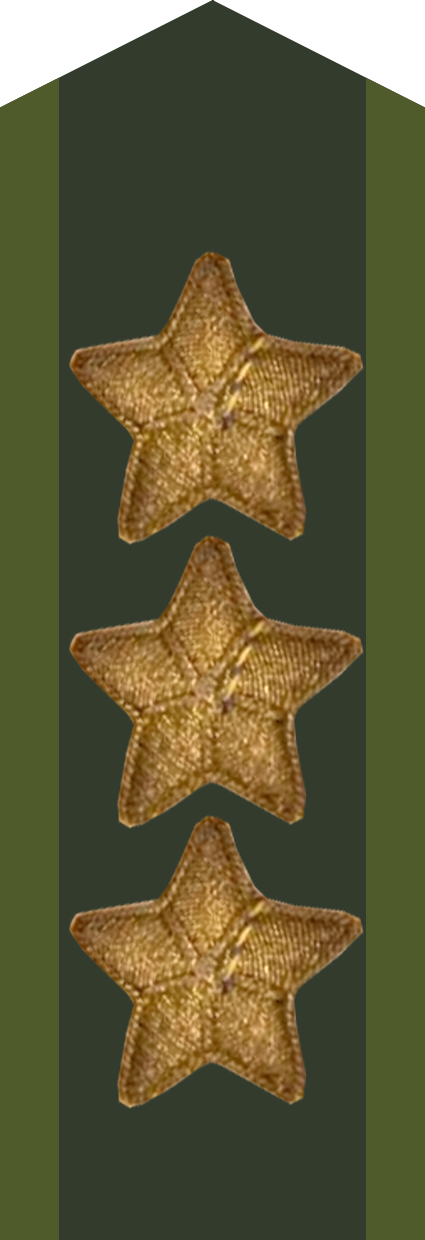
Collar patch m/58 (bronze) on uniform m/58-m/59
(1958–1972)

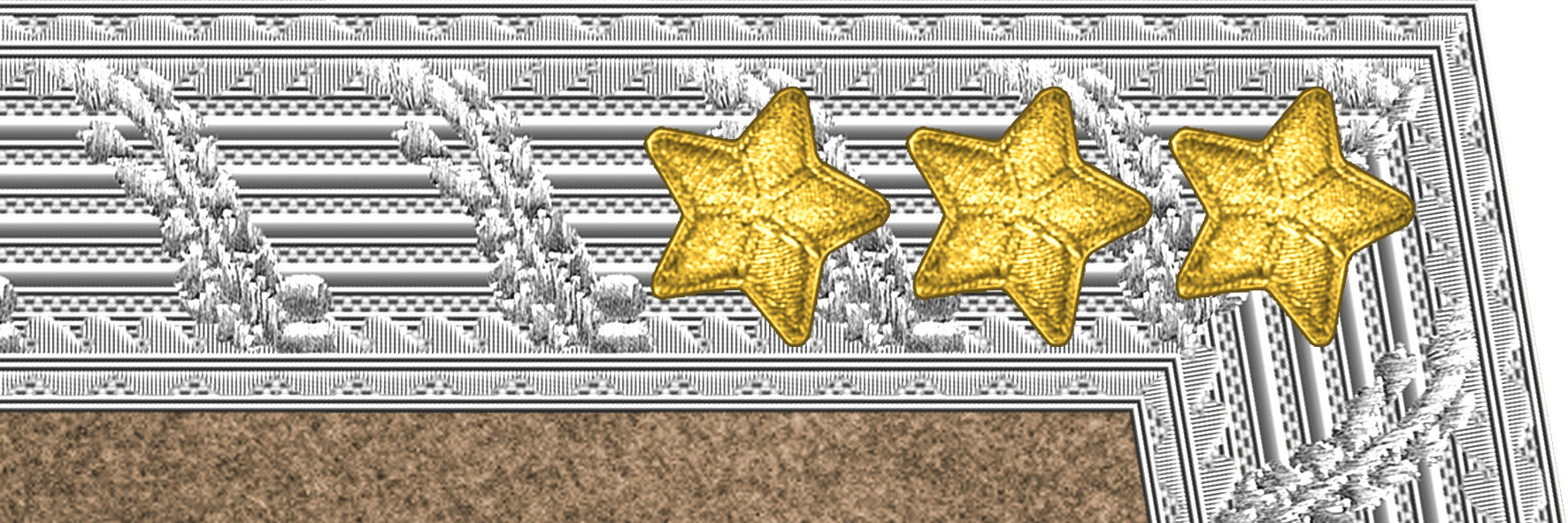
Collar patch on uniform m/1923
(1923–1939)

=== Shoulder marks ===
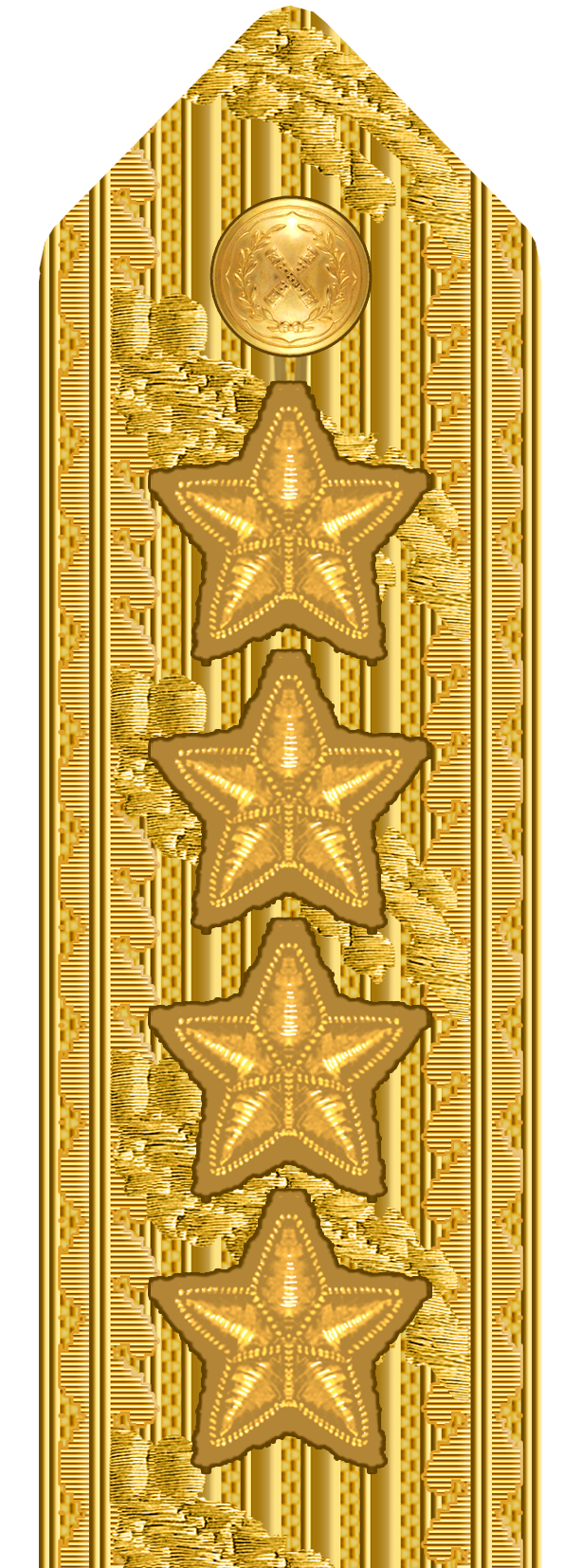
Shoulder mark on uniform m/87 (Army and Air Force)
(1987–present)

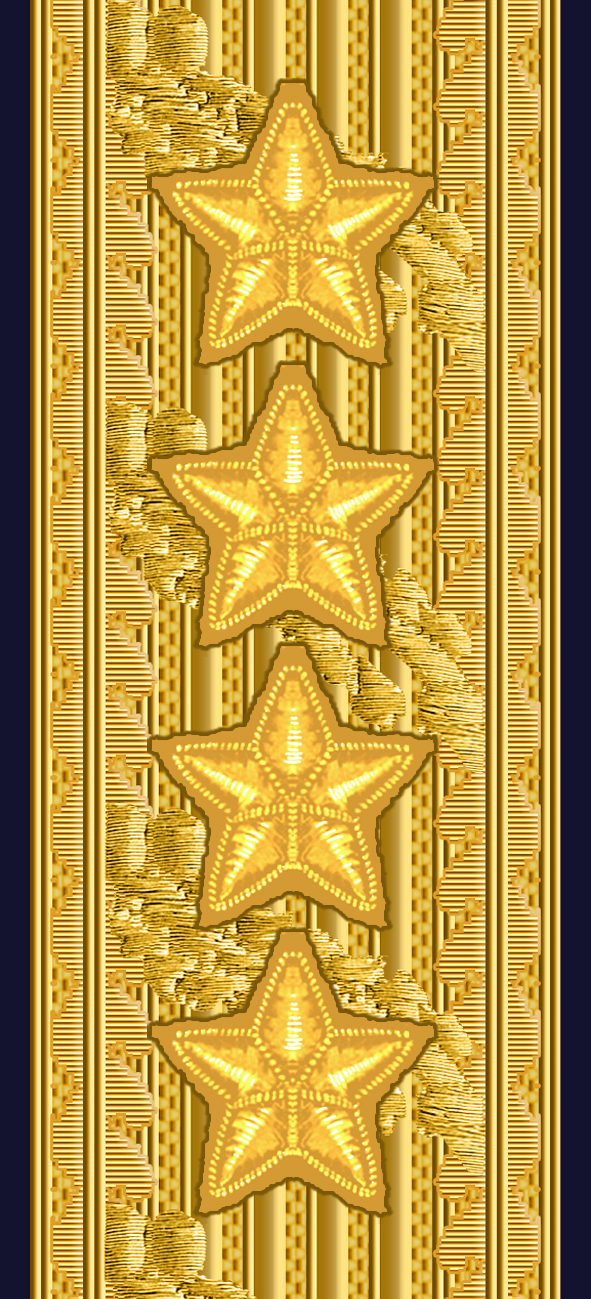
Shoulder mark m/87 on white shirt (Army and Air Force)
(1987–present)

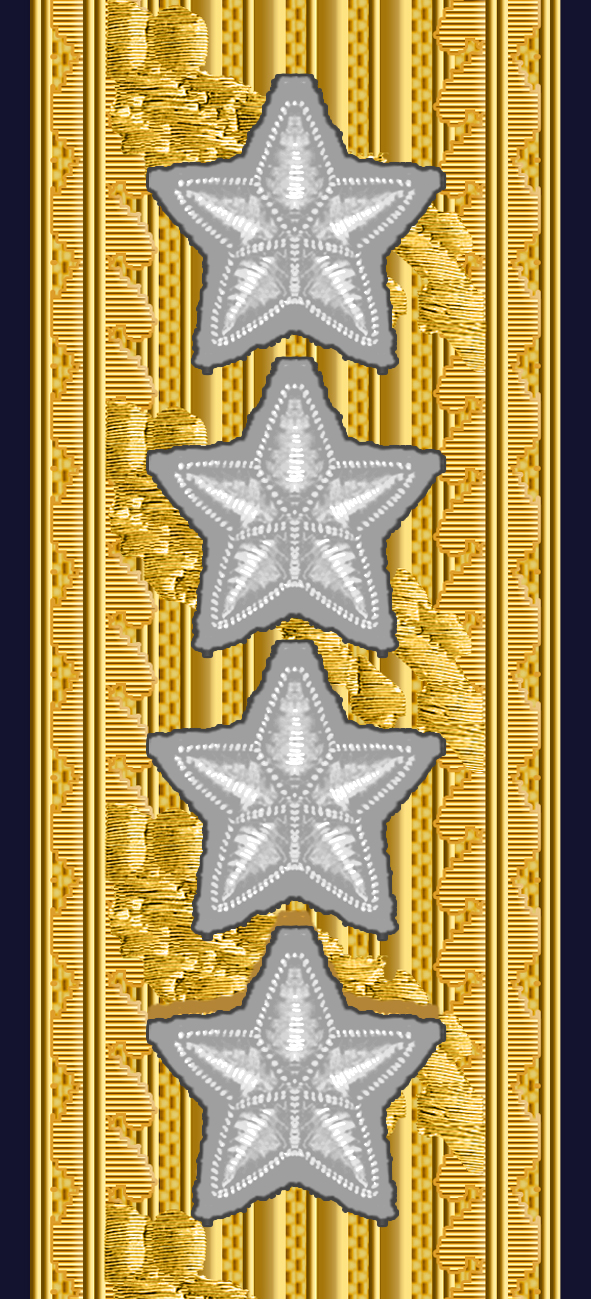
Shoulder mark m/87 on white shirt (Navy)
(1987–present)

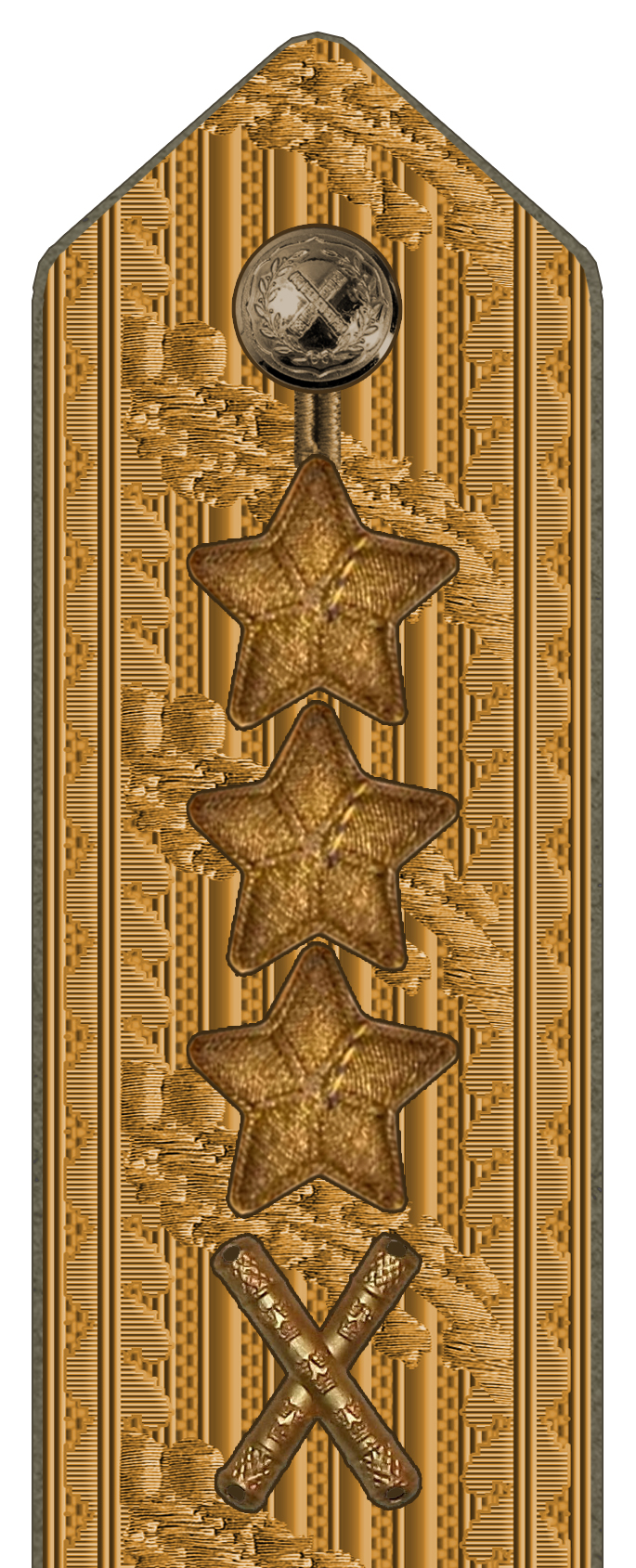
Shoulder mark on uniform m/1939
(1939–1958)

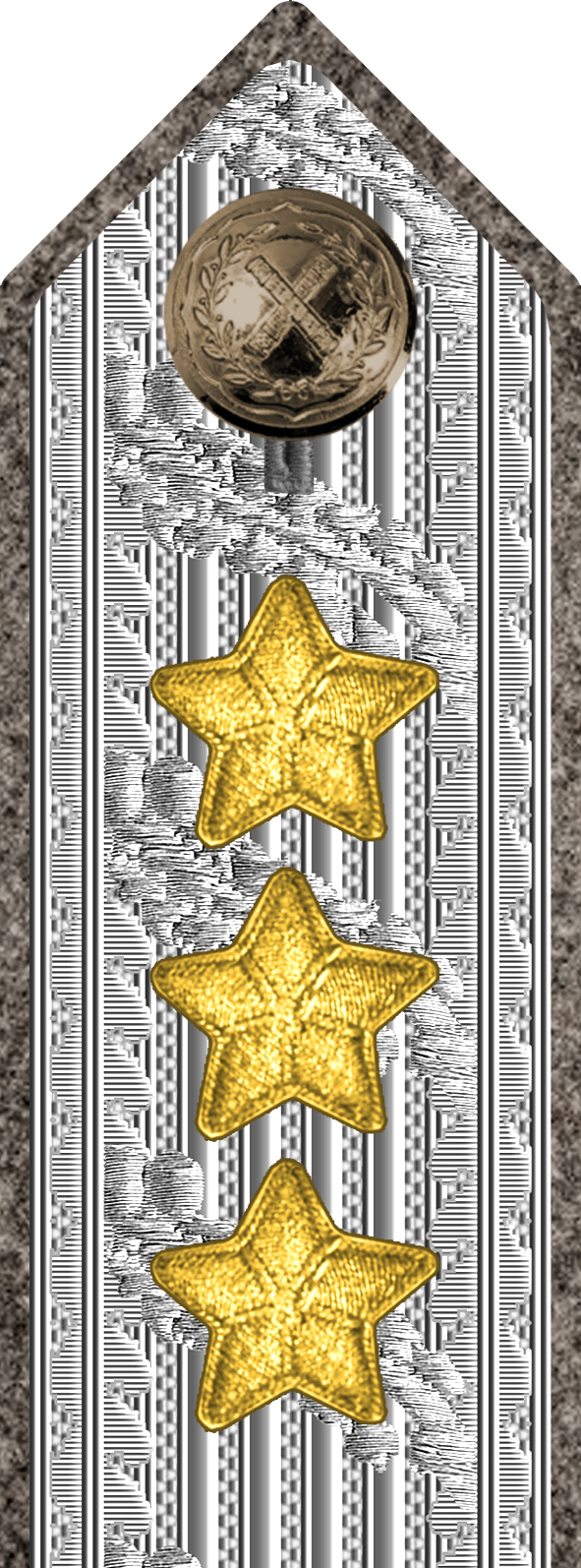
Shoulder mark on uniform m/1923
(1923–1939)

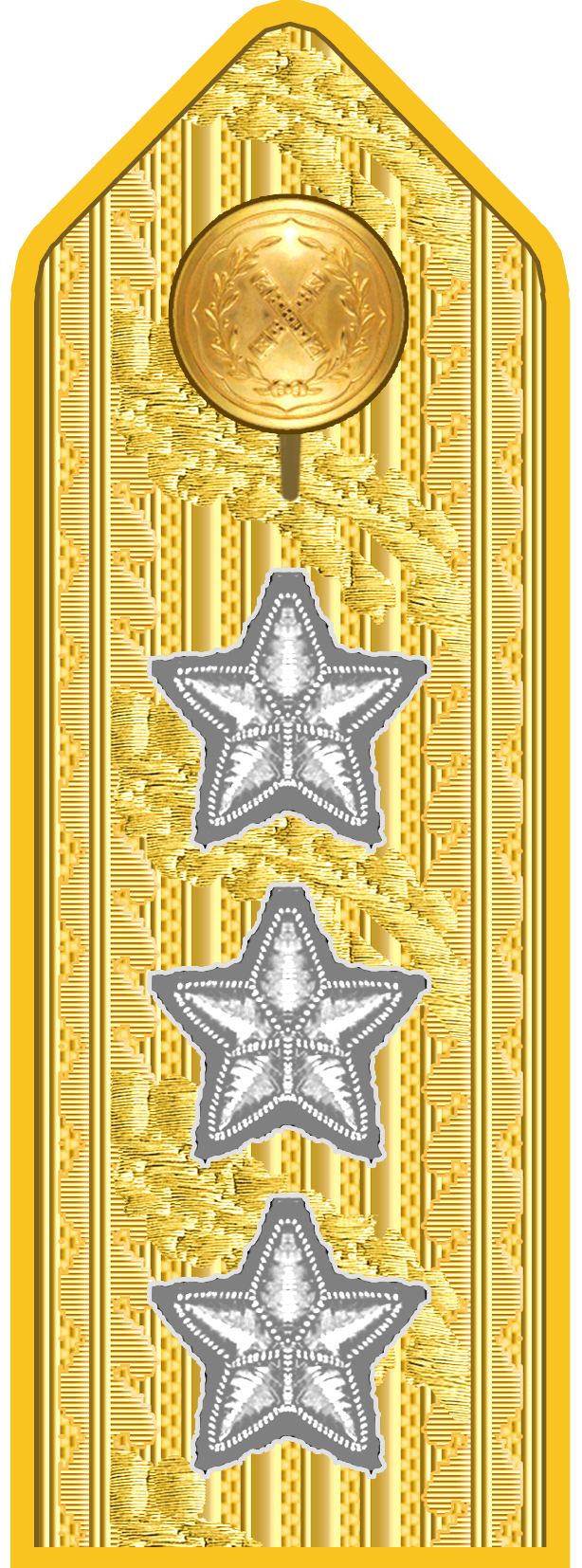
Shoulder mark on uniform m/1910
(1910–1923)

=== Sleeve insignias ===
==== Amphibious Corps and Coastal Artillery ====
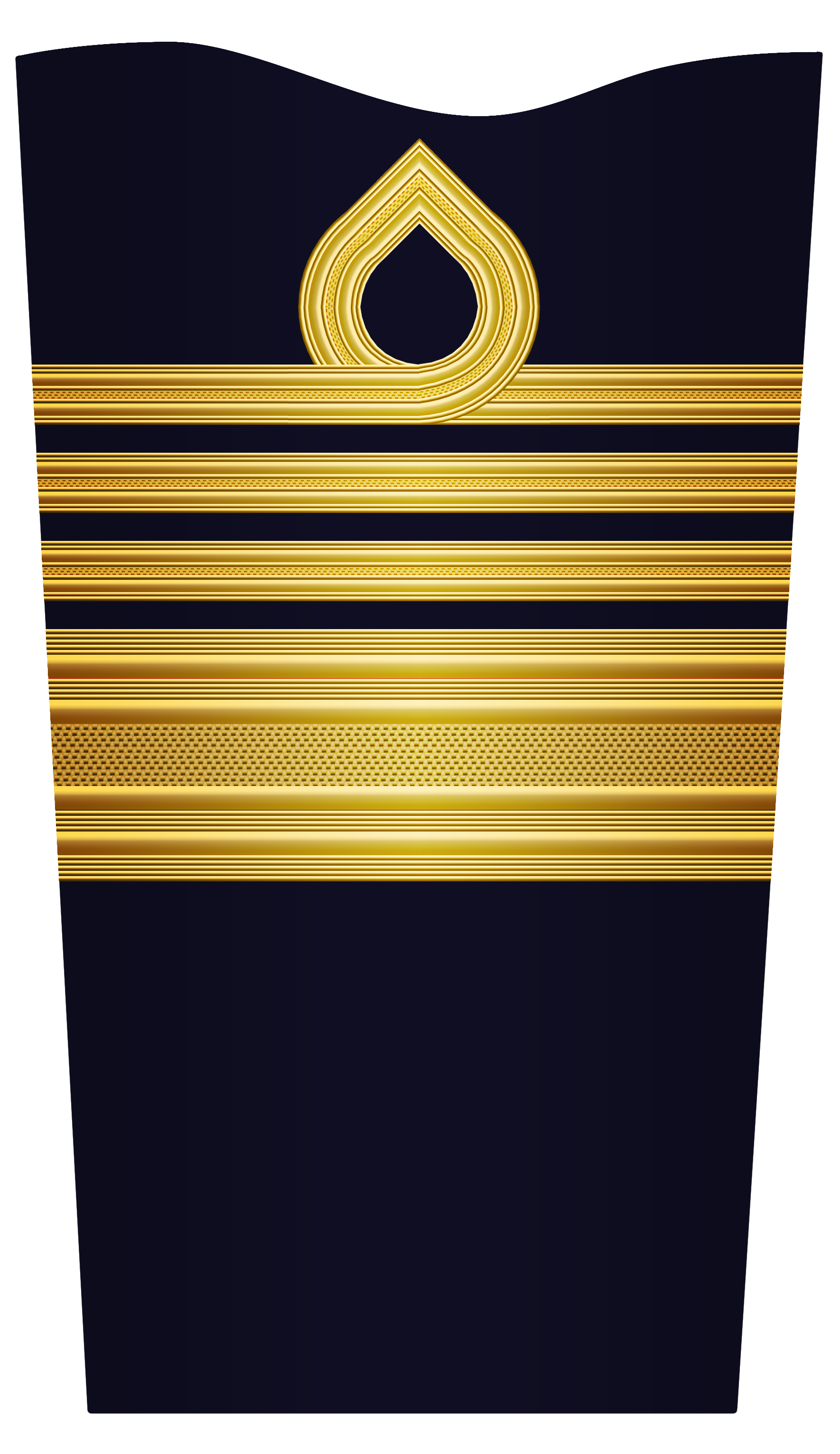
Sleeve insignia for a general in the Amphibious Corps
(2003–present)

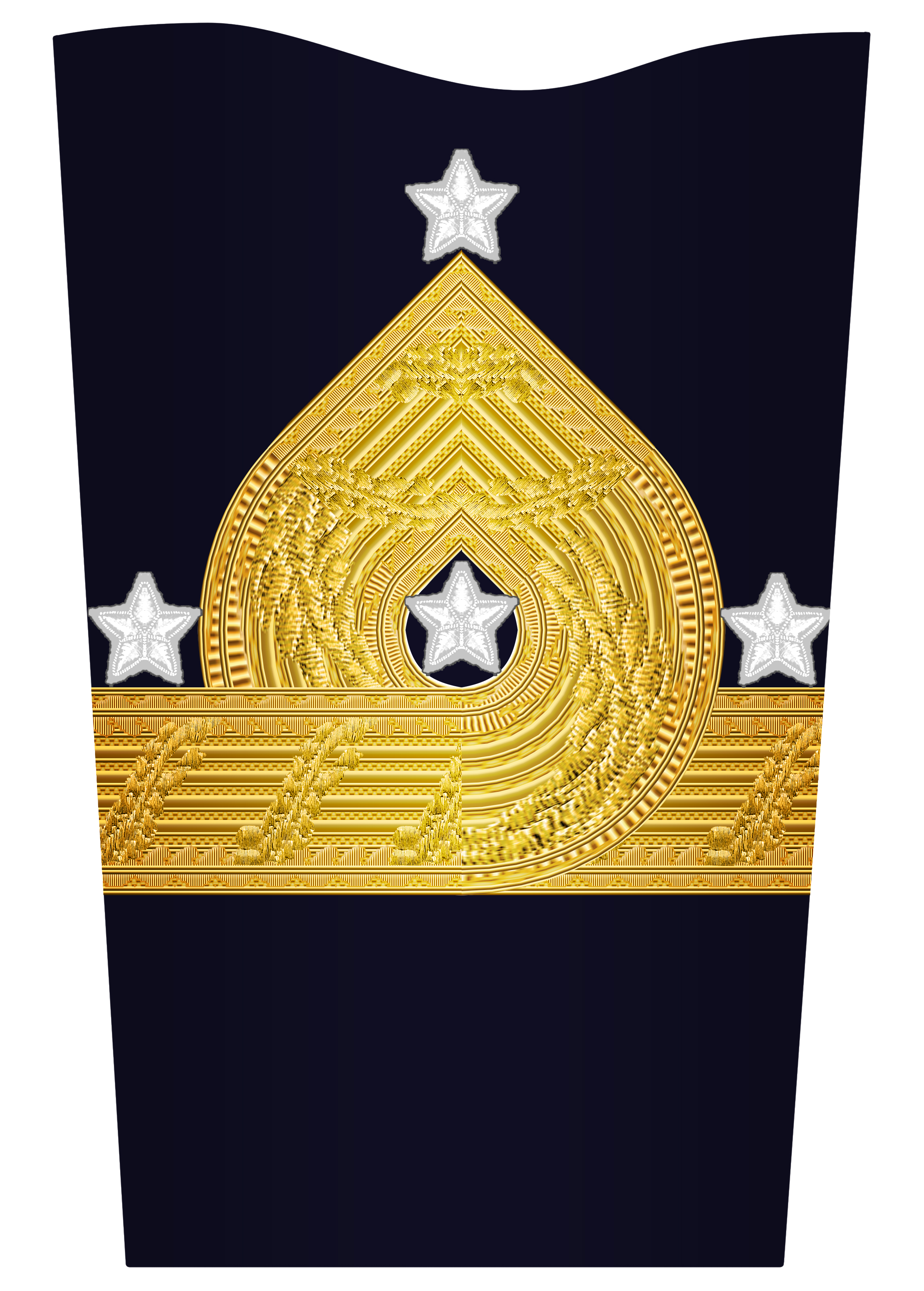
Sleeve insignia for a general in the Amphibious Corps
(2000–2003)
and
Coastal Artillery (1972–2000)

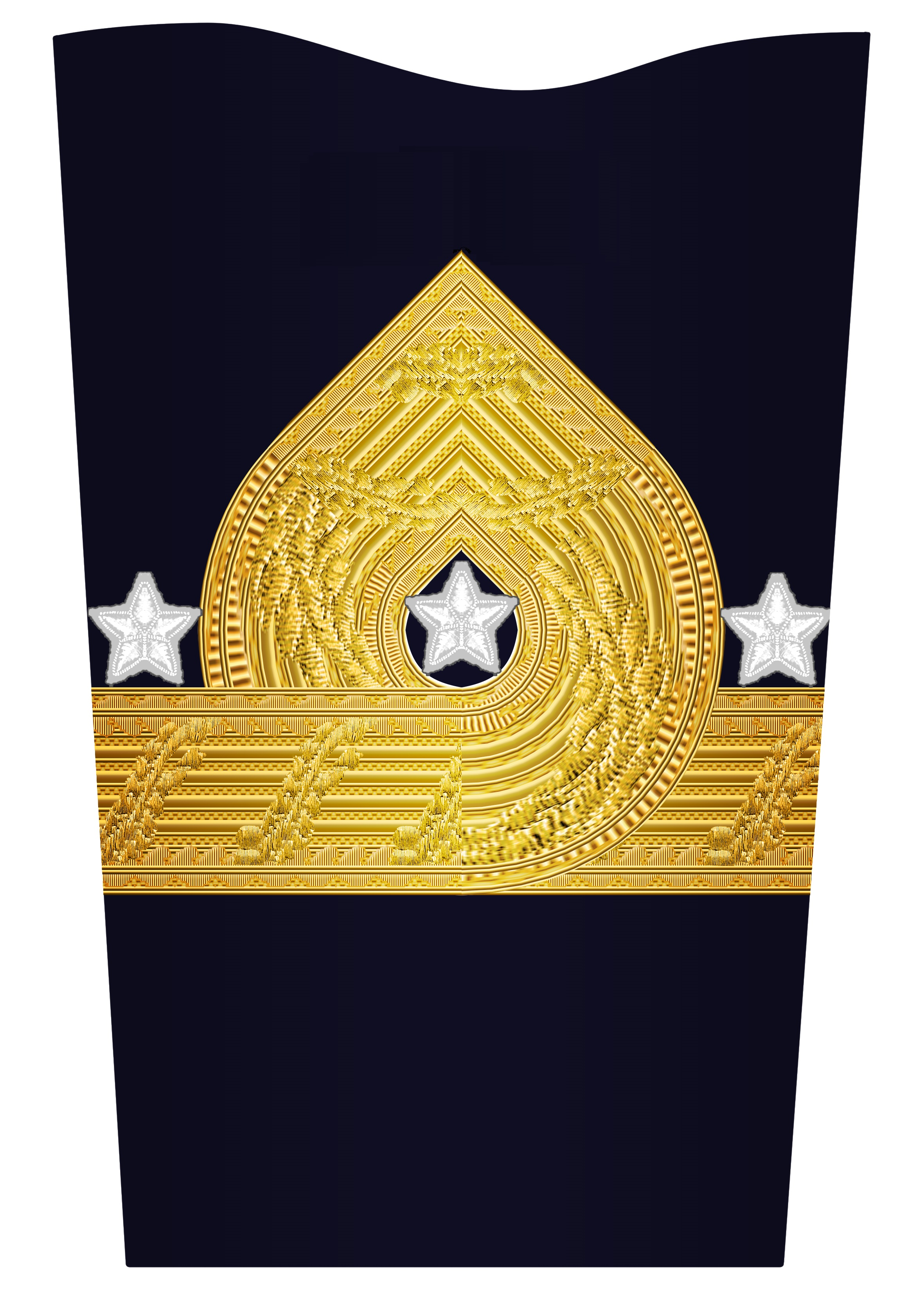
Sleeve insignia for a general in the Coastal Artillery
(1901–1972)

==== Air Force ====
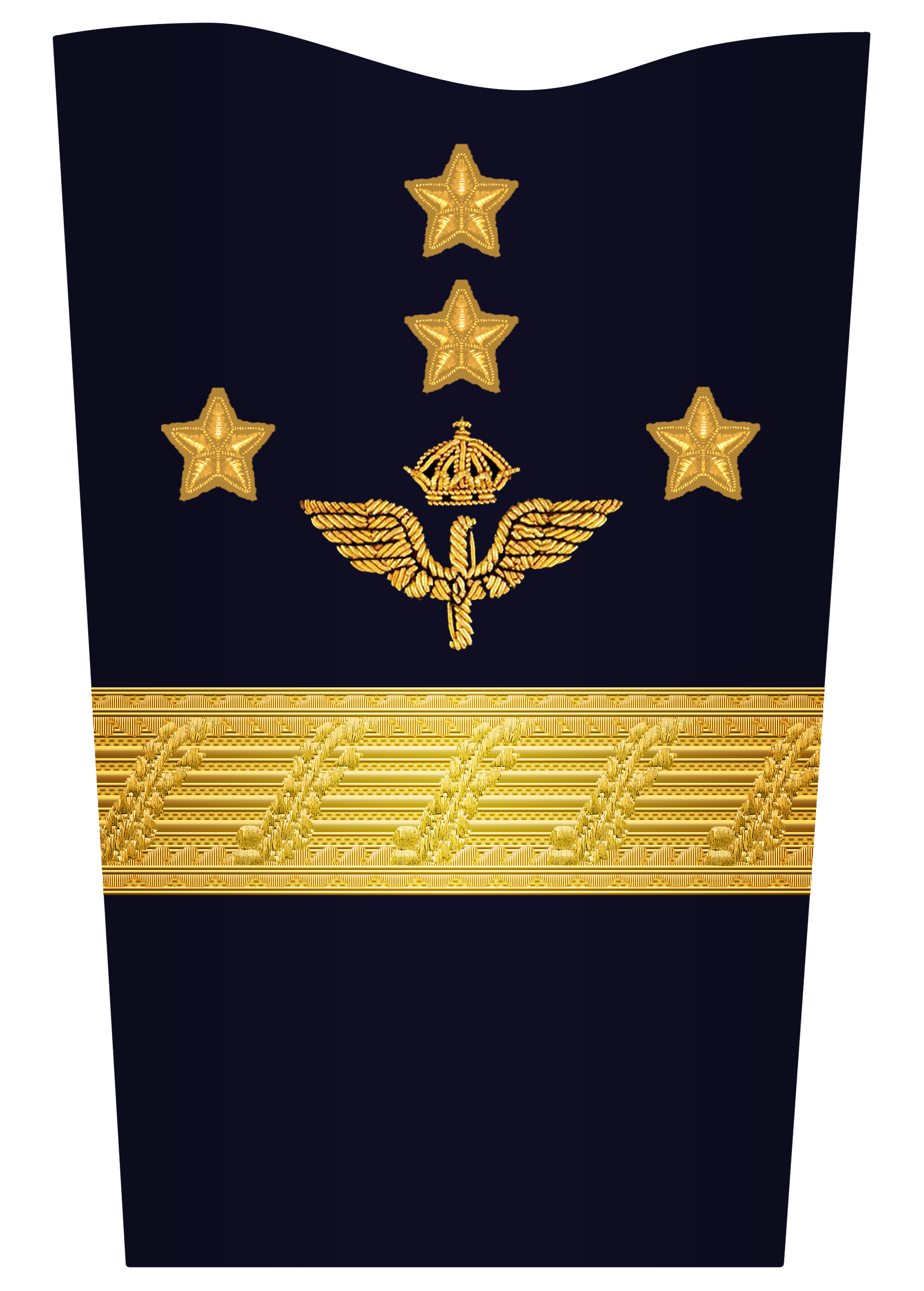
Sleeve insignia for a general (1972–present) (today only on mess dress uniform)

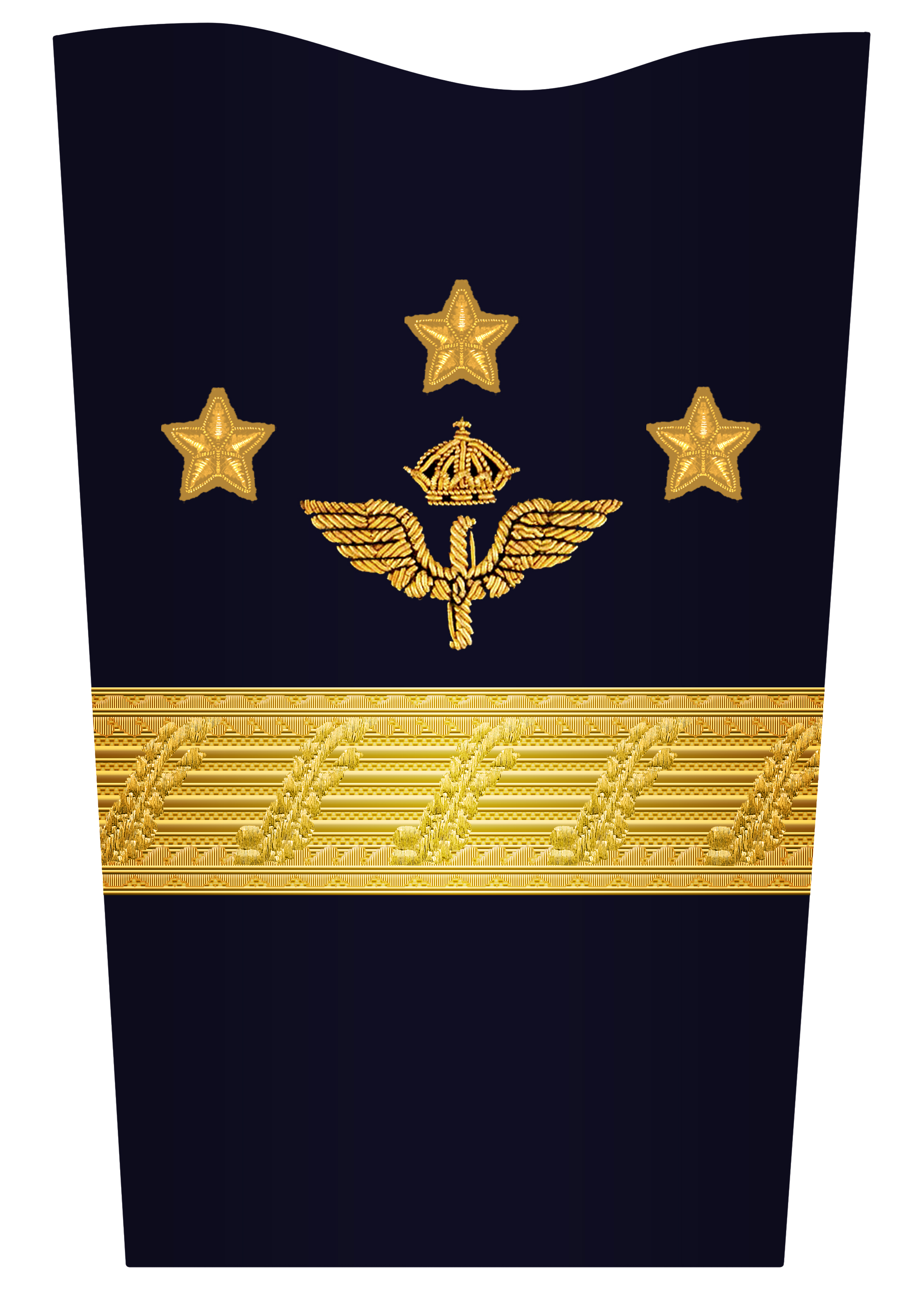
Sleeve insignia for a general (?–1972)

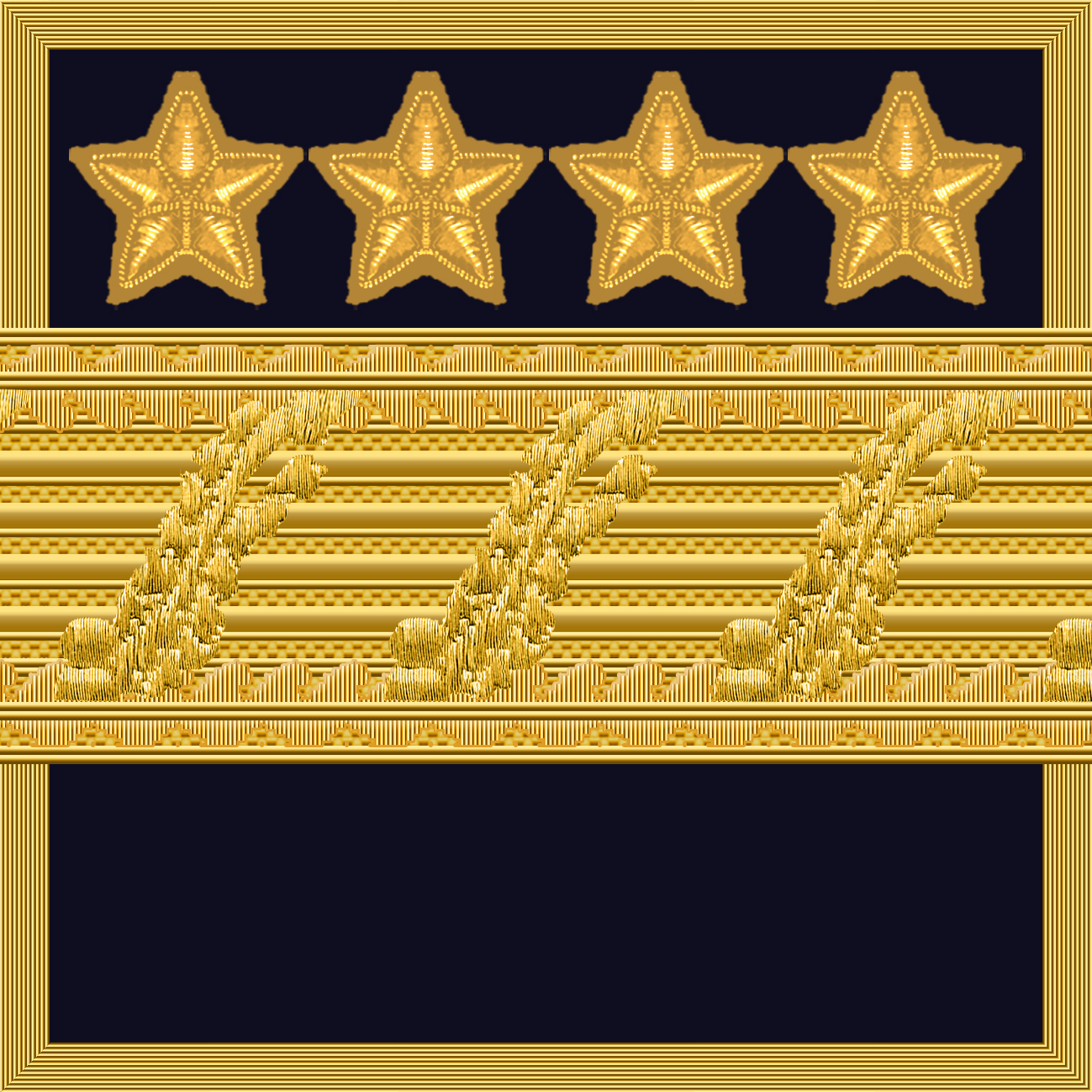
Flight suit sleeve insignia (Ärmmatta m/02) for a general
(1972–present)

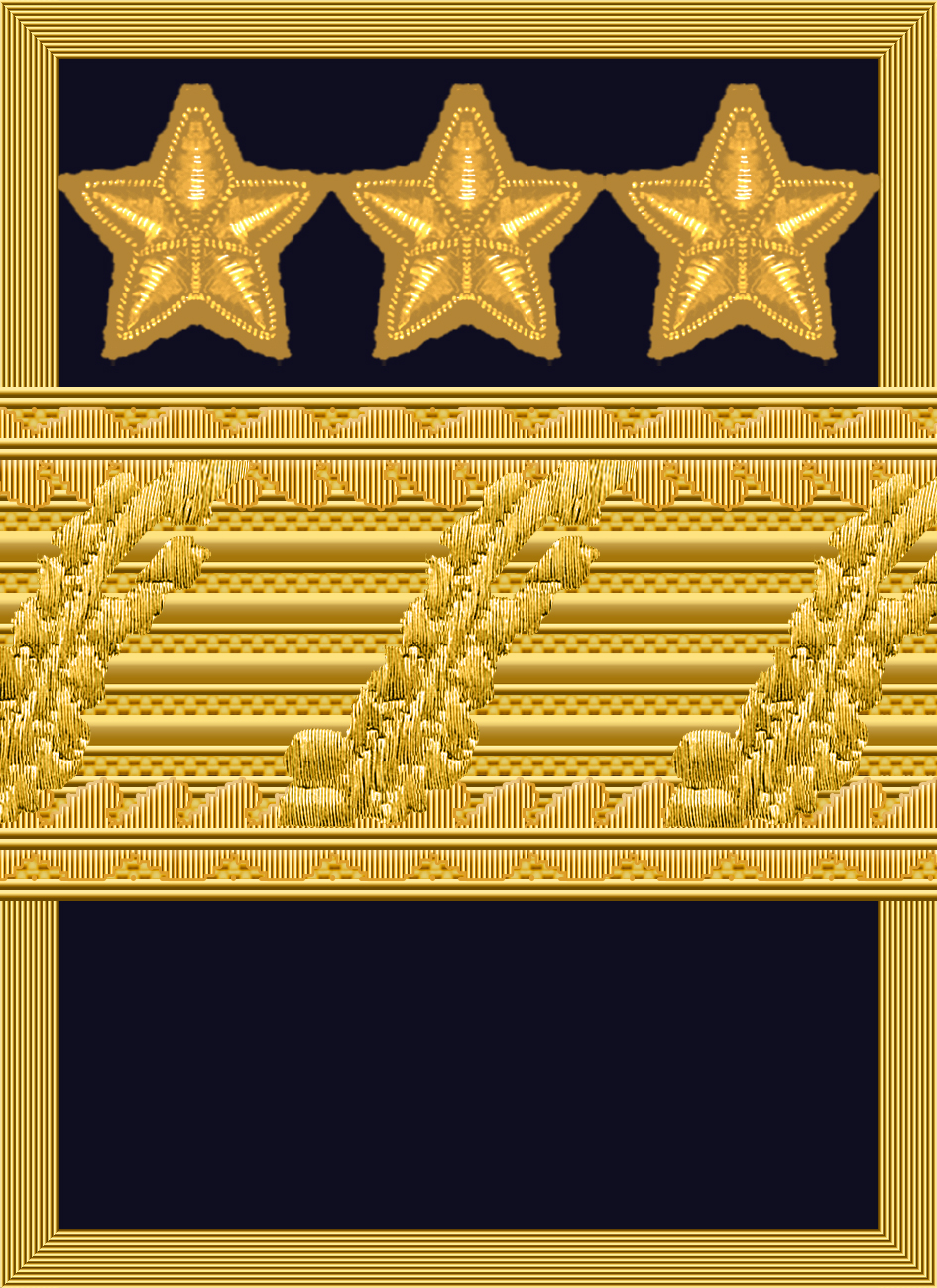
Flight suit sleeve insignia for a general
(?–1972)

==== Army ====
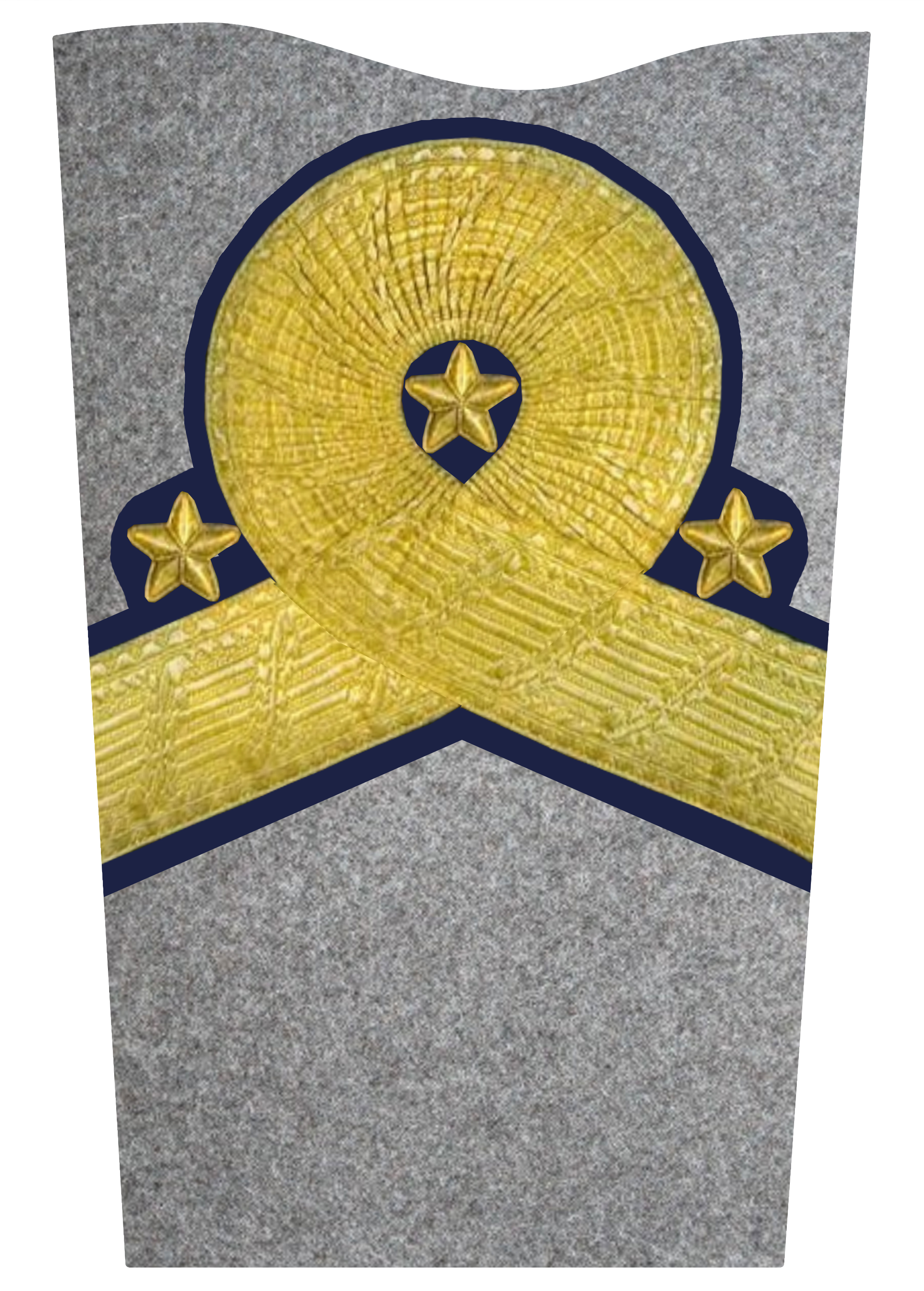
Sleeve insignia for a general on uniform m/1906
(1906–1923)

=== Hats ===
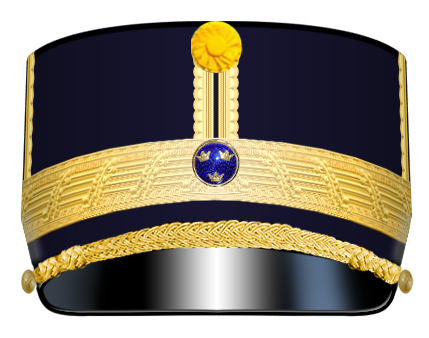
Hat for general of any rank on uniform m/1865-99
(1865–?)

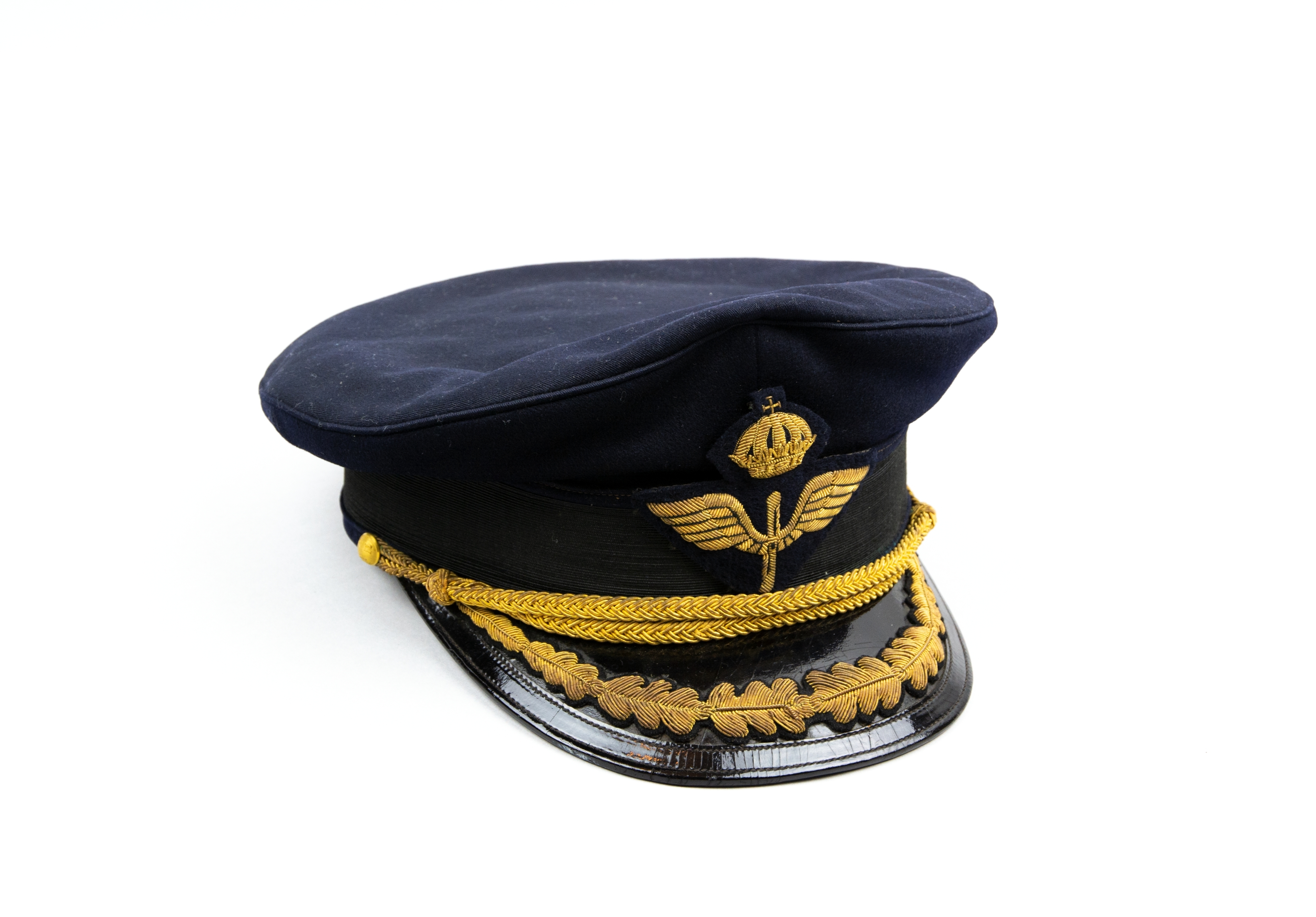
Peaked cap (dark blue) for air force general (Skärmmössa m/1930)
(1930–)

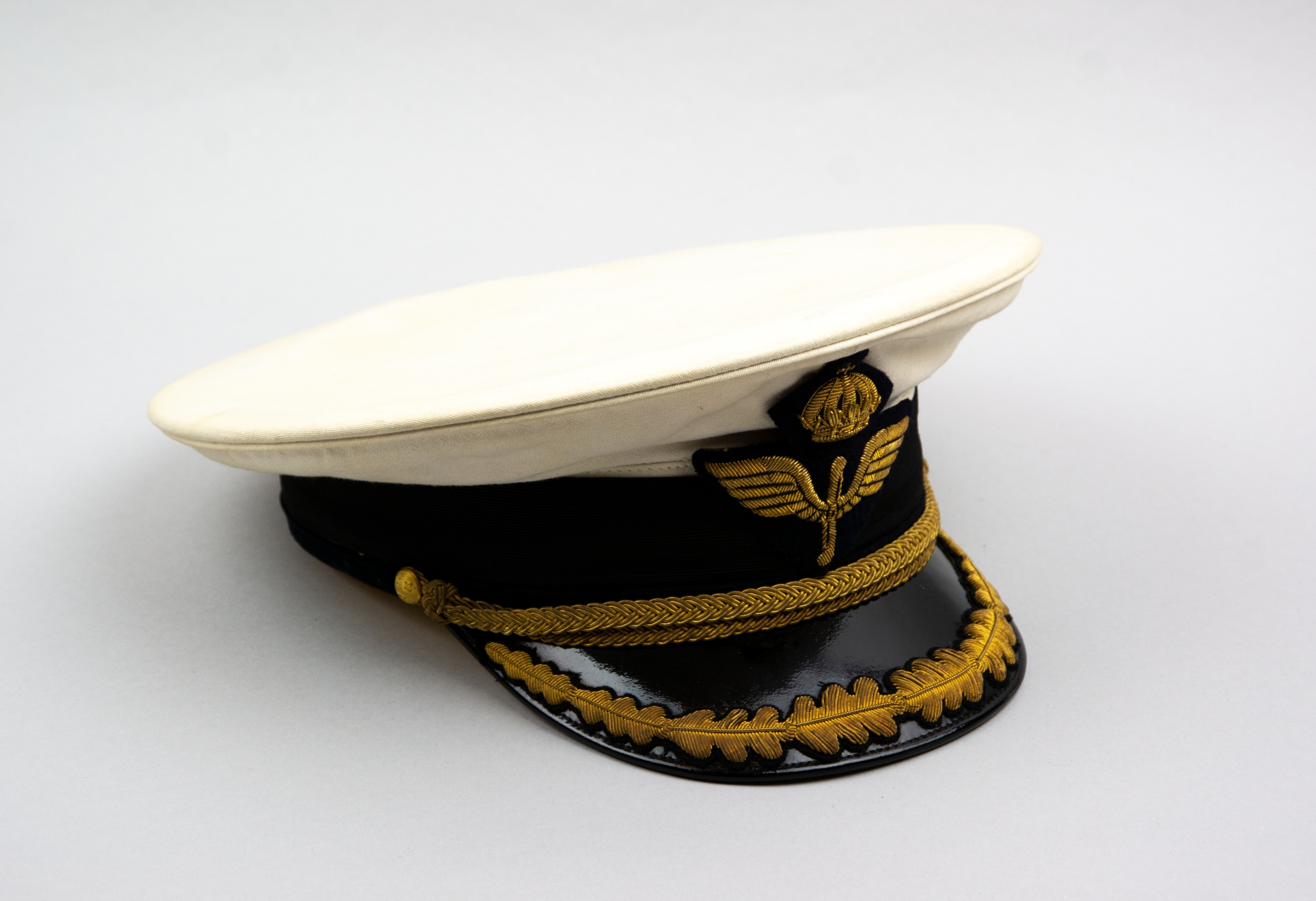
Peaked cap (white) for air force general (Skärmmössa m/1930)
(1930–)

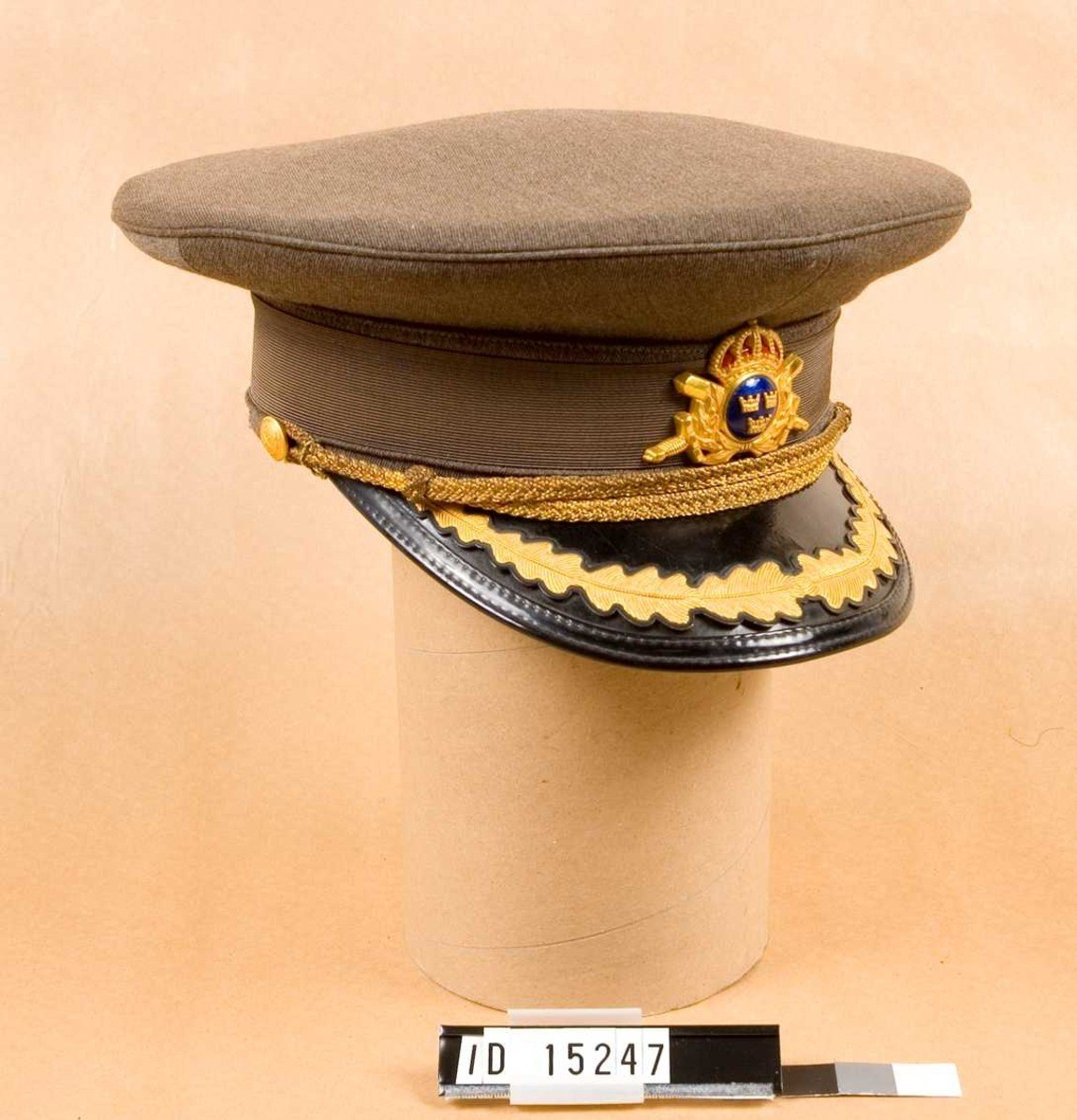
Peaked cap for army general (Skärmmössa m/1952)
(1952–)

== Personal flags ==
The command flag of a general (and an admiral) is a double swallowtailed Swedish flag. In the first blue field 4 five-pointed white stars placed two over two.

Admiral/General (Note: The Supreme Commander of the Swedish Armed Forces used admiral's flag since 1942.) command flag (4 stars)
(1972–present)

Admiral/General command flag (3 stars)
(1905–1972)

== List of generals ==
The following have been promoted to the rank of general in the Swedish Armed Forces between 1900 and 2026. This colour indicates that the person was appointed honorary general in the Swedish Army.

Image	Country	Branch	Name	Year promoted	Born	Died	Notes	Ref
	(Sweden)	Army	Axel Rappe	1903	1838	1918	Chief of the General Staff (1899–1905)	
	(Sweden)	Army	Hemming Gadd	1905 (Note: Upon retirement.)	1837	1915	Commander of the 4th Army Division (1896–1905); Commandant General in Stockholm (1905–1905); Chief of His Majesty's Military Staff (1905–1907)	
	(United Kingdom)	Army	Prince Arthur, Duke of Connaught and Strathearn	1906	1850	1942	Honorary General; Duke of Connaught and Strathearn (1874–1942)	
	(Grand Duchy of Baden)	Army	Frederick II, Grand Duke of Baden	1906	1857	1928	Honorary General; Grand Duke of Baden (1907–1918)	
	(Sweden)	Army	Prince Carl, Duke of Västergötland	1908	1861	1951	Prince of Sweden (1861–1951)	
	(Kingdom of Prussia)	Army	Wilhelm II, German Emperor	1908	1859	1941	Honorary General; German Emperor, King of Prussia (1888–1918)	
	(United Kingdom)	Army	Edward VII	1908	1841	1910	Honorary General; King of the United Kingdom and the British Dominions, Emperor of India (1901–1910)	
	(Sweden)	Army	Gustaf Uggla	1913	1846	1924	Commander of the 2nd Army Division (1902–1913); Chief of His Majesty's Military Staff (1910–1923)	
	(Sweden)	Army	Knut Gillis Bildt	1919	1854	1927	Chief of the General Staff (1905–1919)	
	(Sweden)	Army	Lars Tingsten	1922	1857	1937	Chief of the General Staff (1919–1922)	
Hammarskjöld as lieutenant general (1926–1930)	(Sweden)	Army	Carl Gustaf Hammarskjöld	1930	1865	1940	Chief of the General Staff (1922–1930)	
Gustaf VI Adolf in army uniform Gustaf VI Adolf in air force uniform	(Sweden)	Army / Air Force	Gustaf VI Adolf	1932	1882	1973	Crown Prince of Sweden (1907–1950); King of Sweden (1950–1973)	
Nygren as major general (1929–1937)	(Sweden)	Army	Oscar Nygren	1937 (Note: Upon retirement on 1 October 1937. However, Nygren was called back for service as commander of the 2nd Army Corps in Upper Norrland and in Western Sweden from 1939 to 1941.)	1872	1960	Chief of the General Staff (1933–1937)	
	(Sweden)	Army	Olof Thörnell	1940	1877	1977	Supreme Commander (1939–1944); Chief of His Majesty's Military Staff (1944–1950)	
	(Sweden)	Army	Helge Jung	1944	1886	1978	Supreme Commander (1944–1951)	
	(Sweden)	Army	Nils Swedlund	1951	1898	1965	Supreme Commander (1951–1961)	
	(Sweden)	Air Force	Bengt Nordenskiöld	1954 (Note: Appointed general on 30 April 1954, two months before his retirement on 30 June 1954, which can then be considered a tombstone promotion. Nordenskiöld was also the first non-royal general in the Swedish Air Force.)	1891	1983	Chief of the Air Force (1942–1954)	
	(Sweden)	Army	Carl August Ehrensvärd	1957	1892	1974	Chief of the Army (1948–1957)	
Ljungdahl as lieutenant general (1954–1960)	(Sweden)	Air Force	Axel Ljungdahl	1960	1887	1995	Chief of the Air Force (1954–1960)	
	(Sweden)	Air Force	Torsten Rapp	1961	1905	1993	Supreme Commander (1961–1970)	
Cederschiöld as major general (1937–1963	(Sweden)	Army	Hugo Cederschiöld	1963 (Note: Transferred to reserve in 1950, where he remained as lieutenant general until 31 December 1954. After resigning as Chief of His Majesty's Military Staff in 1963, Cederschiöld was promoted to general in the army on 23 May 1963.)	1878	1968	Chief of His Majesty's Military Staff (1950–1963)	
Bonde as lieutenant general (1957–1963	(Sweden)	Army	Thord Bonde	1963	1900	1969	Chief of the Army (1957–1963); Chief of His Majesty's Military Staff (1963–1969)	
Bonde as lieutenant general (1961–1968	(Sweden)	Air Force	Lage Thunberg	1968	1905	1997	Chief of the Air Force (1961–1968)	
	(Sweden)	Army	Curt Göransson	1969	1909	1996	Chief of the Army (1963–1969)	
Prince Bertil is admiral's uniform	(Sweden)	Army / Air Force (Note: Prince Bertil, Duke of Halland was general in the Swedish Army and in the Swedish Air Force (and admiral in the Swedish Navy).)	Prince Bertil, Duke of Halland	1969	1912	1997	Prince of Sweden (1912–1997)	
	(Sweden)	Army	Stig Synnergren	1970	1915	2004	Supreme Commander (1970–1978); Chief of His Majesty's Military Staff (1978–1986)	
Carl XVI Gustaf in army uniform	(Sweden)	Army / Air Force (Note: King Carl XVI Gustaf is general in the Swedish Army and in the Swedish Air Force (and admiral in the Swedish Navy).)	Carl XVI Gustaf	1973	1946	—	King of Sweden (1973–present)	
Norén as lieutenant general (1966–1973	(Sweden)	Air Force	Stig Norén	1973	1908	1996	Chief of the Air Force (1968–1973)	
Almgren as major general (1961–1966)	(Sweden)	Army	Carl Eric Almgren	1976	1913	2001	Chief of the Army (1969–1976)	
	(Sweden)	Army	Lennart Ljung	1978	1921	1990	Supreme Commander (1978–1986); Chief of His Majesty's Military Staff (1986–1990)	
	(Sweden)	Army	Bengt Gustafsson	1986	1933	2019	Supreme Commander (1986–1994)	
	(Sweden)	Air Force	Owe Wiktorin	1994	1940	—	Supreme Commander (1994–2000)	
Hederstedt as senior colonel (1993–1996)	(Sweden)	Army	Johan Hederstedt	2000	1943	—	Supreme Commander (2000–2003)	
	(Sweden)	Navy (Amphibious Corps)	Håkan Syrén	2004	1952	—	Supreme Commander (2004–2009); Chairman of the European Union Military Committee (2009-2012)	
	(Sweden)	Army	Sverker Göranson	2009	1954	—	Supreme Commander (2009–2015)	
	(Sweden)	Air Force	Micael Bydén	2015	1964	—	Supreme Commander (2015–2024)	
	(Sweden)	Army	Michael Claesson	2024	1965	—	Chief of Defence (2024–present)	
