= Axel Ryding =

Swedish army officer and politician

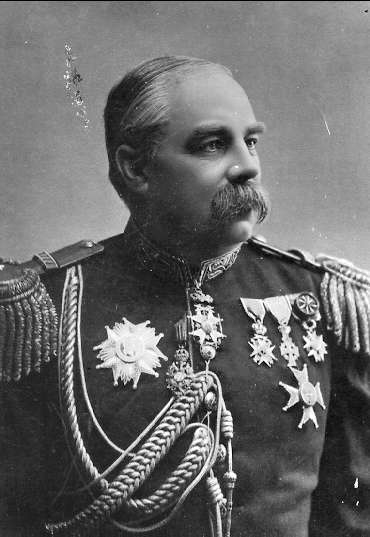
- Born: Knut Axel Ryding; 28 August 1831; Västra Tunhem, Sweden
- Died: 7 February 1897 (aged 65); Skövde, Sweden
- Military career
- Allegiance: Sweden
- Branch: Swedish Army
- Service years: 1851–1896
- Rank: Lieutenant General
- Commands: Military Office of the Ministry of Land Defence; Jämtland Ranger Corps; Skaraborg Regiment; Chief of the General Staff; 3rd Military District; 3rd Division
- Other work: Minister for War

Lieutenant General Knut Axel Ryding (28 August 1831 – 7 February 1897) was a Swedish Army officer. His senior commands include the post of Chief of the General Staff and commanding officer of the 3rd Military District and the 3rd Division. Ryding also served as Minister for War for five years.

== Early life ==
Ryding was born on 28 August 1831 at Sandgärdet, near Vänersborg, in Västra Tunhem socken, Älvsborg County. He was the younger brother of Gustaf Ryding (1833–1901), future Governor of Västernorrland County. He passed studentexamen in Uppsala in 1849.

== Career ==
Ryding was commissioned as an officer in the Göta Artillery Regiment in 1851 with the rank of underlöjtnant. Ryding was promoted to Captain there in 1863. In 1861–70 he served as a teacher of physics at the Higher Artillery School (Högre artilleriläroverket) in Marieberg and in 1863–72 he also served as a teacher of artillery and handguns at the Royal Military Academy. Furthermore, Ryding was a teacher of mathematics and physics at the Pharmaceutical Institute (Farmaceutiska institutet) from 1861 to 1875. After having served as secretary in the Committee on Defence in the Riksdag of 1871, Ryding was appointed General Staff officer the following year and was promoted to Major in the army that same year. Promoted to Lieutenant Colonel of the General Staff in 1873, he assumed the post of Chief of the Military Office of the Ministry of Land Defence in 1873. In 1875 he was promoted to Lieutenant Colonel and appointed commanding officer of the Jämtland Ranger Corps, from which he was transferred in 1879 as Colonel and regimental commander of Skaraborg Regiment. In February 1882, he was appointed Major General and Chief of the General Staff, but only held this position for a few months, when in June of that year he was appointed Council of State (Statsråd) and head of the Ministry of Land Defence, commonly known as Minister for War.

In this capacity, he presented to the Riksdag of 1883, that of the 1880 Land Defence Committee's (Lantförsvarskommittén), of which he was a member, large drafted proposal of a new army order; based on recruited regular troops and conscripts. However, despite the careful investigation of the defence issue and the persuasive manner in which Ryding fought for the implementation of the proposal, it was not adopted, mainly for the reason, that the Andra kammaren, by an overwhelming majority, decided to delete the provision contained in the proposal on the formation of reserve troops for the army, after which the Första kammaren rejected the proposal on the method of procurement of the regular troops. The fate, which thus affected the government's proposal, resulted in Ryding (along with the other members of the cabinet) asked for resignation from the cabinet, which, however, was not granted to him.

Over the next few years, Ryding tried with great energy on the "partial path of reforms" provide at least some increase in Sweden's defence force, but most of the proposals for that purpose, which were presented to the Riksdag, were stopped against the thrift of the Andra kammaren's majority. However, when the Riksdag did not grant the necessary funds, Ryding resigned in 1887 from the cabinet. However, in 1885, he had been appointed commanding officer of the 3rd Military District (Tredje militärdistriktet), which position along with the associated command of the 3rd Division (Tredje fördelningen) he held until 1896, when, broken by a long-standing illness, he retired from military service. Prior to that, in 1892, he had been promoted to Lieutenant General. In 1883–87 Ryding was a member of the Första kammaren for Västernorrland County and in 1891–92 a member of the Andra kammaren for the cities of Mariestad, Skövde and Falköping. Ryding was a member of the Committee on Construction Basics for Gun Carriage to Field Cannons (Kommittén angående konstruktionsgrunder för lavett till fältkanoner) in 1872, in the Committee on the Defense of the Inlets to Stockholm and other Ports (Kommittén angående försvaret av inloppen till Stockholm och andra hamnar) from 1878 to 1879 and (for some time) in the Land Defence Committee (Lantförsvarskommittén) from 1880 to 1882; Chairman of the Committee on Field Management and Stage Regulations (Kommittén angående fältförvaltnings- och etappreglementen) from 1888 to 1892; member of the Army Order Committee (Härordningskommittén) from 1890 to 1891; Chairman of the Committee on Armament Plans for the Fortifications in the Stockholm Archipelago (Kommittén angående bestyckningsplaner för befästningarna i Stockholms skärgård), etc. from 1891 to 1892.

== Personal life ==
Ryding married on 5 January 1875 in Vänersborg to Jenny Christina Rosalia (Rosalie) Petersson (5 February 1842 in Stockholm – 22 March 1925 in Stockholm), the daughter of Carl Gustaf Petersson and Johanna Maria Winberg. They had three children; Karin Astrid Kristina (born 3 April 1878), Jenny Marika Charlotta (20 August 1880 – 6 January 1955) and Johan Karl Axel (born 23 April 1882).

== Death ==
Ryding died on 7 February 1897 in Skövde. He was buried at Sankta Elin Cemetery in Skövde.

== Dates of rank ==
- 1851 – Underlöjtnant
- 1856 – Lieutenant
- 1863 – Captain
- 1872 – Major
- 1873 – Lieutenant Colonel
- 1879 – Colonel
- 1882 – Major General
- 1892 – Lieutenant General

== Awards ==
Ryding's awards:

- (Sweden) Commander Grand Cross of the Order of the Sword
- (Norway) Knight of the Order of St. Olav
- (Kingdom of Portugal) Grand Cross of the Saint Benedict of Aviz
- (France) Grand Officer of the Legion of Honour
- (Austria) Commander of the Order of Franz Joseph
- (Denmark) Knight of the Order of the Dannebrog

== Honours ==
- Member of the Royal Swedish Academy of War Sciences (1866)

Government offices
Preceded by Otto Taube	Minister for War; 1882–1887	Succeeded by Gustaf Oscar Peyron
Military offices
Preceded by Hugo Raab	Military Office of the Ministry of Land Defence; 1873–1875	Succeeded by Otto Taube
Preceded by C H H Mörner	Jämtland Ranger Corps; 1875–1879	Succeeded by Herman von Hohenhausen
Preceded by Alexander Johan Wästfelt	Skaraborg Regiment; 1879–1882	Succeeded by Gustaf Fredrik Snoilsky
Preceded by Hugo Raab	Chief of the General Staff; 1882–1885	Succeeded by Axel Rappe as Acting Chief of the General Staff
Preceded by Henrik Rosensvärd	3rd Military District; 1885–1893	Succeeded by None
Preceded by None	3rd Division; 1893–1896	Succeeded by Carl Ericson
