= Axel Rappe =

Swedish Army officer and Minister of War

Friherre Axel Rappe
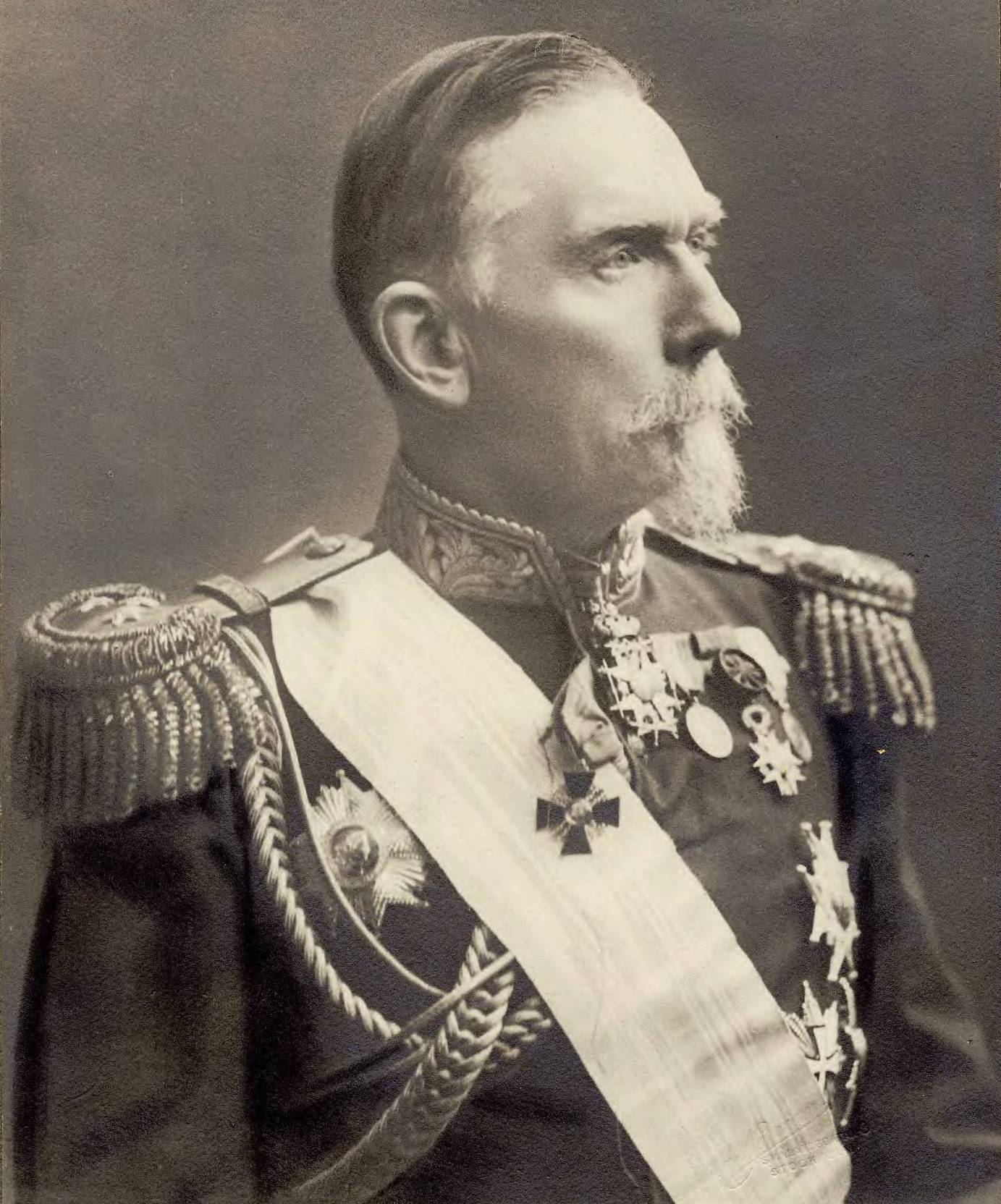

Minister for War
- In office 22 June 1892 – 27 October 1899
- Prime Minister: Erik Gustaf Boström
- Preceded by: Hjalmar Palmstierna
- Succeeded by: Jesper Crusebjörn

Personal details
- Born: Axel Emil Rappe; 2 October 1838 Arby, Kalmar Municipality, Sweden
- Died: 18 December 1918 (aged 80) Stockholm, Sweden
- Resting place: Norra begravningsplatsen
- Occupation: Military officer

Military service
- Branch/service: Swedish Army
- Years of service: 1859–1903
- Rank: General
- Commands: Chief of the General Staff
- Battles/wars: Franco-Prussian War

Friherre General Axel Emil Rappe (2 October 1838 – 18 December 1918) was a Swedish Army officer and Minister of War from 1892 and 1899.

== Early life ==
Rappe was born on 2 October 1838 in Christinelund manor in Arby, Kalmar County, the son of county governor Baron Axel Ludvig Rappe and his wife Lisette Björnstjerna. He passed studentexamen in 1857 and then kansliexamen in 1860, both in the city of Uppsala.

== Career ==
Rappe was commissioned as an officer in 1859 and was appointed underlöjtnant and was assigned to Uppland Regiment (I 8) the same year. He became a general staff officer in 1865. Rappe served in the French Army during the Franco-Prussian War from 1870 to 1871 and then in the French Army in Algeria from 1871 to 1872. Back in Sweden, Rappe became captain in the Swedish Army in 1870 and of the General Staff in 1873.

He was promoted to major in 1874 and major of the General Staff in 1876 and served as Chief of Staff of the 4th Military District (Fjärde militärdistriktet) from 1878 to 1879. Rappe was promoted to lieutenant colonel in the Bohuslän Regiment (I 17) in 1879 and was promoted to colonel in the army in 1881. He was appointed commanding officer of Bohuslän Regiment in 1882 and Acting Chief of the General Staff the same year. In 1885, Rappe was promoted to major general and was appointed Chief of the General Staff. He served as such until 1892 when he was promoted to lieutenant general and appointed Minister of War and head of the Ministry of Land Defence. In 1899 he resumed his duty as Chief of the General Staff and served as such until 1905. Rappe was promoted to general in 1903.

He has been called the spiritual father of Boden Fortress.

== Personal life ==
Rappe married on 2 May 1875 to Anna Sandahl (1855–1946), the daughter of Professor Oskar Theodor Sandahl and Jenny Magdalena Fredrika Huss. He was the father of opera singer Signe Rappe-Welden (1879–1974), Axel Rappe (1884–1945) who also became a military officer, and five more children. He was a member of the men's organization Sällskapet Idun.

== Death ==
Rappe died on 18 December 1918 in Stockholm. He was interred on 22 December 1918 at Norra begravningsplatsen in Stockholm.

== Dates of rank ==
Rappe's dates of rank:

- 13 July 1859 – Underlöjtnant
- 8 September 1863 – Lieutenant
- 29 December 1870 – Captain
- 4 December 1874 – Major
- 18 April 1879 – Lieutenant colonel and 1st Major
- 6 May 1881 – Colonel
- 30 December 1885 – Major general
- 2 December 1892 – Lieutenant general
- 4 December 1903 – General

== Awards and decorations ==
- (Sweden) Knight and Commander of the Orders of His Majesty the King
- (Norway) Commander 1st Class of the Order of St. Olav
- (Denmark) Grand Cross of the Order of the Dannebrog
- (France) Grand Officer of the Legion of Honour
- (Russian Empire) Knight 1st Class of the Order of Saint Anna

== Honours ==
- Member of the Royal Swedish Academy of War Sciences (1873)
- Honorary member of the Royal Swedish Society of Naval Sciences (1890)

Government offices
Preceded by Hjalmar Palmstierna	Minister for War; 1892–1899	Succeeded by Jesper Crusebjörn
Military offices
Preceded by Axel Ryding	Chief of the General Staff; 1885–1905	Succeeded by Knut Gillis Bildt
