= Carl Warberg =

Swedish Army lieutenant general

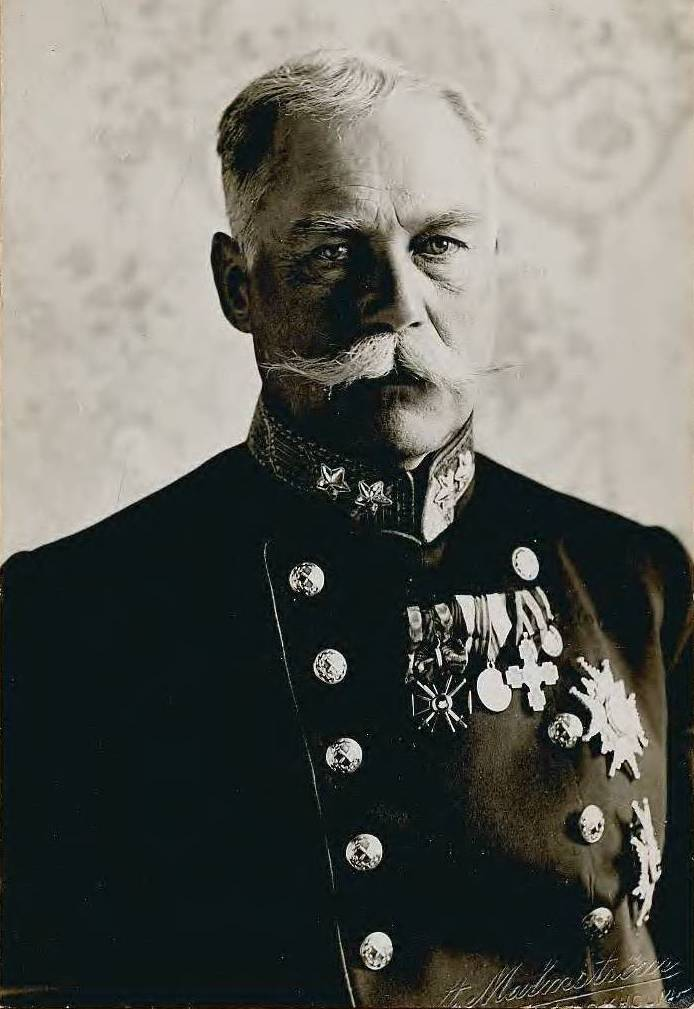
- Born: Casten Abraham Carl Warberg; 2 December 1845; Värmdö, Sweden
- Died: 16 October 1910 (aged 64); Stockholm, Sweden
- Burial place: Solna Cemetery
- Military career
- Allegiance: Sweden
- Branch: Swedish Army
- Service years: 1864–1910
- Rank: Lieutenant General
- Commands: North Scanian Infantry Regiment; Acting Chief of the General Staff; 6th Army Division; 4th Army Division; Commandant General in Stockholm
- Conflicts: Russo-Turkish War: Battle of Nikopol; Siege of Plevna
- Other work: Chief of His Majesty's Military Staff

Lieutenant General Casten Abraham Carl Warberg (2 December 1845 – 16 October 1910) was a Swedish Army officer. His senior commands include commanding officer of the 4th and 6th Army Divisions. Warberg also served as Acting Chief of the General Staff and as Commandant General in Stockholm. He was also the chief of His Majesty's Military Staff.

== Early life ==
Warberg was born on 2 December 1845 in Värmdö Municipality, Sweden. Warberg was commissioned as an officer in 1864 in 2nd Life Guards (Andra livgardet) with the rank of underlöjtnant.

== Career ==
Warberg attended the Royal Swedish Army Staff College in 1867 and was promoted to lieutenant the year after. In 1871 he was appointed general staff officer and was in 1874 appointed staff adjutant and lieutenant in the General Staff as well as to captain there in 1875. In 1877 he served a military attaché for six months in the Russian Army of the Danube during the Russo-Turkish War. Warberg was then stationed partly at the headquarters and partly in the 9th Army Corps. He attended the shelling and the battle of Nikopol fortress and the fortress's surrender in July. Furthermore, he was an attentive witness to the various afflictions at Plevna, Sgalevica and Pelisat as well as to the Siege of Plevna. Back in Sweden, Warberg served as chief of staff of the Life Guards Brigade (Livgardesbrigaden) from 1878 to 1881 and at the 4th Military District (4:e militärdistriktet) from 1881 to 1885.

Warberg exerted an extensive teacher and military literary activity. He was thus 1873–1877 teacher in the art of war at the Military Academy Karlberg and also taught for some time regulations and the laws of war. In 1875, according to his assignment, he revised the Stridslära för arméns underbefälsskolor ("Combat Teaching for the Army's Non-Commissioned Officers' Schools") and in 1875–1877 left an account of the historical development of the Swedish Army Service Troops. In 1878–1884 he taught art of war and war history at the Artillery and Engineering College. After having become captain in the 2nd Life Guards in 1879, Warberg advanced in 1884 to chief adjutant and major in the General Staff. He then served as vice chief in the Military Office of the Ministry of Land Defence from 1886 to 1888 when he was promoted to lieutenant colonel in the General Staff. Warberg was head of the Military Office from 1888 to 1891. He was promoted to colonel in 1891 and was appointed regimental commander of the North Scanian Infantry Regiment. He was Acting Chief of the General Staff from 1895 to 1899, and in 1897, he was promoted to major general in the army. In 1899, Warberg was appointed commanding officer of the 6th Army Division (6. arméfördelningen).

Six years later, in 1905, Warberg was appointed commanding officer of the 4th Army Division (4. arméfördelningen) and was promoted to lieutenant general in the army. The same year, he was appointed Commandant General in Stockholm. From 1909 until his death a year later, he served as First Aide-de-Camp and Chief of the King's Staff. Warberg had also participated in the work of various committees. He was the secretary of the Swedish-Norwegian Committee for indication of proposals in the security service from 1879 to 1881, and after 1900–1901 having been heavily involved in the work for a new army order, Warberg was in 1903 the chairman of the committee for reviewing and reworking proposals for organizing the landstorm.

== Personal life ==
In 1874 he married Sophie Lagercrantz (1851–1934), the daughter of minister Gustaf Lagercrantz.

== Death ==
Warberg died on 16 October 1910 in Stockholm. He and his wife are buried at Solna Cemetery.

== Dates of rank ==
- 1864 – Underlöjtnant
- 1868 – Lieutenant
- 1875 – Captain
- 1884 – Major
- 1888 – Lieutenant colonel
- 1891 – Colonel
- 1897 – Major general
- 1905 – Lieutenant general

== Awards and decorations ==
=== Swedish ===
- (Sweden) Commander Grand Cross of the Order of the Sword (1 December 1904)

=== Foreign ===
- (Kingdom of Prussia) Knight 1st Class of the Order of the Red Eagle (1908)
- (Russian Empire) Knight of the Order of the White Eagle (1908)
- (Austria) Knight 1st Class of the Order of the Iron Crown (1908)
- (France) Grand Officer of the Legion of Honour (1908)
- (Denmark) Commander 1st Class of the Order of the Dannebrog (between 1894 and 1897)
- (Norway) Commander 1st Class of the Order of St. Olav (between 1901 and 1905)
- (Saxe-Weimar-Eisenach) Commander 1st Class of the Order of the White Falcon (between 1890 and 1894)
- (Russian Empire) Knight 3rd Class of the Order of Saint Anna (before 1890)
- (Russian Empire) Knight 4th Class of the Order of Saint Vladimir (before 1890)

== Honours ==
- Member Second Class of the Royal Swedish Academy of War Sciences (1884)
- Member First Class of the Royal Swedish Academy of War Sciences (1897)

Military offices
| Preceded by J O H Nordenskjöld | North Scanian Infantry Regiment; 1891–1899 | Succeeded by G W Lagercrantz |
| Preceded by Gustaf Toll | 6th Army Division; 1899–1905 | Succeeded by ? |
| Preceded by Hemming Gadd | 4th Army Division; 1905–1910 | Succeeded by Hugo Jungstedt |
| Preceded by Hemming Gadd | Commandant General in Stockholm; 1905–1910 | Succeeded by Hugo Jungstedt |
Court offices
| Preceded by Carl Rosenblad | Chief of His Majesty's Military Staff; 1909–1910 | Succeeded by Gustaf Uggla |
