= Hugo Raab =

Swedish Army officer (1831–1881)

Friherre Hugo Raab
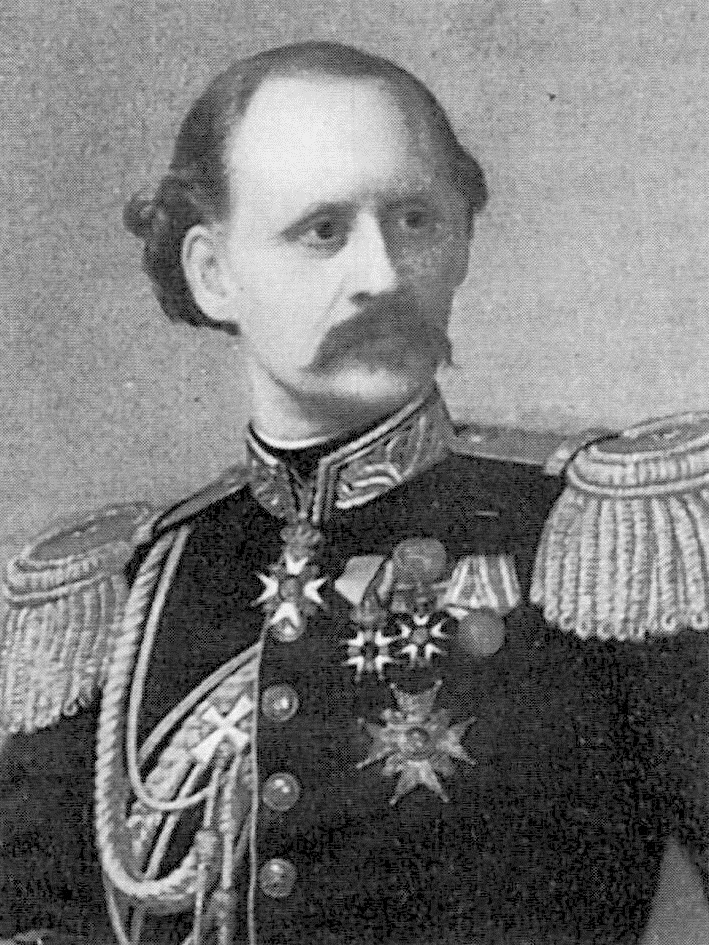
- Born: Claes Fredrik Hugo Raab; 25 November 1831; Ryssby, Sweden
- Died: 11 December 1881 (aged 50); Stockholm, Sweden
- Military career
- Allegiance: Sweden
- Branch: Swedish Army
- Service years: 1850–1881
- Rank: Major General
- Commands: Military Office of the Ministry of Land Defence; Chief of the General Staff
- Conflicts: Second Schleswig War: Battle of Dybbøl

Friherre Major General Claes Fredrik Hugo Raab (25 November 1831 – 11 December 1881) was a Swedish Army officer. Raab fought in the Second Schleswig War as a volunteer and later in his career became the first Chief of the General Staff. With his international outlook, his concrete experience of the everyday life of the war and his great work capacity, Raab was one of the Swedish Army's foremost officers during the 19th century. He contributed actively to lifting the army out of its difficult recession in the 1860s and initiated the modernization of higher staff functions, officer training and organization which in 1885 would result in a decisive decision on an extension of the conscription defence and rounded off with the replacement of the Allotment system with a conscription-based defence in 1901.

== Early life ==
Raab was born on 27 November 1831 at Ryssbylund manor in Ryssby Parish, Kalmar County, Sweden. Raab was educated at the Royal War Academy from 1847 to 1850 and was commissioned as an officer in Kalmar Regiment with the rank of underlöjtnant the same year.

== Career ==
Raab was employed as an adjutant to Carl von Mansbach, the Swedish-Norwegian minister in Berlin, and he attended the Prussian Staff College from 1855 to 1858. During that time, he was promoted (1857) to lieutenant of Kalmar Regiment. After returning to Sweden, in 1859, he was appointed General Staff officer. When the Second Schleswig War broke out in 1864, Raab sought and obtained a position as a senior lieutenant in the Danish Army. Initially employed at the headquarters, he participated in the battle of Dybbøl on 17 March, but was soon seconded from there and assumed command of the 1st Company of Swedish and Norwegian volunteers of captain Aaröe's corps. Best known among the expeditions carried out by this company under Raab's leadership is the nightly operation to Loit church village in Schleswig, at which time several prisoners were taken. For his participation in the war, however, Raab did not only receive praise, for many considered it less appropriate, since he had to thank Prussia for a not insignificant part of his military education. On the other hand, however, Raab, like his father, was a warm friend of the Scandinavian idea.

In 1865, Raab was promoted to captain of the Swedish Army and was appointed the same year as information officer in tactics, regulations and war articles at the Military Academy Karlberg. From January 1866 to September 1873, he was a teacher of warfare and war history at the Higher Artillery School (Högre artilleriläroverket, later the Royal Swedish Army Staff College) in Marieberg. During this time, he was promoted to captain in Kalmar Regiment in 1869, in 1870 to major in the army and in 1872 to lieutenant colonel in the army. The same year he assumed the post of Chief of the Military Office of the Ministry of Land Defence. In 1873 he drew up the proposal for criteria for a new, based on general conscription, fully contemporary army organization, which, after being examined by a committee, in whose work Raab was ordered to participate, was the basis for King in Council's presentation on the subject to the Riksdag of 1875. In 1873, Raab was appointed colonel and Chief of the General Staff, whose organization he was commissioned to construct. During the following years he also served as a member of several committees on the land defense (lantförsvaret). In 1877, Raab was promoted to major general of the army. In 1880 he was appointed a member of the then large Land Defense Committee (Lantförsvarskommittén).

Raab also worked as a military writer. Among his published works, except for dissertations - Kriget i Italien 1859 ("Italian War of 1859") (1859), Slaget vid Dennewitz ("Battle of Dennewitz") (1865) etc. - and essays in Kungl. Krigsvetenskapsakademiens handlingar och tidskrift, including Några ord om tidens kraf på lätt infanteri (1857), Om ändamålet med Stockholms befästande (1860), Den adliga rusttjensten (1870) and (together with Jesper Crusebjörn) Kort sammanfattning af de vigtigaste bestämmelserna rörande arméns organisation (1870).

Raab became a member of the Royal Swedish Academy of War Sciences in 1863 and edited its journal from 1870 to 1871. His primary career focus was improving Sweden's defense capabilities, specifically through attempting to restructure the army organization, though these specific efforts were unsuccessful. However, he effectively implemented reforms in other areas of the Swedish defense system, including reorganizing the General Staff and reforming the Royal Swedish Army Staff College.

== Legacy ==
The Hugo Raab Prize (Hugo Raab-priset) is awarded annually to a researcher, teacher or student at the Swedish Defence University who has performed one or several scientific works of outstanding quality over the past three years. The Hugo Raab Prize was established to promote scientific quality at the Swedish Defence University.

The Hugo Raab Day (Hugo Raab-dagen) is the Swedish Defence University's annual celebration day which usually occurs in November–December.

== Personal life ==
Raab married on 7 September 1869 in Stockholm to Lovisa (Louise) Johanna Charlotta Grill (19 May 1841 in Stockholm – 23 January 1908 in Stockholm), the daughter of Johan Daniel Grill, a physician, and Sofia Elisabeth Grill.

== Dates of rank ==
=== Swedish Army ===
- 9 November 1850 – Underlöjtnant
- 24 July 1857– Lieutenant
- 28 January 1865 – Captain
- 26 May 1870 – Major
- 12 April 1872 – Lieutenant colonel
- 5 December 1873 – Colonel
- 14 December 1877– Major general

=== Danish Army ===
- 2 March 1864 – Senior lieutenant

== Awards and decorations ==
- (Sweden) Commander 1st Class of the Order of the Sword
- (Norway) Commander 1st Class of the Order of St. Olav
- (Denmark) Commander 2nd Class of the Order of the Dannebrog
- (France) Officer of the Legion of Honour

== Honours ==
- Member of the Royal Swedish Academy of War Sciences (1863)
- Member of the Military Society
- Member of the Idun Society (Sällskapet Idun)

== Bibliography ==
- Raab, Hugo (1857). Några ord om tidens kraf på lätt infanteri (in Swedish). Stockholm. SELIBR 2980175.
- Raab, Hugo (1860). Kriget i Italien 1859: militäriskt utkast (in Swedish). Stockholm: Bonnier. SELIBR 2736561.
- Raab, Hugo (1860). Om ändamålet med Stockholms befästande: i anledning af J.Mankells skrift i samma ämne (in Swedish). Stockholm. SELIBR 2980176.
- Raab, Hugo, ed. (1861). Soldaten: utg. av Hugo Raab (in Swedish). Stockholm. SELIBR 3249451.
- Raab, Hugo; Crusebjörn, Jesper (1870). Kort sammanfattning af de vigtigaste bestämmelserna rörande arméns organisation: till ledning för undervisningen i militärskolorna (in Swedish). Stockholm: P. A. Norstedt & söner. SELIBR 19415607.
- Raab, Hugo; Crusebjörn, Jesper (1870). Kort sammanfattning af de vigtigaste bestämmelserna rörande arméns organisation (in Swedish). Stockholm: Ad Bonnier. SELIBR 1584501.

Military offices
Preceded by Carl Leijonhufvud	Military Office of the Ministry of Land Defence; 1872–1873	Succeeded by Axel Ryding
Preceded by None	Chief of the General Staff; 1873–1881	Succeeded by Axel Ryding
