= Gustaf Oscar Peyron =

Swedish military officer and politician

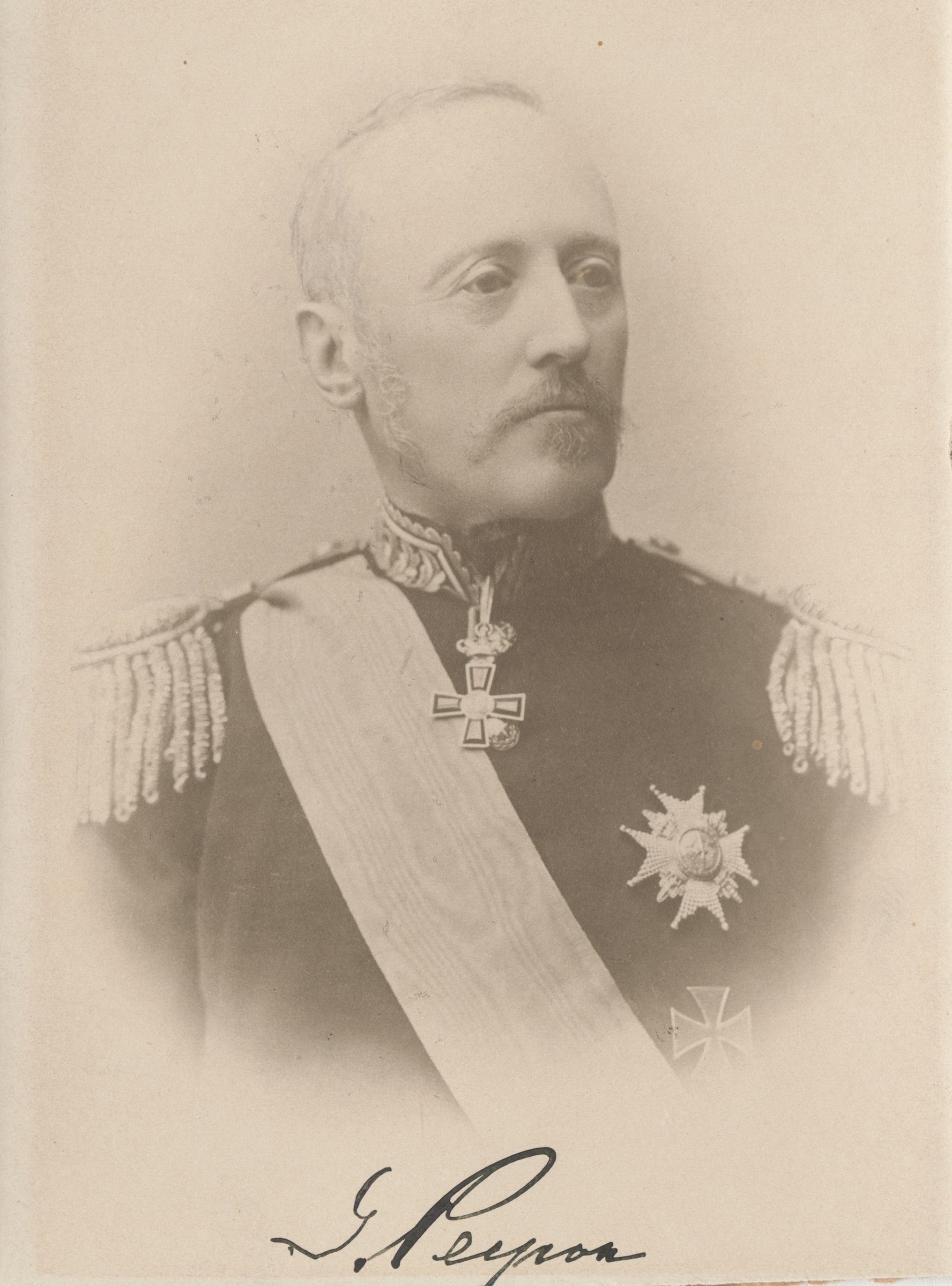

Gustaf Oscar Peyron (5 January 1828 – 2 March 1915) was a Swedish military officer and politician.

== Biography ==
He was born in Nyköping, into the Swedish nobility, as the son of future Minister for War Gustaf Peyron. From 1885 to 1896 he was Commander-in-chief of the 1st Military District.

Gustaf Oscar Peyron later followed in his father's footsteps and acted as Minister for War between 4 October 1887 and 6 February 1888.

Government offices
Preceded by Axel Ryding	Minister for War; 1887–1888	Succeeded by Hjalmar Palmstierna
