= Chief of the General Staff (Sweden) =

Foremerly the head of the Swedish Army General Staff

- Chefen för generalstaben
- Ministry of Defence
- Type: Chief of the General Staff
- Status: Abolished
- Abbreviation: CGst
- Member of: Ministry of Land Defence
- Reports to: King of Sweden
- Seat: Birger Jarls torg 10, Stockholm (1876–1926); Östermalmsgatan 87, Stockholm (1926–1937)
- Term length: No fixed term
- Formation: 5 December 1873
- First holder: Colonel Hugo Raab
- Final holder: Lieutenant general Oscar Nygren
- Abolished: 1937
- Unofficial names: Generalstabschef

The Chief of the General Staff (Swedish: Chefen för generalstaben, CGst, or Generalstabschef) was from 1873 to 1937 the second most senior member of the Swedish Army (after the King of Sweden) and headed the General Staff. The position was held by a senior member of the Swedish Army. In 1937, the position was abolished and the position of Chief of the Defence Staff was established.

== Chiefs of the General Staff ==
No.	Portrait	Chief of the General Staff	Took office	Left office	Time in office	Defence branch	Monarch	Ref.
1	Hugo Raab	Major general (Note: Raab was colonel when taking office on 5 December 1873 and was promoted to major general on 14 December 1877 while still in office.); Hugo Raab (1831–1881)	5 December 1873	1881	7–8 years	Army	Oscar II	
2	Axel Ryding	Major general Axel Ryding (1831–1897)	9 February 1882	1885	2–3 years	Army	Oscar II	
-	Axel Rappe	Colonel; Axel Rappe (1838–1918); Acting	14 July 1882	1885	2–3 years	Army	Oscar II	
3	Axel Rappe	General (Note: Rappe was major general when taking office on 30 December 1885 and was promoted to lieutenant general on 2 December 1892 and to general on 4 December 1903 while still in office.); Axel Rappe (1838–1918)	30 December 1885	1905	19–20 years	Army	Oscar II	
-	Ernst von der Lancken	Colonel; Ernst von der Lancken (1841–1902); Acting	25 June 1892	4 October 1895	3 years, 101 days	Army	Oscar II	
-	Carl Warberg	Colonel; Carl Warberg (1845–1910); Acting	1895	1899	3–4 years	Army	Oscar II	-
-	Knut Gillis Bildt	Colonel; Knut Gillis Bildt (1854–1927); Acting	3 February 1899	9 December 1899	309 days	Army	Oscar II	
-	Knut Gillis Bildt	Major general Knut Gillis Bildt (1854–1927); Acting	25 September 1905	3 November 1905	39 days	Army	Oscar II	
4	Knut Gillis Bildt	Lieutenant general (Note: Bildt was major general when taking office on 3 November 1905 and was promoted to lieutenant general on 28 October 1910 while still in office.); Knut Gillis Bildt (1854–1927)	3 November 1905	1919	13–14 years	Army	Oscar II; Gustaf V	
5	Lars Tingsten	Lieutenant general Lars Tingsten (1857–1937)	1919	1922	2–3 years	Army	Gustaf V	-
6	Carl Gustaf Hammarskjöld	Lieutenant general (Note: Hammarskjöld was major general when taking office on 14 June 1922 and was promoted to lieutenant general on 23 April 1926 while still in office.); Carl Gustaf Hammarskjöld (1865–1940)	14 June 1922	1930	7–8 years	Army	Gustaf V	
7	Bo Boustedt	Major general Bo Boustedt (1868–1939)	1930	28 August 1933	2–3 years	Army	Gustaf V	
8	Oscar Nygren	Lieutenant general (Note: Nygren was major general when taking office on 29 August 1933 and was promoted to lieutenant general on 1 July 1936 while still in office.); Oscar Nygren (1872–1960)	29 August 1933	30 June 1937	3 years, 305 days	Army	Gustaf V	

== See also ==
- Chief of the Defence Staff
