= General Staff (Sweden) =

- Generalstaben
- Active: 1873–1937
- Country: Sweden
- Allegiance: Swedish Armed Forces
- Branch: Joint
- Type: Staff
- Role: Operational, territorial and tactical activities
- Part of: Ministry of Land Defence
- Garrison/HQ: Stockholm

Commanders
- Chief of the General Staff: See list

Insignia
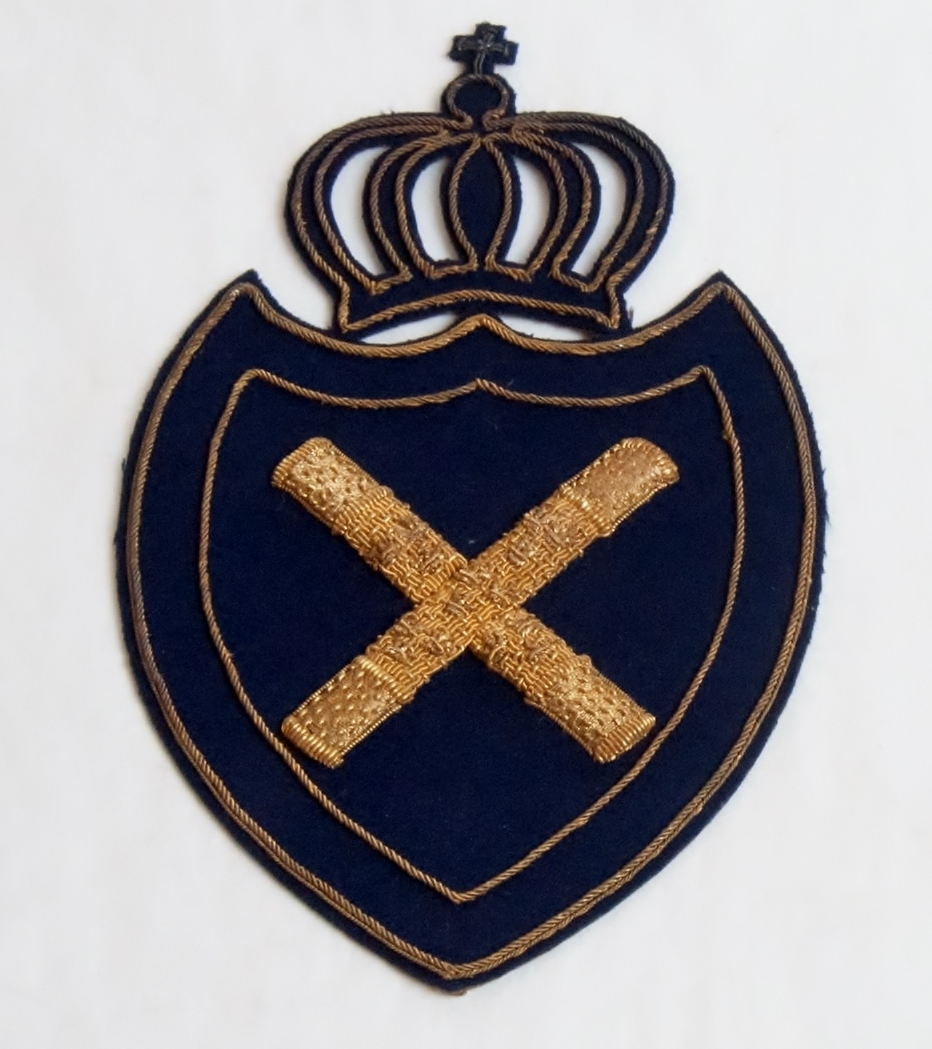
- Branch insignia m/1906

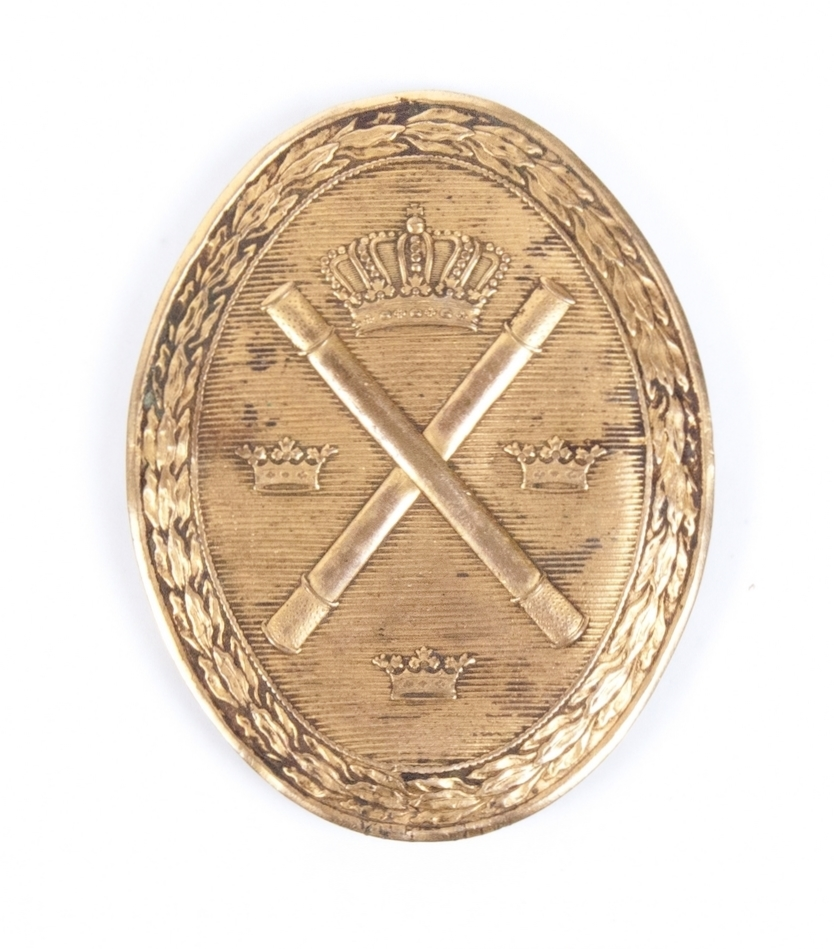
- Baldric

The General Staff (Swedish: Generalstaben, Gst) was a Swedish government agency established in 1873 and was active until 1937. It was headed by the Chief of the General Staff which was a senior member of the Swedish Army.

== History ==
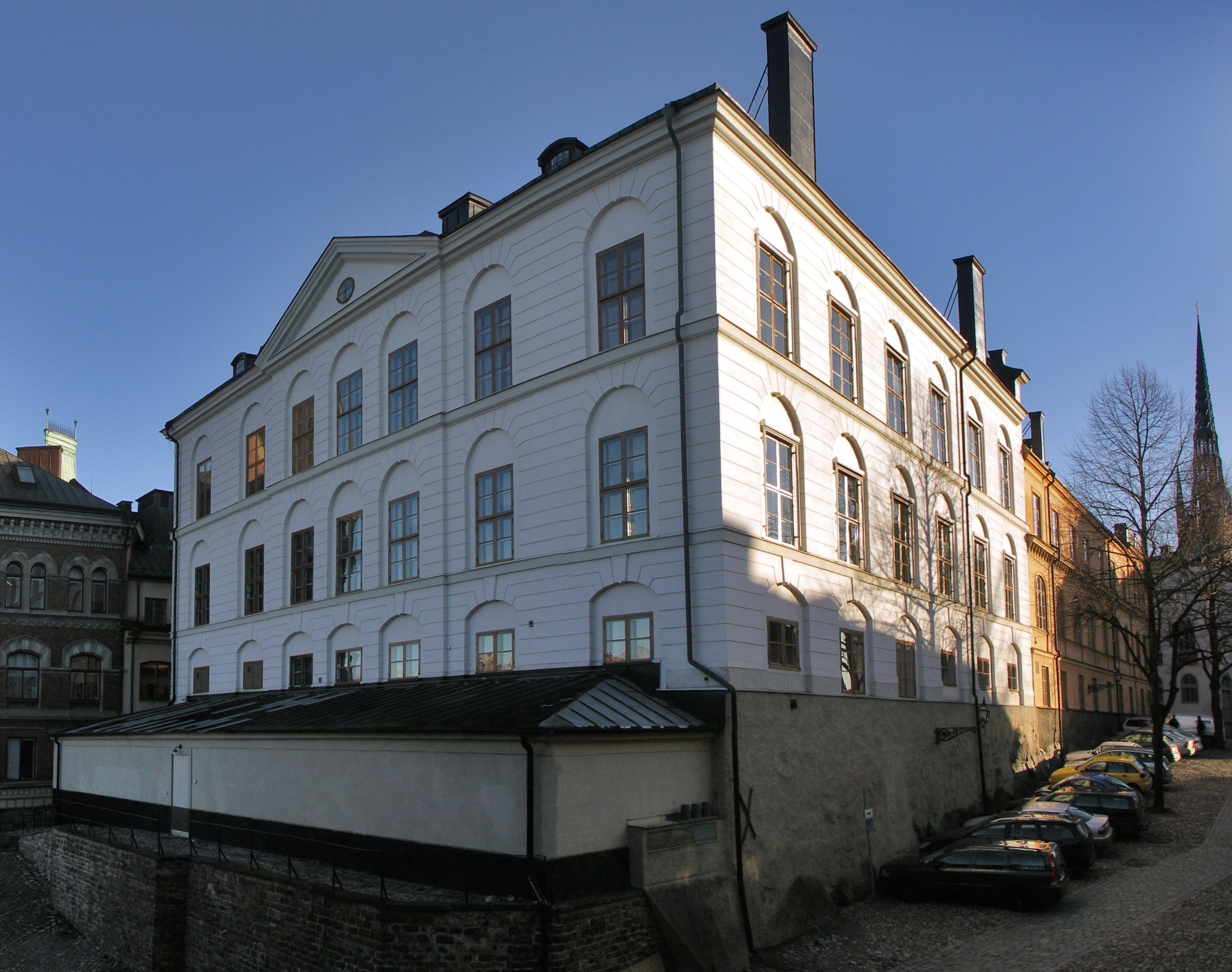
The building (Schering Rosenhane's Palace) at Birger Jarls torg 10 where the General Staff was located from 1876 to 1926.

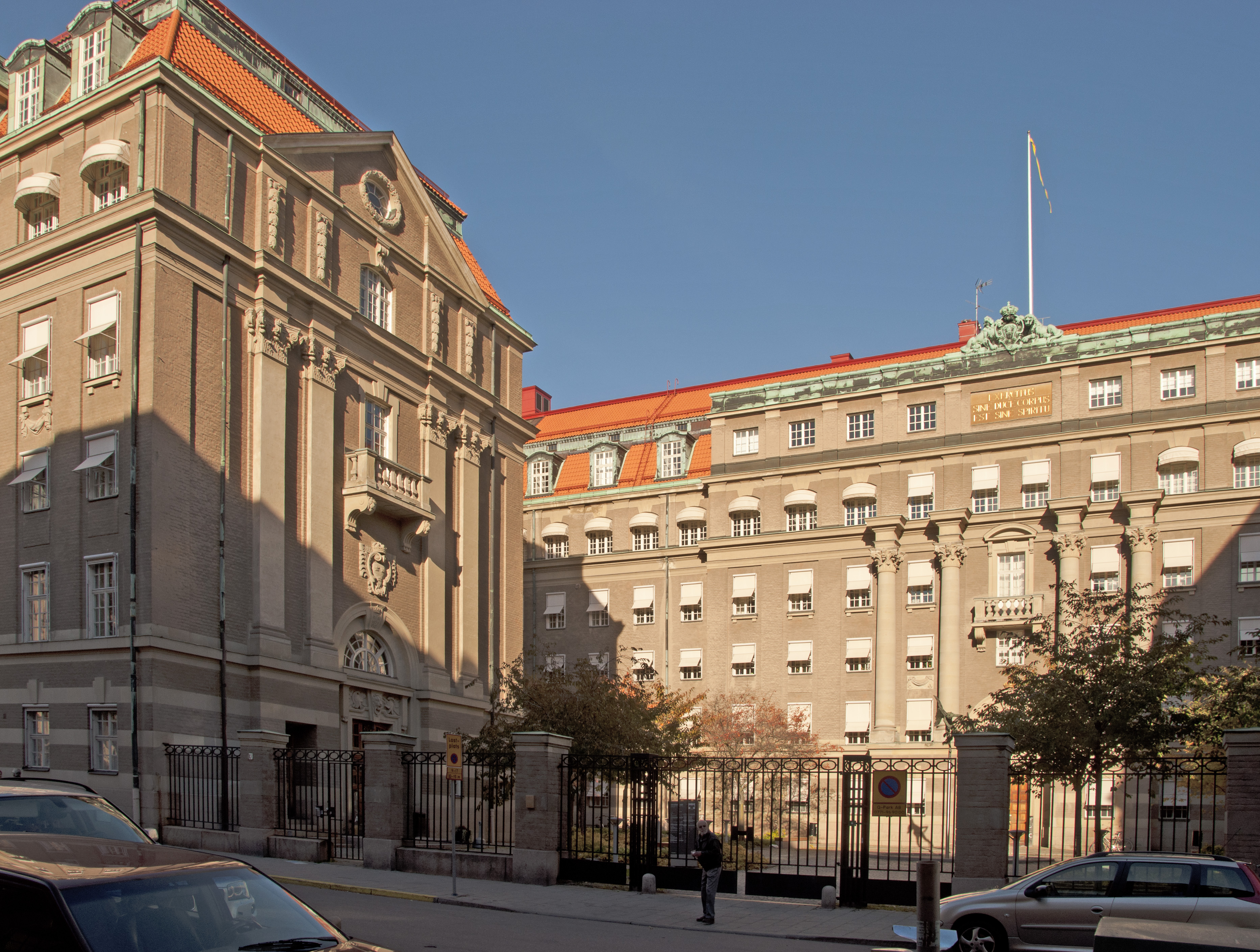
The building at Östermalmsgatan 87 in Stockholm where the General Staff was located from 1926 to 1937.

The first traces of a Swedish general staff were in Gustavus Adolphus's army. The king recruited young nobles to assist his own and other higher commanders, who usually later became commanders themselves. A quartermaster general already existed in the time of John III, but his activities were first decided by Charles X Gustav. Charles XII issued two ordinances (1709 and 1717) concerning the opposition of the General Staff. This was carried out by officers, who for the day were commanded by the army, usually some "major generals of the day" and adjutants general. During the following period, the officers of the Fortification Corps (Fortifikationskåren) usually fulfilled the general staff service, until Gustav III in 1788, through his so-called adjutant general, formed a general staff of officers commanded by the troops.

According to the 1806 instructions, the general staff consisted of adjutants general (with the rank of major general next to them) as well as chiefs and staff adjutants, commanded from the troops. The post of Quartermaster-General of the Swedish Army and the care of the Geographical Survey Office (Kartverket) had been transferred to the Field Surveying Corps (Fältmätningskåren), which was established in 1805. In 1816, the King in Council's general staff's force was determined to be 16 adjutants general, 48 general staff officers of regimental officers and 16 of captain's rank, all commanded. After several regulations during the years 1828–1838, the King's general staff consisted of an indefinite number of officers, appointed for the time being to be general staff officers. They would have undergone the so-called Higher Artillery School (Högre artilleriläroverket, later the Artillery and Engineering College), remained with their regiments and received a salary there. It was not until 1873 that the King in Council proposed to the Riksdag the establishment of a permanent general staff, which, after funds had been granted, was established and received instructions on 5 December 1873.

The General Staff was established in 1873 (SFS 1873:87). Its tasks was to contribute to the military science education in the army, train their officers and deliver them to the service of other agencies, study militarism abroad, elaborate plans for the army's mobilization and its concentration on different battlefields, write the country's military history and nurture its military historical archives, perform the country's military mapping and its study and description in military terms (whereby the Topographical Corps was merged with the General Staff). The instruction issued on 5 December 1873, was renewed on 17 June 1904. According to this instruction, the General Staff then formed a special corps and consisted of a general officer as its chief, 17 senior adjutants (2 colonels, 3 lieutenant colonels, 12 majors) and 30 staff adjutants (20 captains, 10 lieutenants) and 1 professor, 1 military archivist and 1 actuary, 1 librarian and others.

The General Staff was initially organized with a Chief of the General Staff with a head office and four departments: the Communications Department (1873–1937), Military Statistics Department (1873–1908), Military History Department (1873–1937) with the Military Archives and Topographical Department (1873–1937). Its officers occasionally serve in the Military Office of the Ministry of Land Defence and in the army divisions and other staffs. The task to handle the nations military mapping was transferred to the Geographical Survey Office of Sweden (Rikets allmänna kartverk) in 1894. The Military Statistics Department was divided in 1908 into three: the Central Department, Organization Department and the International Department. In 1912 the Communications Department was divided. One part retained the old name, and devoted themselves to the actual transportation policy. The other was called the Technical Department and devoted themselves to telegraphy, telephone, balloons, aircraft, automobiles and more. The Technical Department dissolved on 17 December 1931 and was replaced by the Education Department, which also dealt with questions about regulations and instructions relating to the education. The General Staff ceased to exist on 1 July 1937 and its duties were taken over firstly by the Defence Staff and the Army Staff.
