= Admiral (Sweden) =

Rank in the Swedish Navy

Admiral Amiral
- Flag of the admiral

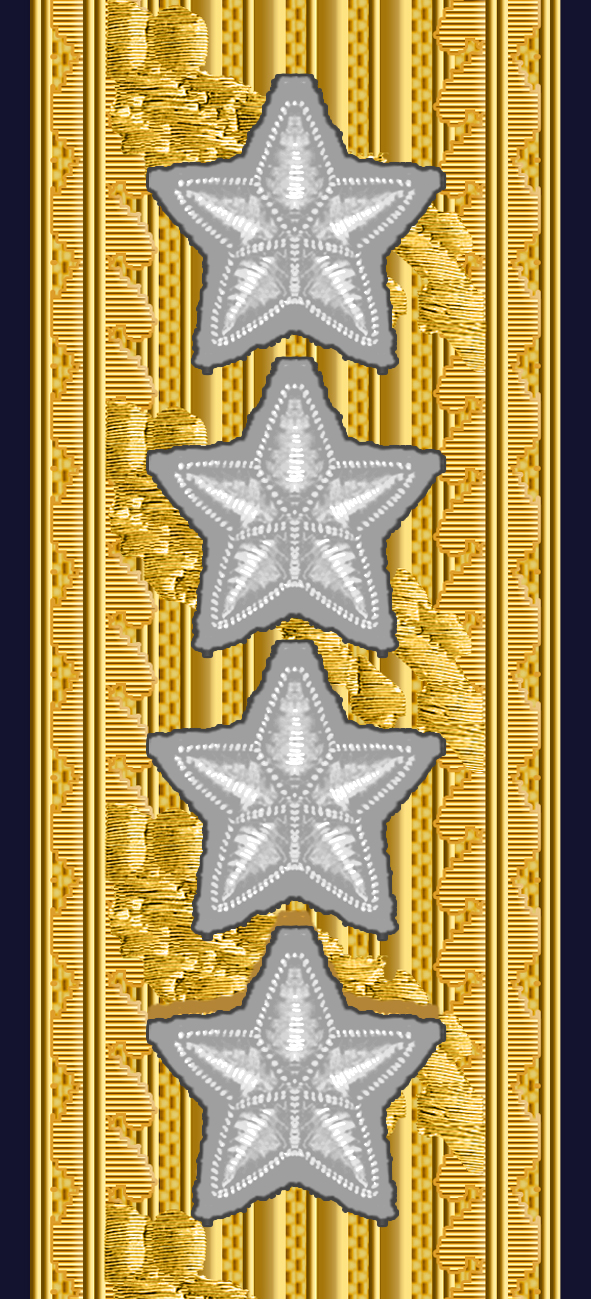
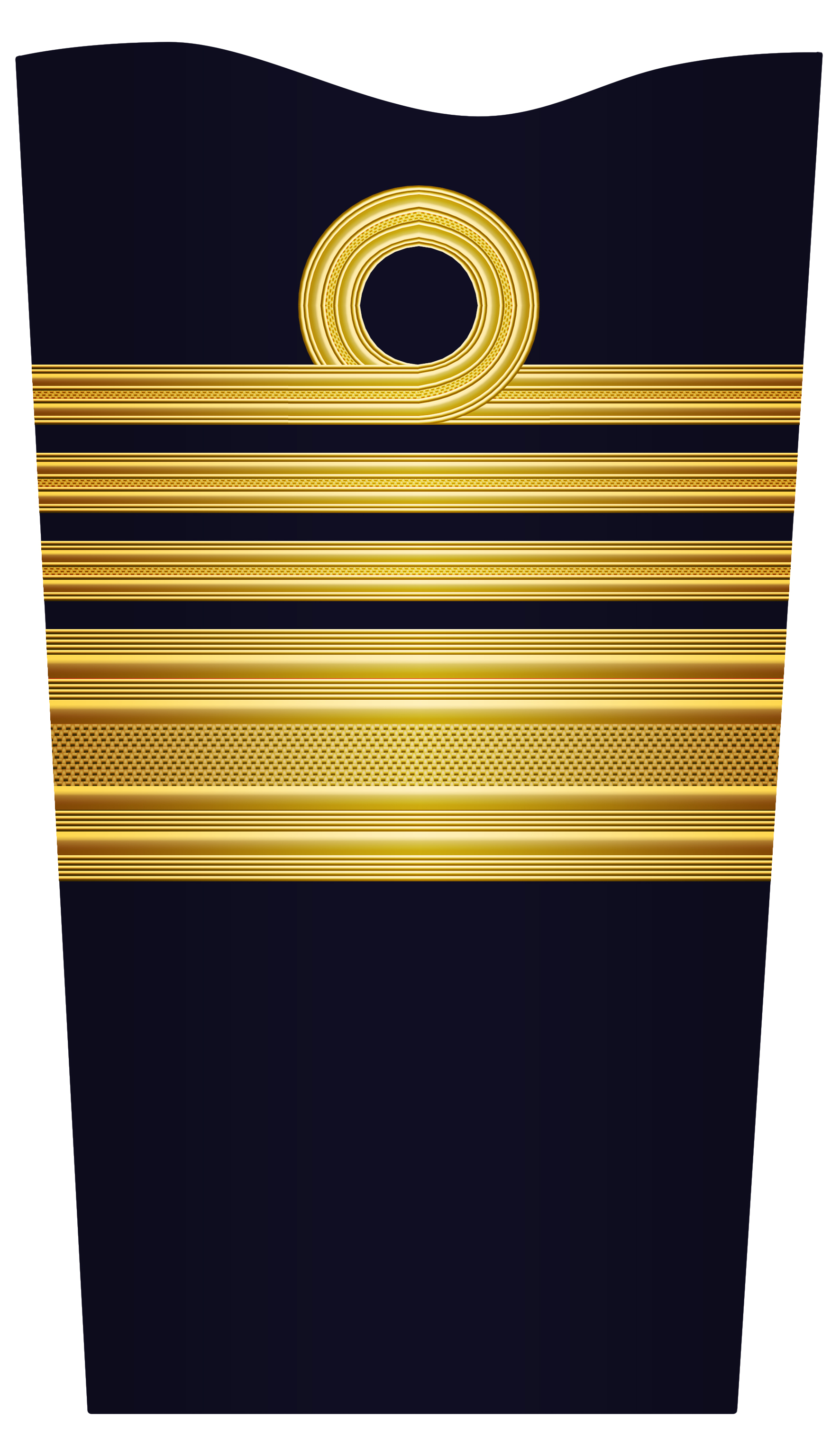
- Shoulder board and sleeve insignia of a Swedish four-star admiral.
- Country: Sweden
- Service branch: Swedish Navy
- Abbreviation: Am (Swedish), Adm (English)
- Rank group: Flag officer
- Rank: Four-star (Note: Admiral was a three-star rank until 1972 in the Swedish Armed Forces rank structure.)
- Formation: 1522
- Next lower rank: Vice admiral
- Equivalent ranks: General

Admiral (Adm) (Swedish: amiral, Am) is a four-star commissioned naval officer rank in the Swedish Navy. Admiral ranks immediately above vice admiral and is equivalent to general.

== History ==
In Sweden, the admiral's rank first appeared during the reign of Gustav I, who in 1522 gave it to Erik Fleming, a Council of the Realm. During Gustav's reign as king and throughout the latter part of the 16th century, the highest command of a fleet was led by a översteamiral ("colonel admiral"), to whose assistant a underamiral was appointed. It was not until 1569 that a permanent översteamiral was appointed; In 1602 the title was exchanged for riksamiral ("Admiral of the Realm"). The first permanent underamiral was appointed in 1575; his office ceased in 1619. Vice admiral is first mentioned in 1577. The admirals of the Swedish Navy have, incidentally, been as follows: generalamiral ("general admiral"), amiralgeneral ("admiral general"), storamiral ("grand admiral"), överamiral, riksviceamiral ("Vice Admiral of the Realm"), amiralgenerallöjtnant ("admiral lieutenant general"), amirallöjtnant ("lieutenant admiral"), schoutbynacht and konteramiral ("rear admiral"). As names for special positions, there has been: befälhavande amiral ("commanding admiral"), skeppsgårdsamiral ("shipyard admiral"), holmamiral ("islet admiral") and varvsamiral ("shipyard admiral").

Admiral is equivalent to the rank of general in the Swedish Army, the Swedish Air Force, the Swedish Coastal Artillery (until 2000) and as well as in the Swedish Amphibious Corps (from 2000). Historically, during the 20th century, vice admirals were promoted one grade upon retirement to full four-star admiral. The last time this happened was in 1991 when vice admiral Bror Stefenson was promoted to admiral in connection with his retirement from the navy. According to current practice only royals and the Supreme Commander of the Swedish Armed Forces, if he were to come from the Swedish Navy, can hold the rank of a full, four-star, admiral in Sweden.

Following a proposal from the Swedish Armed Forces, the Government of Sweden decides on employment as an admiral.

In everyday speech, admirals of all ranks are addressed as admirals.

== Uniform ==
=== Shoulder mark ===
The shoulder board of a Swedish admiral contains a 45 mm galloon m/51 and four (Note: Four stars has been used for an admiral since 1972. Before that it was three stars.) 25 mm star m/30 in silver embroidery on a white background: The center distance between the stars on the shoulder mark must be 27 mm.

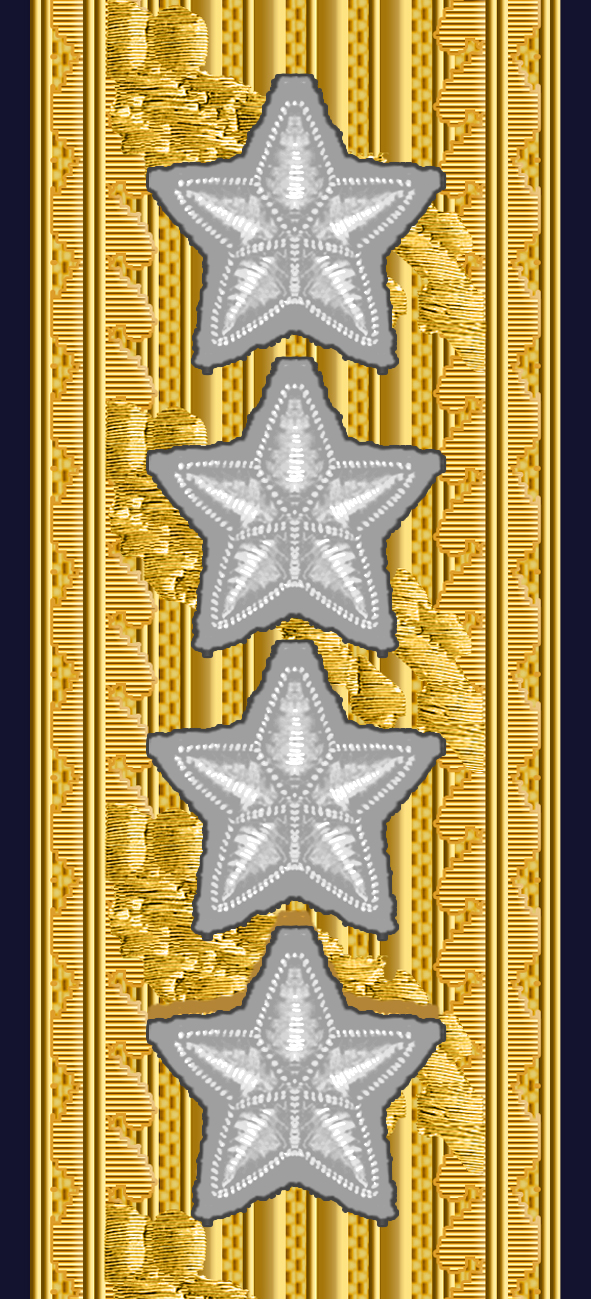
Shoulder board of a Swedish admiral (1972–present)

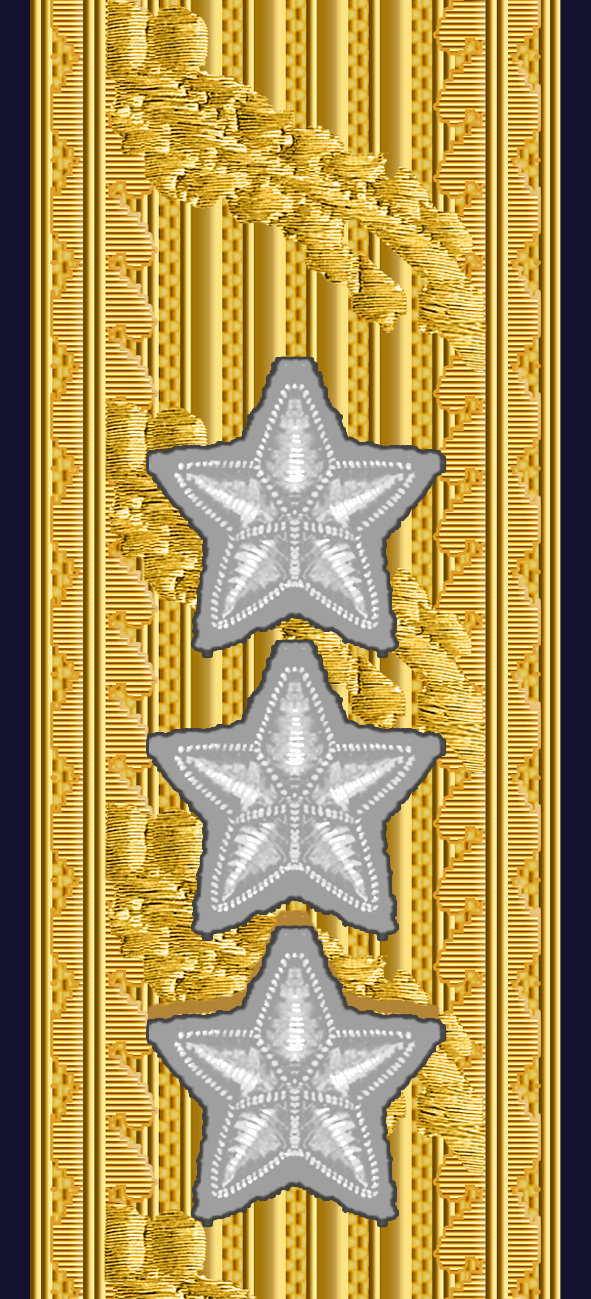
Shoulder board of a Swedish admiral (1878–1972)

=== Sleeve insignia ===
A flag officer wears on the sleeves a 45 mm galloon (GALON M/51 45MM K) and a rank insignia (GRADBETECKNING M/02 TILL ÄRM FLOTTAN) (round loop, the Amphibious Corps has a pointed loop in form of a grenade).

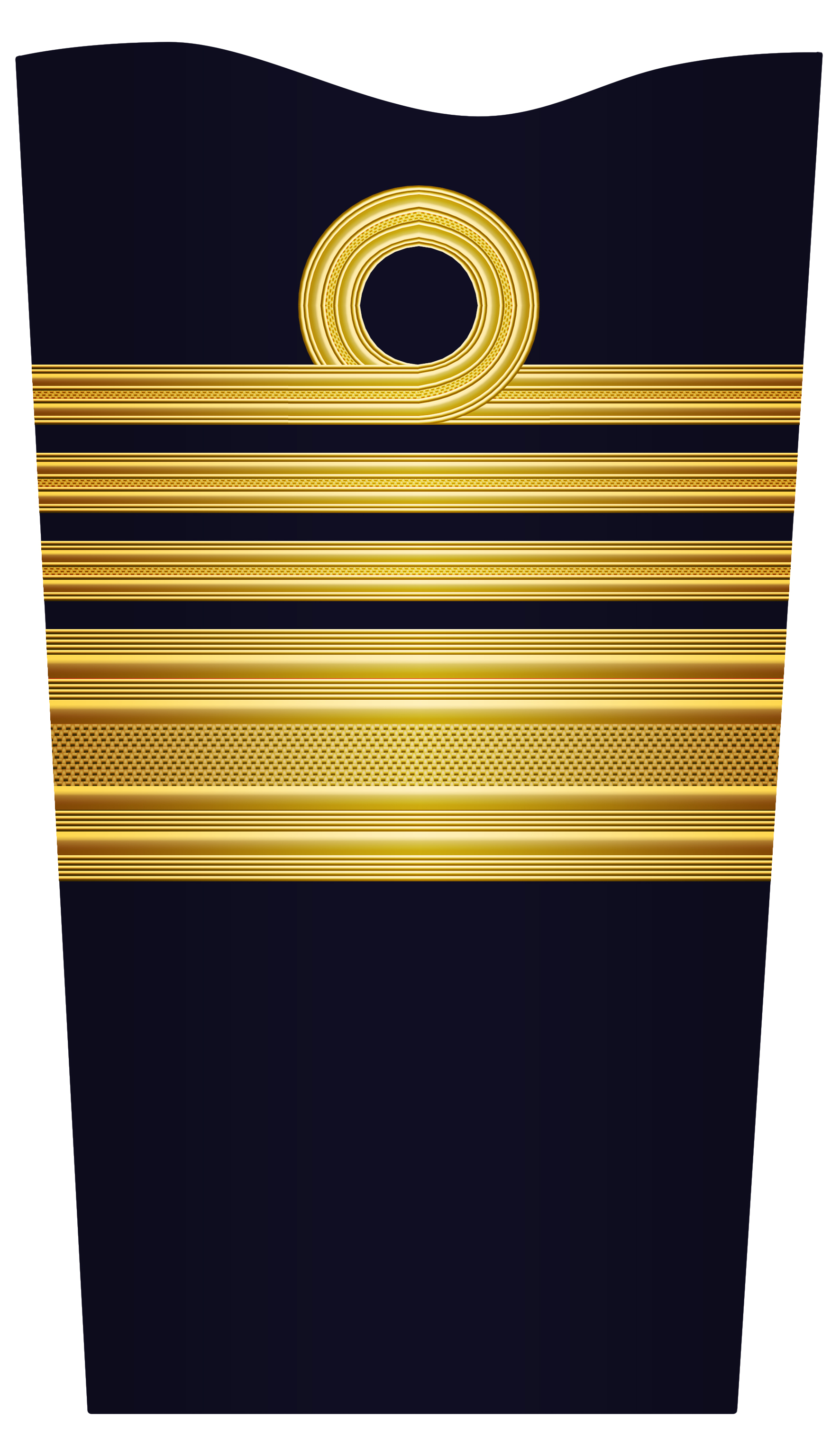
Sleeve insignia for an admiral (2003–present)

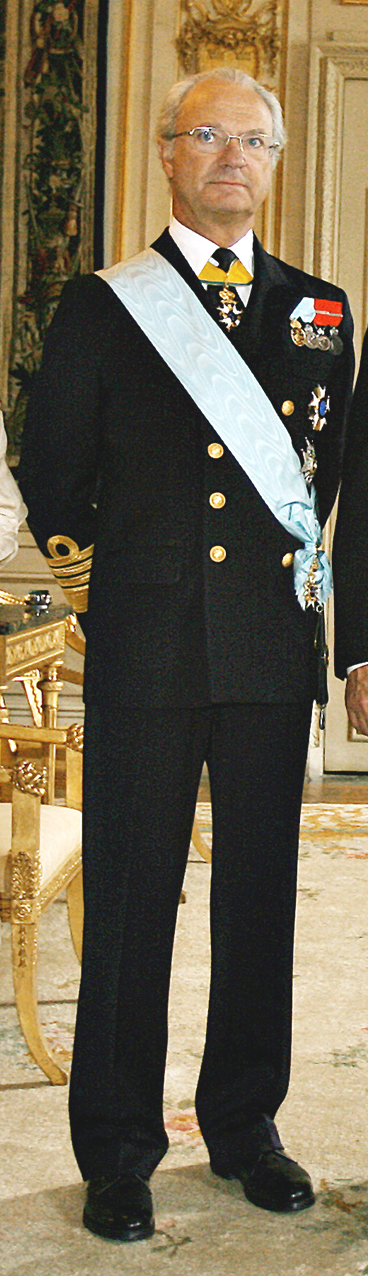
Carl XVI Gustaf with current sleeve insignia for an admiral (2003–present)

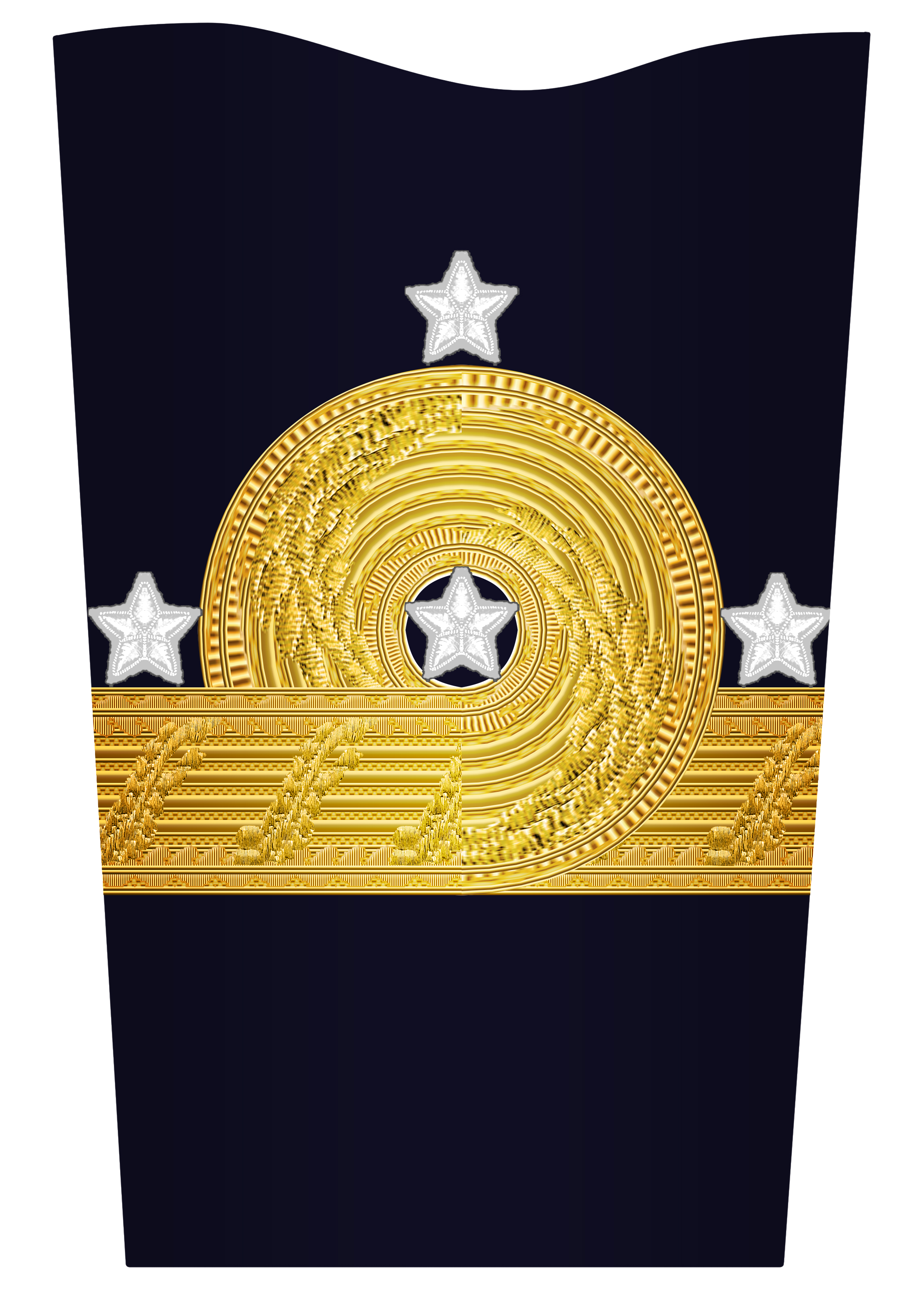
Sleeve insignia for an admiral (1972–2003)

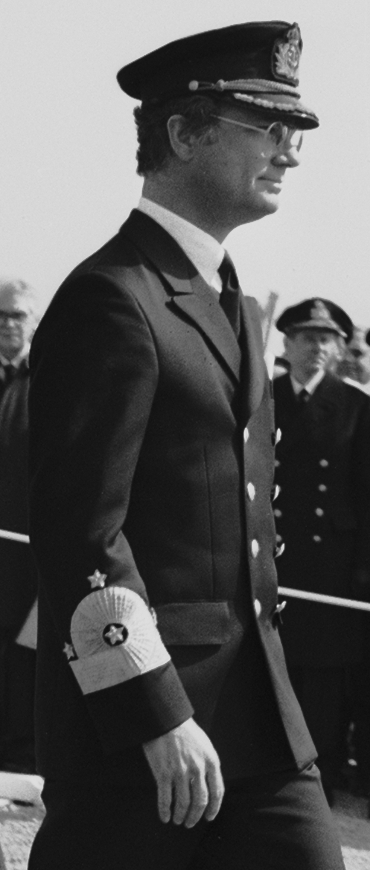
Carl XVI Gustaf with old sleeve insignia for an admiral (1972–2003)

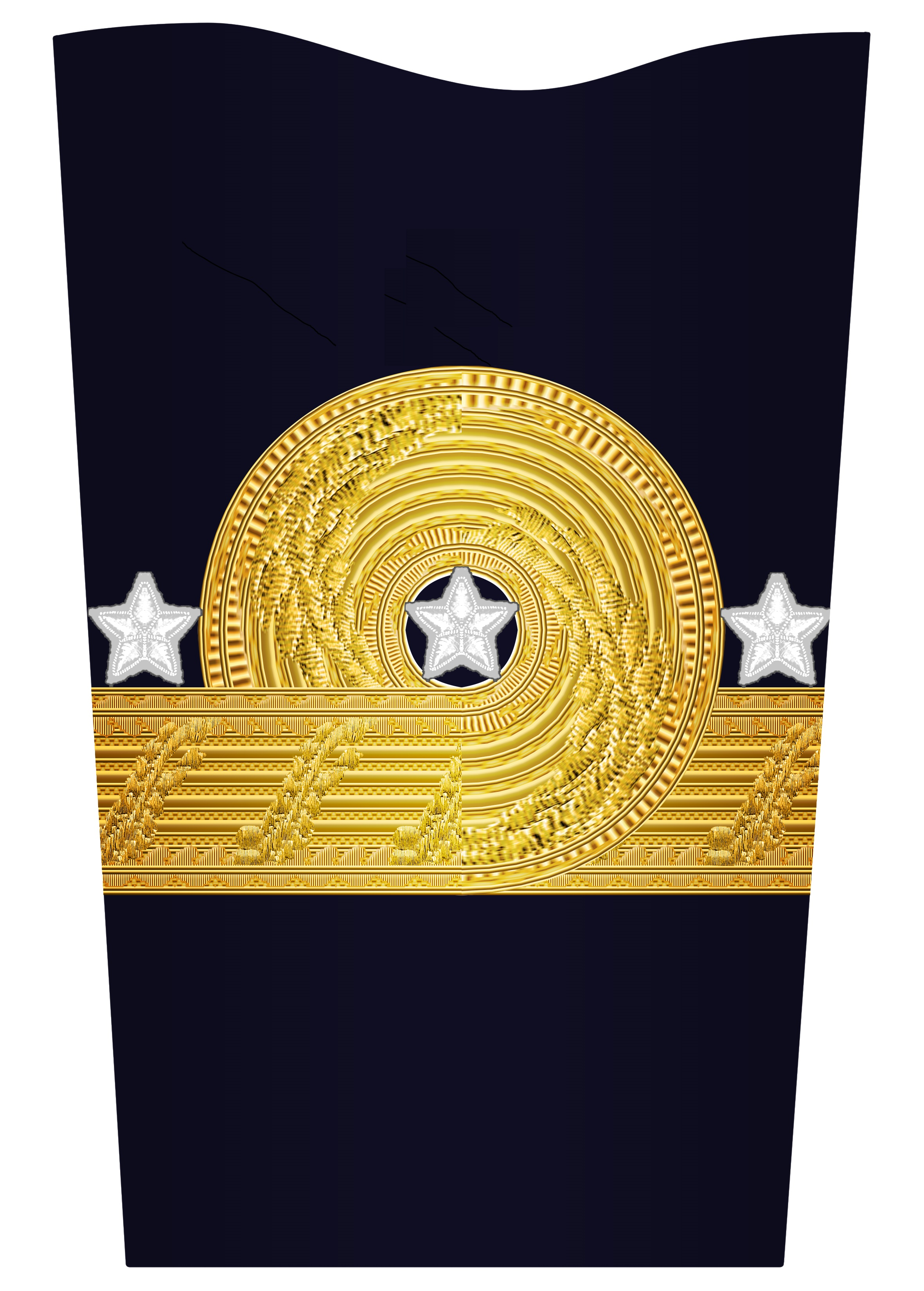
Sleeve insignia for an admiral (1878–1972)

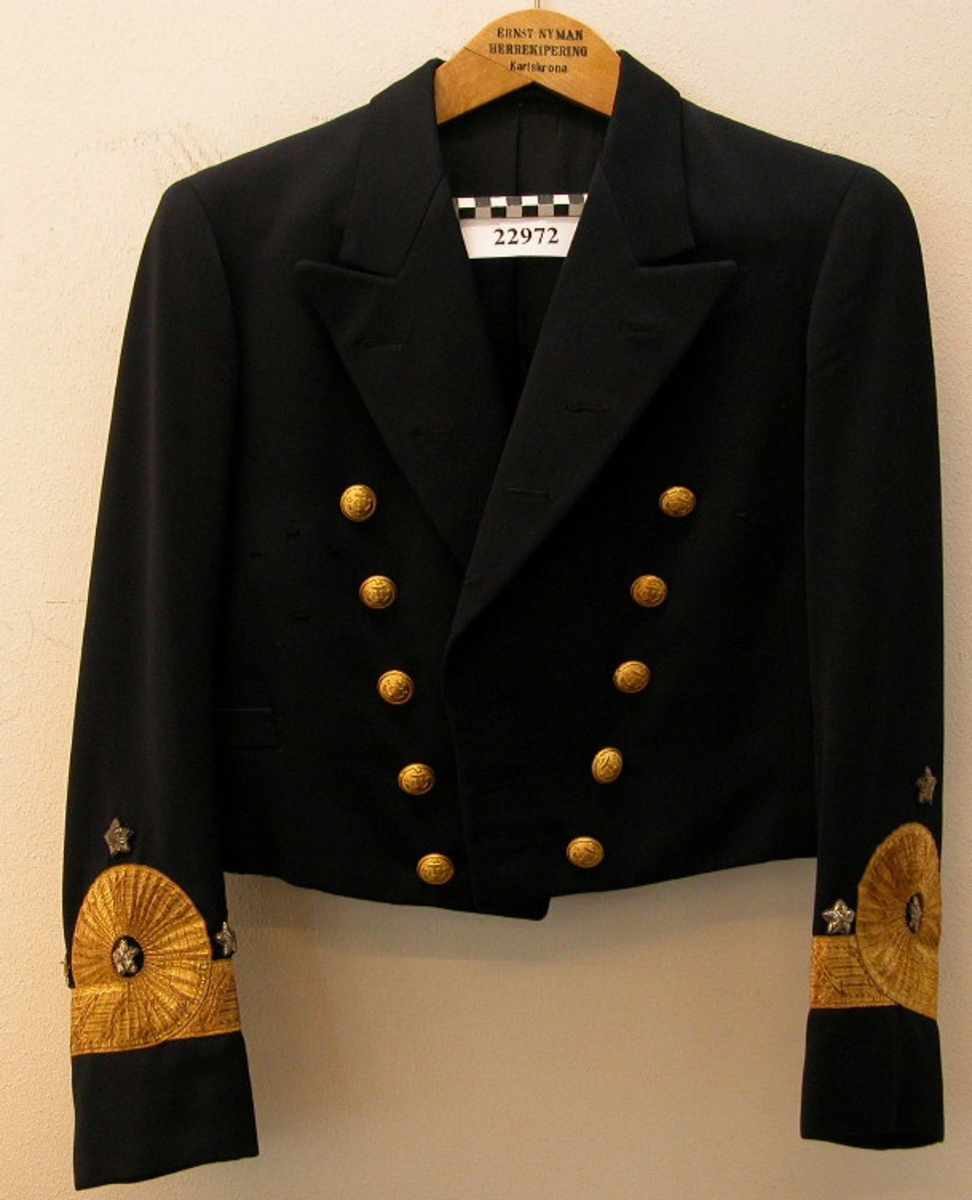
Jacket m/78 (1878) with long trousers and vest for admiral. Has been carried by Admiral Åke Lindemalm.

=== Hats ===
==== Peaked cap ====
A flag officer wears as embellishments a gold embroidered oak leaf wreath (known as scrambled egg) on the visor of the peaked cap (skärmmössa m/48). It also fitted with a hat badge (mössmärke m/78 off för flottan) and with a strap in form of a golden braid.

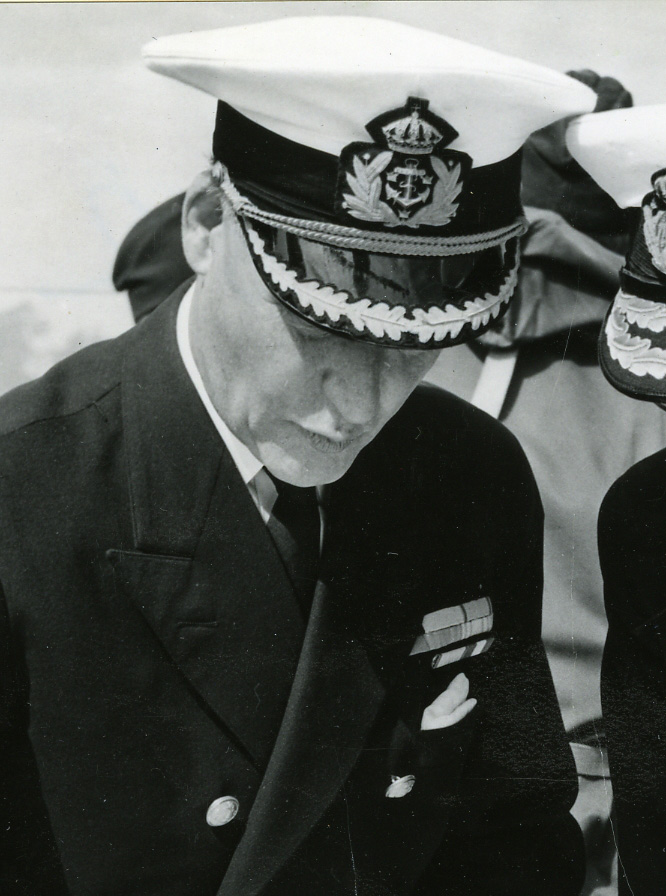
Peaked cap model 1948 worn by Stig H:son Ericson.

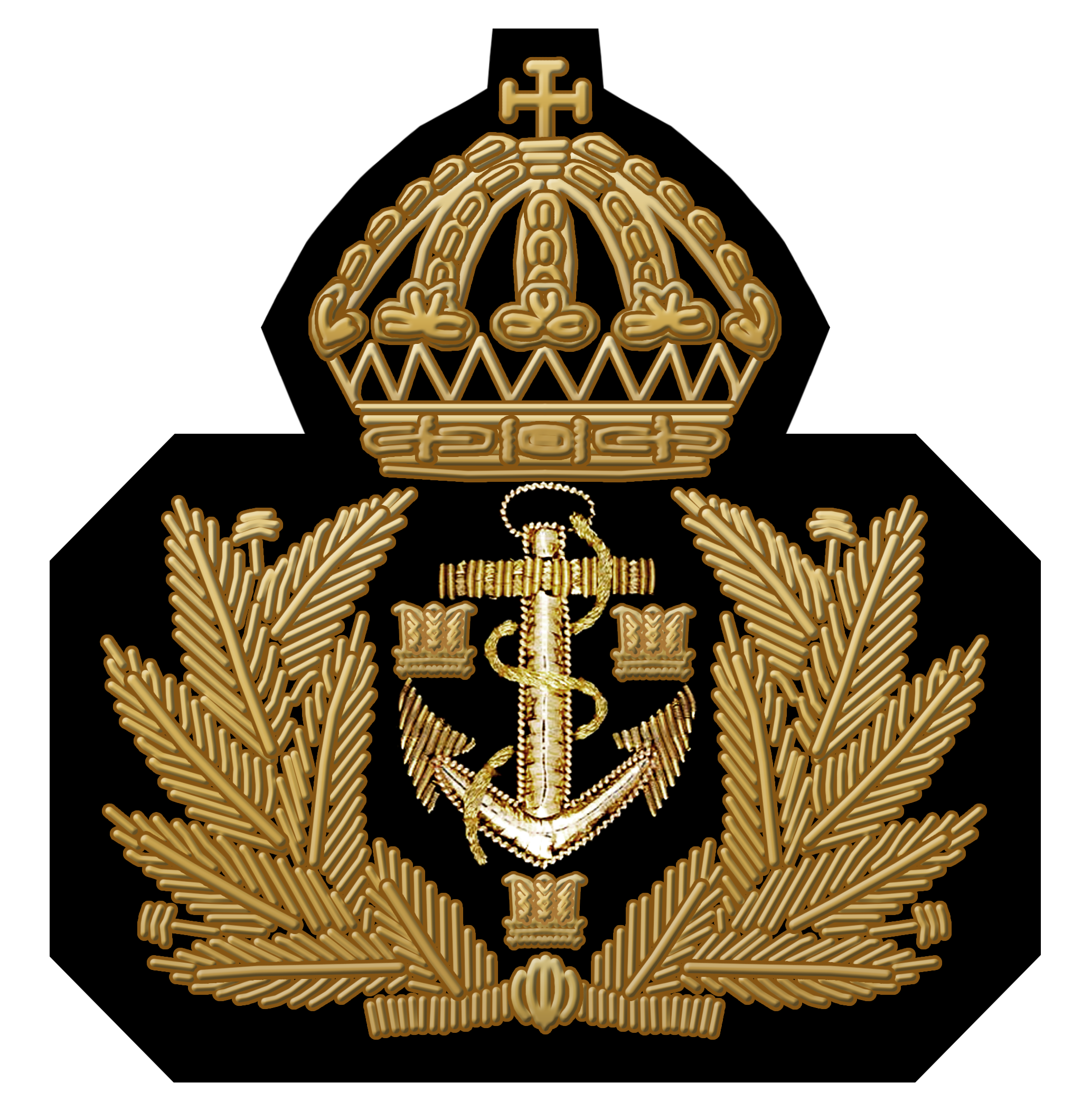
Cap badge

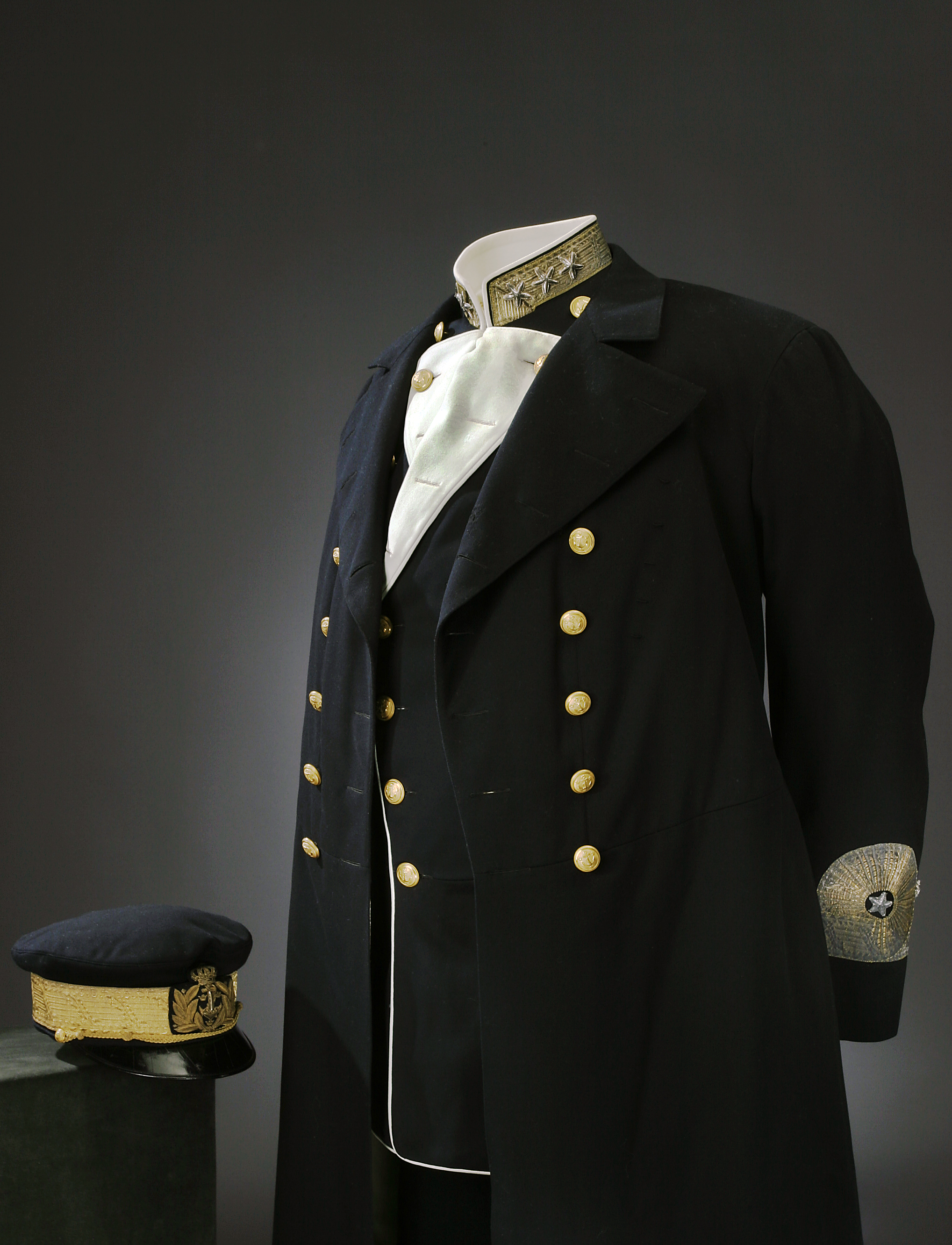
Admiral's uniform. Once owned by King Oscar II and preserved at Livrustkammaren.

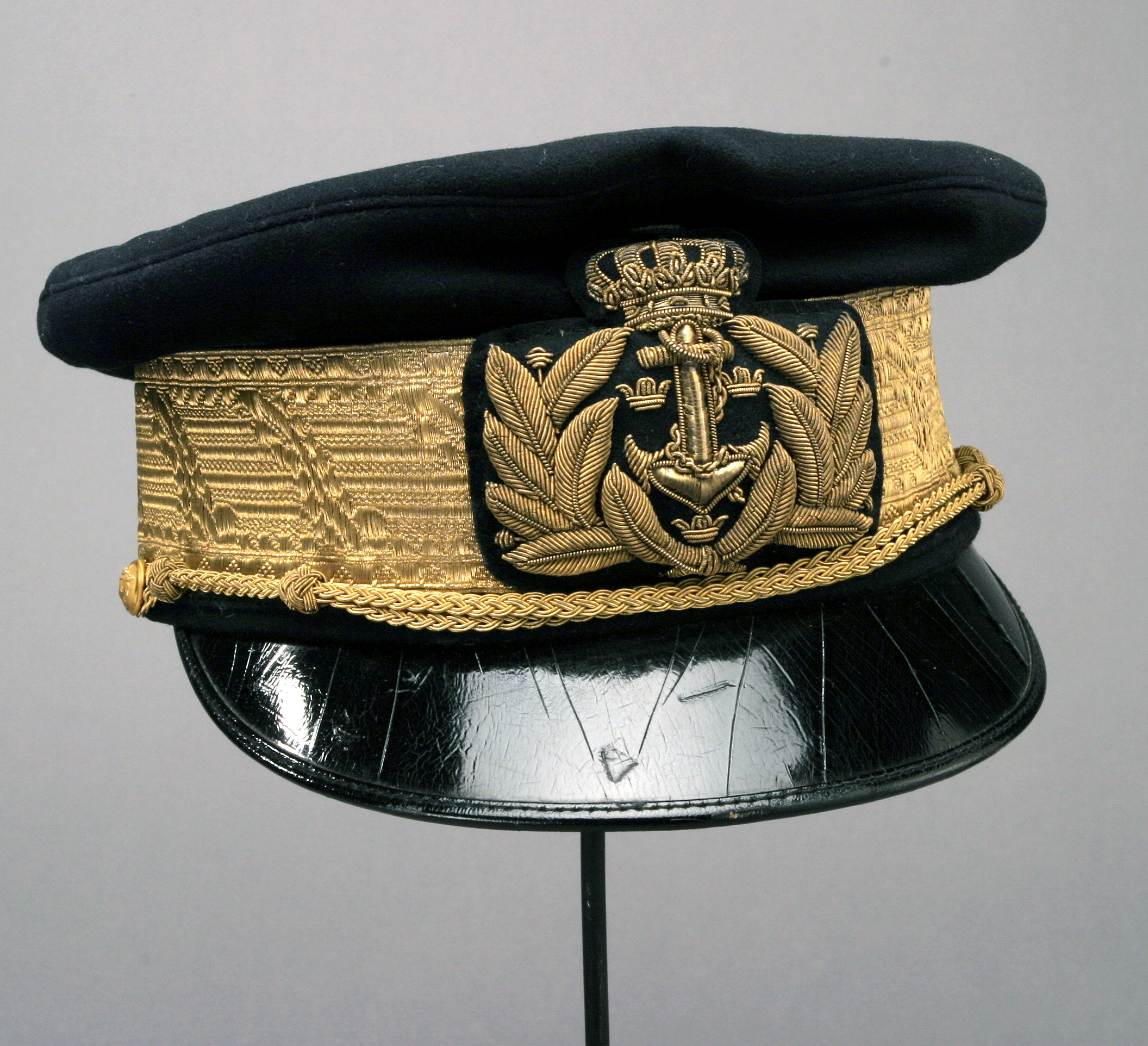
Admiral's peaked cap, once belonging to King Oscar II.

==== Side cap and winter hat ====
An officer wears a hat badge (mössmärke m/78 off) for the navy and another (mössmärke m/87 off) for amphibious units on the side cap (båtmössa m/48) and on the winter hat (vintermössa m/87).

== Personal flags ==
Admiral's command flag, which admirals of all ranks carry on ships, where they are as commanders. On a three-masted ship, an admiral's flag flies on top of the main mast (vice admiral's flies on the top of the fore-mast and rear admiral's on top of the mizzen-mast). The command flag of an admiral (and a general) is a double swallowtailed Swedish flag. In the first blue field 4 five-pointed white stars placed two over two (before 1972 by 3 stars placed one over two).

The flag of the admiral (and vice admiral and rear admiral) is flown on ships of the navy, from which officer of the rank now mentioned exercises his command, or on which he travels in the service, but not on ships on which he is in the capacity of exercise leader.

A flag officer (for example an admiral) who holds the position of Supreme Commander, Chief of Operations, Chief of Navy, Chief of Maritime Component Command or naval force commander, may carry an admiral flag on a car in which the commander in question travels in uniform. On airplanes/helicopters, vice admirals (flag officers) may carry a command sign in the form of an image of an admiral flag.

Admiral/General (Note: The Supreme Commander of the Swedish Armed Forces used admiral's flag since 1942.) command flag (4 stars)
(1972–present)

Admiral/General command flag (3 stars)
(1905–1972)

Admiral command flag
(1875–1905)

Admiral command flag
(1836–1844)

== Gun salute ==
When raising or lowering flags of the commander's, squadron, department or division commander, a gun salute is given with 17 rounds for admiral (15 for vice admiral and 13 for rear admiral).

== List of admirals ==
The following have been promoted to the rank of admiral in the Swedish Navy between 1900 and 2026. This colour indicates that the person was appointed honorary admiral in the Swedish Navy.

Image	Country	Name	Year promoted	Born	Died	Notes	Ref
	(Sweden)	Fredrik von Otter	1900	1833	1910	Prime Minister of Sweden (1900–1902)	
	(Sweden)	Hjalmar af Klintberg	1903	1835	1912	Chief of the Fleet Staff (1889–1903)	
	(United Kingdom)	Edward VII	1905	1841	1910	Honorary Admiral; King of the United Kingdom and the British Dominions, Emperor of India (1901–1910)	
	(Sweden)	Gustaf V	1907	1858	1950	King of Sweden (1907–1950)	
	(Russian Empire)	Nicholas II	1908	1868	1918	Honorary Admiral; Emperor of Russia (1894–1917)	
	(Sweden)	Louis Palander	1910 (Note: Upon retirement.)	1842	1920	Minister for Naval Affairs (1901–1905)	
	(Sweden)	Wilhelm Dyrssen	1923	1858	1929	Commanding Admiral, Stockholm Naval Station (1916–1923)	
	(United Kingdom)	George V	1923	1865	1936	Honorary Admiral; King of the United Kingdom and the British Dominions, Emperor of India (1910–1936)	
	(Sweden)	Carl August Ehrensvärd	1926	1858	1944	Chief of His Majesty's Military Staff (1924–1944)	
	(Sweden)	Henning von Krusenstierna	1927	1862	1933	Chief of the Naval Staff (1916–1927)	
	(Spain)	Alfonso XIII	1927	1886	1941	Honorary Admiral; King of Spain (1886–1931)	
	(Sweden)	Otto Lybeck	1936	1871	1947	Chief of the Naval Staff (1927–1936)	
	(Sweden)	Fabian Tamm	1947	1879	1955	Chief of the Navy (1939–1945)	
	(Denmark)	Frederik IX of Denmark	1947	1899	1972	Honorary Admiral; King of Denmark (1947–1972)	
	(Sweden)	Gustaf VI Adolf	1950	1882	1973	Crown Prince of Sweden (1907–1950); King of Sweden (1950–1973)	
	(United Kingdom)	George VI	1951	1895	1952	Honorary Admiral; King of the United Kingdom and the British Dominions (1936–1952)	
	(Sweden)	Stig H:son Ericson	1961	1897	1985	Chief of the Navy (1953–1961)	
	(Sweden)	Prince Bertil, Duke of Halland	1969	1912	1997	Prince of Sweden (1912–1997)	
	(Sweden)	Åke Lindemalm	1970	1910	2004	Chief of the Navy (1961–1970)	
Carl XVI Gustaf in army uniform	(Sweden)	Carl XVI Gustaf	1973	1946	—	King of Sweden (1973–present)	
	(Sweden)	Bengt Lundvall	1978	1915	2010	Chief of the Navy (1970–1978)	
	(Sweden)	Bror Stefenson	1991	1929	2018	Chief of His Majesty's Military Staff (1990–1997)	

== See also ==
- List of admirals of Sweden
- Military ranks of the Swedish Armed Forces
