= Fleet Staff =

Swedish Navy staff

The Fleet Staff (Swedish: Flottans stab) was a staff in the Swedish Navy created in 1884, that corresponded to the General Staff in the Swedish Army. It consisted of a commander with the rank of flag officer or captain, as well as a number of officers (17 in 1907) from the Swedish Navy and the Swedish Coastal Artillery, who were assigned to serve on the staff. The Fleet Staff's tasks included developing plans for the mobilization of the navy and handling issues related to the maintenance and use of naval forces; monitoring and proposing training and exercises for the personnel; monitoring the development of naval warfare both within and outside the country; conducting research in naval warfare history, drafting necessary regulations, and similar tasks; and conducting investigations in maritime military matters. The Fleet Staff was renamed on 31 December 1907 and became the Naval Staff.

== History ==
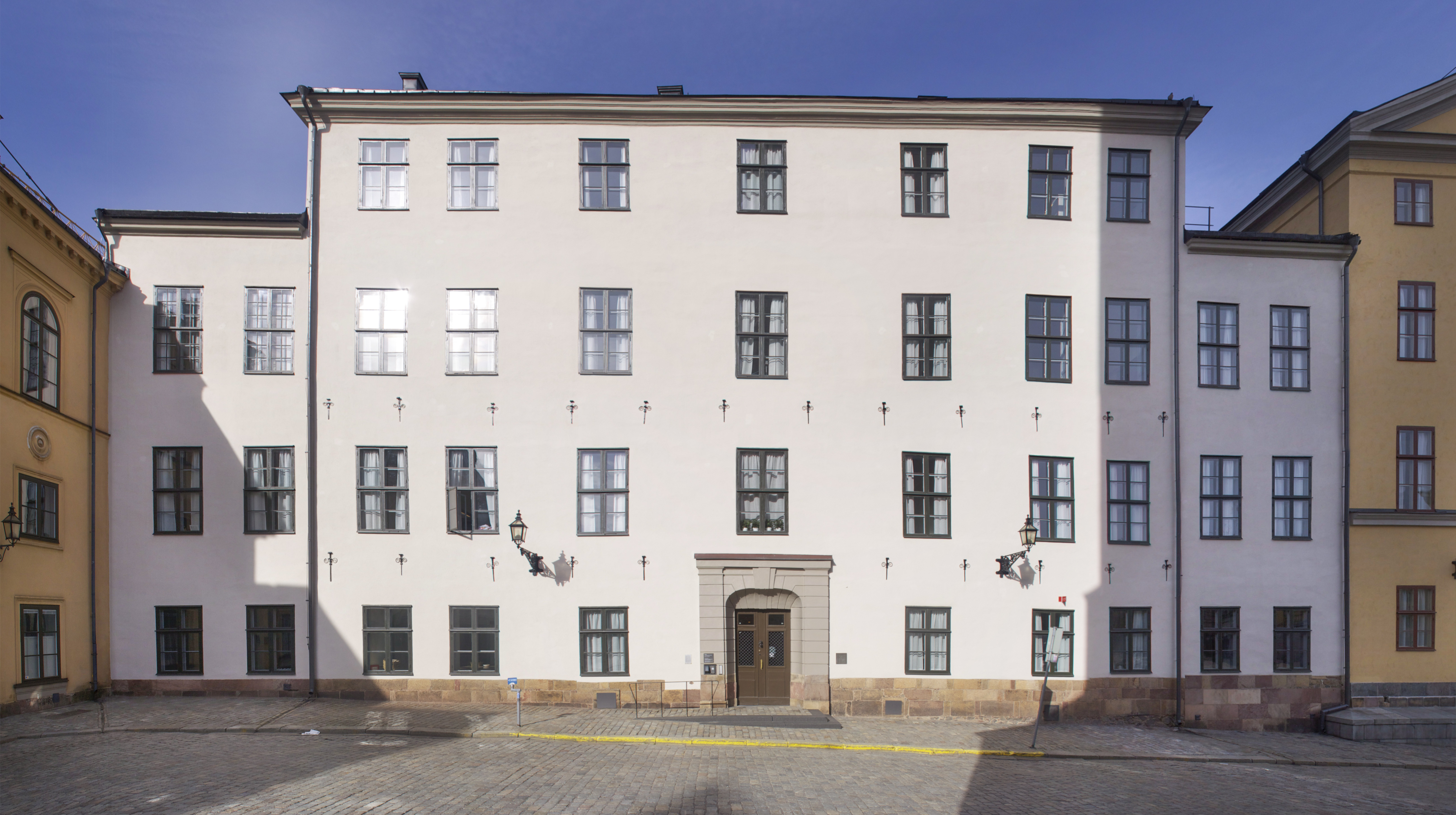
The Fleet Staff was located in this building at Birger Jarls torg 11, Riddarholmen from 1886 to 1899.

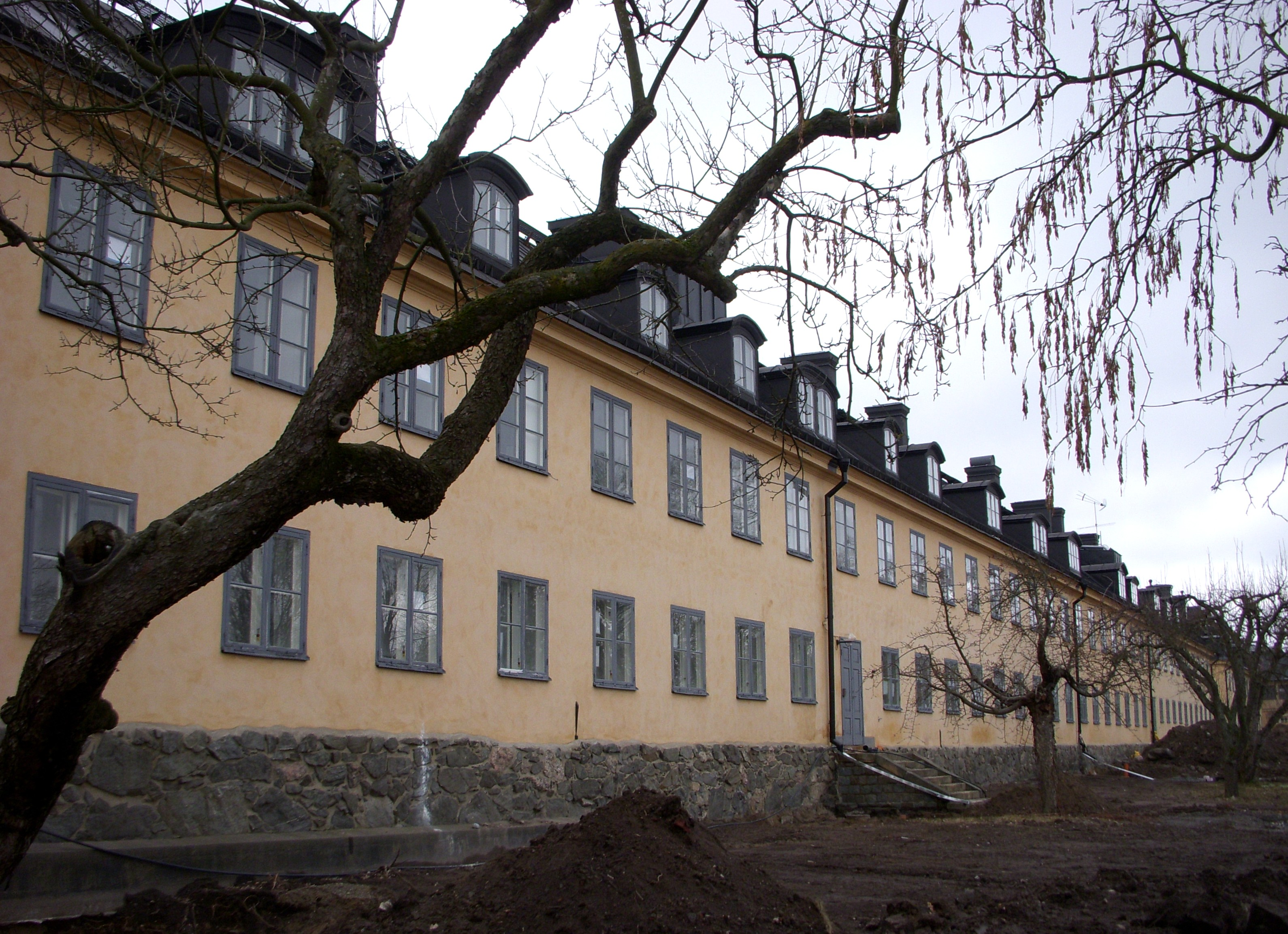
It was located in this building at Långa raden 4, Skeppsholmen from 1899 to 1907.

Through his so-called General Adjutant's Instruction, King Gustav III also established a general staff within the Swedish Navy. According to the general order of 1805 and the letters patent of 1806, the navy's general staff would consist of all flag officers, adjutants general, senior and staff adjutants within the naval forces. The Fleet Staff was subsequently composed of the officers serving in the Ministry for Naval Affairs's military office (kommandoexpedition), as well as flag captains and adjutants to the admiral. Following a proposal submitted by the 1882 Committee for the Arrangement of the Navy that the office of Chief of the Navy's Military Personnel (Chefens för flottans militärpersonal) should be revoked and staff matters handed over to the military office and to the member of the Royal Swedish Naval Materiel Administration who had to prepare and present military matters, this question was included in the bill to the Riksdag of 1883, in which it was questioned that instead of the Chief of the Navy's Military Personnel, a senior officer would be appointed as Chief of the Fleet Staff to assist the Minister for Naval Affairs in purely military matters. The issue was first resolved at the Riksdag of 1884, at which time the then cabinet minister and head of the Ministry for Naval Affairs, Rear Admiral, later Vice Admiral, Baron Carl Gustaf von Otter, obtained the Riksdag's consent. In 1884, regulations were laid down regarding the formation of the Fleet Staff, whose main task would be to maintain and develop the naval warfare within the navy, collect and process intelligence on other countries' naval forces, draw up plans for naval mobilization and use, and so on.

According to the organization, the head of the Ministry for Naval Affairs in purely military matters was to be assisted, in addition to the military office, also by a senior officer as Chief of the Fleet Staff appointed by the King in Council. The first Chief of the Fleet Staff was the Rear Admiral, later the Vice Admiral, Carl Philip Virgin, who was also the last holder of the post of Chief of the Navy's Military Personnel.

The new Chief of the Fleet Staff was appointed at the same time to be Inspector of the Navy's Practical Exercises (Inspektör för flottans praktiska övningar). In accordance with the instructions issued to the Inspector of the Navy's Practical Exercises on 10 July 1884, the King in Council wished to appoint to this post an officer of the rank of flag officer or captain, with the task of carrying out inspection partly of the fleet's annual summer exercises at the end of them, partly of each particular navy vessel upon its return from the completed naval expedition and partly in the event of the navy's teaching facilities. Initially, the Fleet Staff included, in addition to serving officers, commander and adjutants in the Ministry for Naval Affairs's military office, department heads in the Royal Swedish Naval Materiel Administration's artillery, naval mine and commissary departments serving in the Naval Materiel Administration, commanding officers and captains of the fleet and flag adjutants. This system, that certain personnel were counted as a staff member by virtue of their office, but had their regular service elsewhere, ceased with the 1884 instruction for the Fleet Staff, according to which the staff became a separate institution with its special, commanded and serving personnel there. Through the 1884 Instruction of the Chief of the Fleet Staff, this staff was created into an institution, which it was incumbent upon to take full initiative in the measures which might be found necessary or expedient for the efficiency of the navy. On 1 October 1884, a special Chief of the Fleet Staff was appointed. The staff did not receive a permanent organization until 1 October 1896.

When the staff began its operations, it received premises in the so-called Sparreska palatset at Birger Jarls torg 11 on Riddarholmen in Stockholm, which had previously been available to the Chief of the Navy's Military Personnel. Both the Ministry for Naval Affairs and the Royal Swedish Naval Materiel Administration's office premises were housed in the same building, so all the naval supreme governing bodies there were gathered under one roof, which resulted in time savings and simplification in case preparation and processing. Upon Virgin's resignation as chief of staff in 1889, the position of Inspector of the Navy's Practical Exercises was revoked.

The experience from the staff's first ten years of operations had shown the need for the division of work into organized departments. The first departments within the staff were in 1896 the Mobilization and Statistics Department as well as the Communication Department. According to the proclamation issued in 1896 concerning the organization and activities of the staff in peacetime, the staff would have the task of: drawing up plans for the mobilization of the navy and dealing with matters concerning the navy's enabling to fulfill its task; to pay close attention to the training, exercises and serviceability of the navy personnel and to make suggestions for improvements in these respects; to closely monitor the development of the naval warfare both within Sweden and outside the country and to carry out naval history research; to prepare, after receiving the assignment, the necessary statutes, regulations, instructions and guidelines for the service in the navy; to carry out investigations and issue statements on naval matters, which are referred to the staff, and to collect all necessary information concerning both naval personnel and equipment as well as maritime communications as well as such institutions within the country, which are intended for the promotion of general shipping. When the space within the property on Birger Jarls torg 11 became insufficient, the Fleet Staff was assigned a premises at Långa raden 4 on Skeppsholmen. Due to the creation of the Swedish Coastal Artillery, the name of the staff was changed from 31 December 1907 to the Naval Staff.

== Commanding officers ==
No.	Portrait	Chief of the Fleet Staff	Took office	Left office	Time in office	Defence branch	Minister for Naval Affairs	Ref.
1	Philip Virgin [sv]	Rear admiral Philip Virgin (1824–1906)	1884	1889	4–5 years	Navy	Carl Gustaf von Otter	
2	Hjalmar af Klintberg [sv]	Vice admiral (Note: af Klintberg was captain when taking office on 10 May 1889 and was promoted to rear admiral on 9 November 1894 and to vice admiral on 31 December 1900 while still in office.); Hjalmar af Klintberg (1835–1912)	10 May 1889	30 September 1903	14 years, 143 days	Navy	Carl Gustaf von Otter; Jarl Christerson; Gerhard Dyrssen; Louis Palander	
3	Otto Lindbom [sv]	Rear admiral Otto Lindbom (1846–1905)	1903	1905	1–2 years	Navy	Louis Palander	
4	Ludvig Sidner [sv]	Rear admiral Ludvig Sidner (1851–1917)	20 June 1905	6 November 1905	139 days	Navy	Arvid Lindman	
