= Fredrik von Otter =

Swedish friherre, naval officer and politician

His Excellency, Friherre Fredrik von Otter
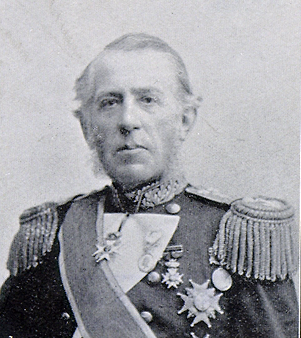

Prime Minister of Sweden
- In office 12 September 1900 – 5 July 1902
- Monarch: Oscar II
- Preceded by: Erik Gustaf Boström
- Succeeded by: Erik Gustaf Boström

Personal details
- Born: Fredrik Wilhelm von Otter; 11 April 1833 Töreboda, Sweden
- Died: 9 March 1910 (aged 76) Karlskrona, Sweden
- Resting place: Norra begravningsplatsen
- Party: Independent
- Spouse: Matilda Dahlström

Military service
- Branch/service: Swedish Navy
- Years of service: 1850–1900
- Rank: Admiral
- Awards: Order of the Sword

Baron Fredrik Wilhelm von Otter (11 April 1833 – 9 March 1910) was a Swedish statesman and military officer who served as Prime Minister of Sweden from 1900 to 1902. He previously served as Minister for Naval Affairs from 1874 to 1880. During his tenure, Von Otter oversaw the introduction of universal conscription and sought moderate reforms of the electoral system. He is remembered as a technocratic and pragmatic leader during Sweden’s transition toward parliamentary rule.

== Life and work ==
Otter was born on the Fimmersta estate (Töreboda Municipality) in Västergötland and belonged to the wealthy and aristocratic von Otter family. He entered the Royal Swedish Navy as second lieutenant at the age of 17, but remained without promotion for a long time. Meanwhile, he served in the British Royal Navy from 1857 to 1861, participating in campaigns against pirates in the South China Sea, and took part in one of Adolf Erik Nordenskiöld's North Pole expeditions in 1868, as commander of the expedition ship Sofia. He was promoted to commander and made aide-de-camp of Crown Prince Oscar, the Duke of Östergötland, in 1872 and remained so after the prince's accession to the throne as Oscar II in 1873.

In 1874 he was promoted to captain and appointed Ministry for Naval Affairs in the cabinet, succeeding Major General Baron Abraham Leijonhufvud. He remained in this position until the resignation of the De Geer cabinet in 1880, after which he was appointed director of the naval shipyard in Karlskrona. He was made a Commodore in 1884, a vice admiral in 1892 and admiral in 1900.

He also represented Blekinge County in the parliamentary First Chamber 1891–1899, and Karlskrona in the Second Chamber 1900–1902.

After the resignation of Erik Gustaf Boström in 1900, Otter was offered the premiership by the king and formed a cabinet which would remain in office for two years. As Prime Minister he was responsible for carrying through the remodelling of the military system and the final abolition of the allotment system introduced by Charles XI more than 200 years earlier. In connection with the new military organization, a progressive taxation system was introduced. After the end of that parliamentary session in July 1902, Otter resigned and was succeeded by his predecessor Boström.

== Personal life ==
On 7 October 1863 in Stockholm, von Otter married Mathilda Dahlström (23 January 1841 – 24 June 1926), the daughter of county governor Jacob Axel Dahlström and Christina Hagerman.

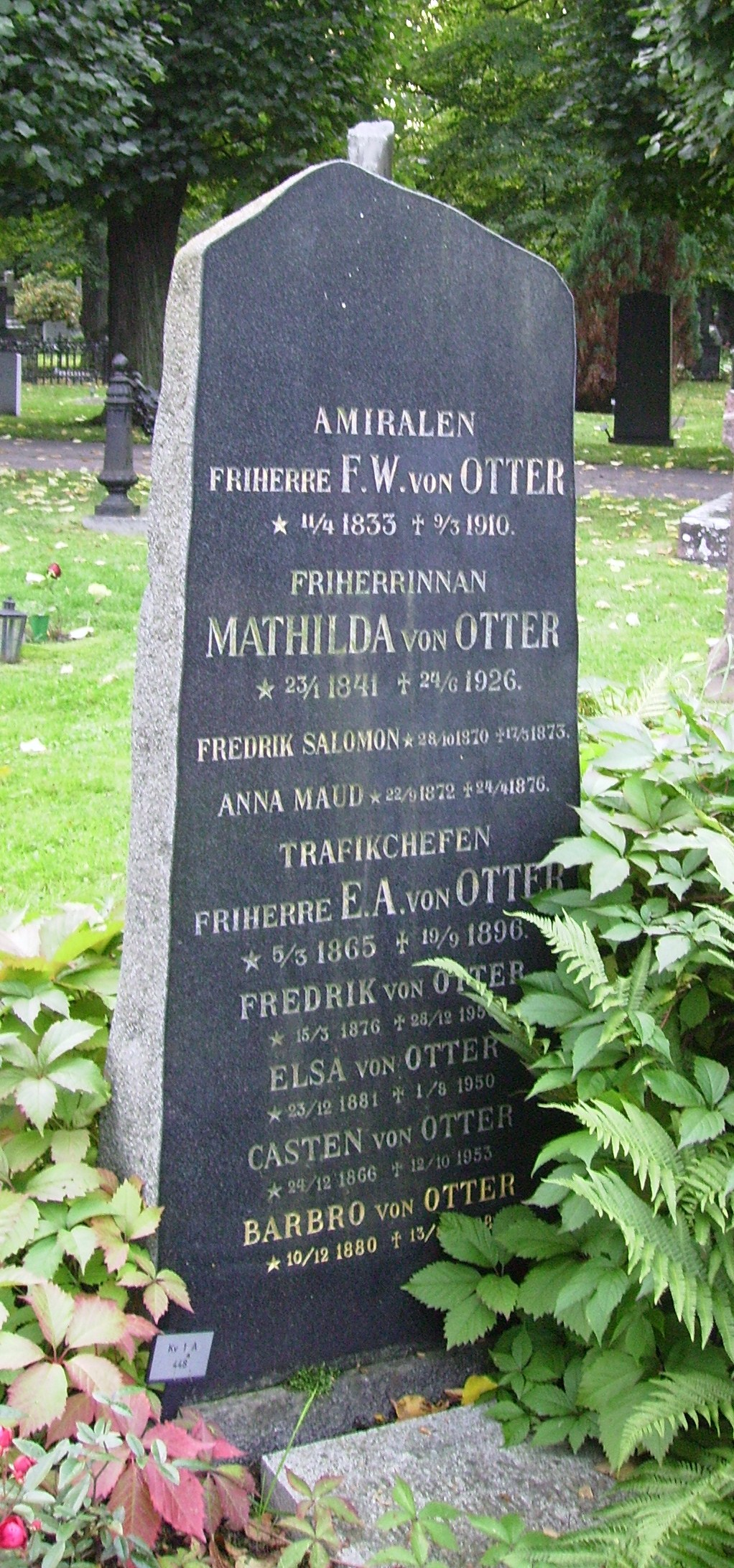
Fredrik von Otter's grave at Norra begravningsplatsen

== Dates of rank ==
- 21 December 1850 – Sekundlöjtnant
- 15 June 1858 – Premiärlöjtnant
- 1 October 1866 – Lieutenant
- 5 April 1872 – Lieutenant commander
- ? – Commander
- 23 December 1874 – Captain
- 12 September 1884 – Rear admiral
- 16 December 1892 – Vice admiral
- 8 September 1900 – Admiral

== Honours ==
- Member of the Royal Swedish Academy of War Sciences (1874)
- Member of the Royal Swedish Society of Naval Sciences (1865)
- Honorary member of the Royal Swedish Society of Naval Sciences (1875)

Political offices
Preceded by Abraham Leijonhufvud	Minister for Naval Affairs; 1874–1880	Succeeded by Carl-Gustaf von Otter
Preceded by Erik Gustaf Boström	Prime Minister of Sweden; 1900–1902	Succeeded by Erik Gustaf Boström
