= Proposed Anglo-Swedish Antarctic Expedition 1915–1920 =

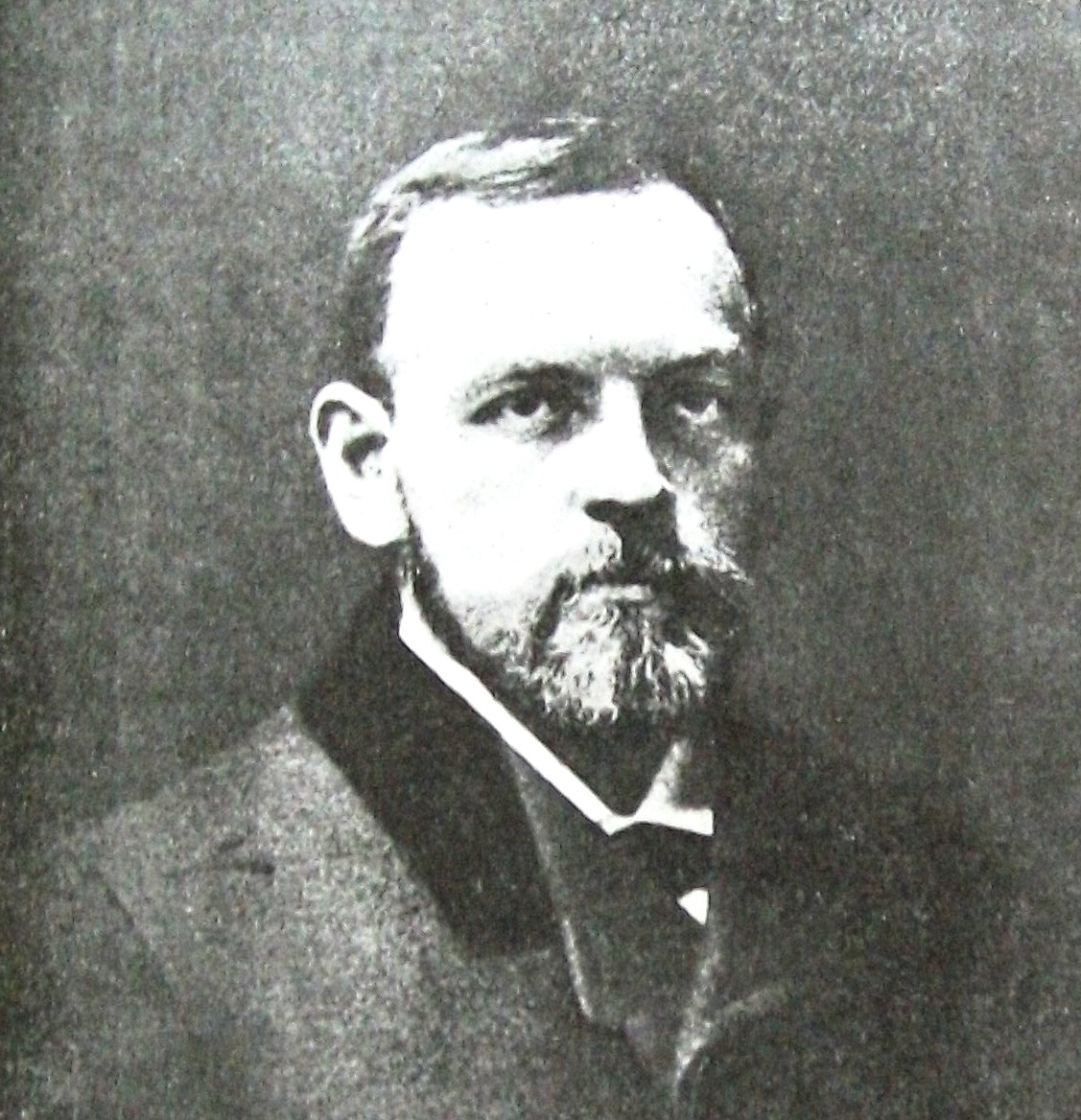
Otto Nordenskjöld, prime mover in the Anglo-Swedish project

Between 1912 and 1914, plans were discussed between proponents in Sweden and Britain for a joint Anglo-Swedish Antarctic Expedition. The impetus for this enterprise came from the geologist and explorer Otto Nordenskjöld, who had led the 1901–1903 Swedish Antarctic Expedition He wished to continue and extend the work begun there. The British involvement in the new venture arose because Nordenskjöld planned to finance it from the profits of a whaling company which he proposed to set up. For this, he needed to obtain a licence from the British authorities, who controlled all whaling activities in the sector of the Antarctic in which Nordenskjöld intended to operate.

The British would not grant the licence, because of their concern that the resource was being over-worked. They did, however, have a close interest in further researches into whales and whaling. The Swedish and British representatives discussed how this concern could be combined with the Swedes' more general interests in biological, geological and meteorological investigations. A plan emerged for the establishment of a scientific station that would be manned for five years by a team of British and Swedish scientists, funded equally from British and Swedish sources. The Swedish government was supportive of this plan, and promised the required finance. In Britain the government was more reticent, partly because it was pursuing other avenues for the development of whaling research, and also because it was unenthusiastic about funding further Antarctic expeditions. Consequently, much of the British share of the finance for the Anglo–Swedish expedition had to be secured from learned societies. Nordenskjöld had achieved some success in obtaining contributions, before the outbreak of the First World War in August 1914 led to the postponement and eventual cancellation of the project. Many years later, a part-revival of the plan led to the Norwegian–British–Swedish Antarctic Expedition of 1949–52.

== Background: the first Swedish Antarctic expedition ==
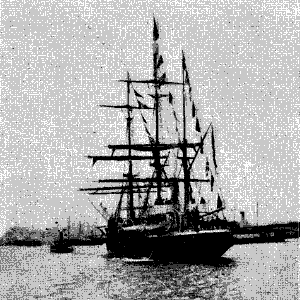
The Antarctic, Swedish Antarctic Expedition ship 1901–03

In 1901 Otto Nordenskjöld, a 31-year-old geologist and university lecturer, led the first Swedish Antarctic Expedition, one of several ventures heading for the then largely unexplored Antarctic continent at the beginning of the 20th century. (Note: Concurrent major Antarctic expeditions included: Robert Falcon Scott's Discovery Expedition 1901–04, Erich von Drygalski's Gauss expedition 1901–1903, and William Speirs Bruce's Scottish National Antarctic Expedition 1902–1904.) Nordenskjöld had previous field experience in Tierra del Fuego, Alaska and Greenland, and had an excellent family pedigree; his uncle, Adolf Erik Nordenskiöld, had won fame for his completion of the first navigation of the Northeast Passage in 1878–79. The 1901 expedition was funded by private contributions and loans, having failed to secure financial support from the state. In February 1902 Nordenskjöld and a small group of scientists established a base at Snow Hill Island, to the east of Graham Land, while the expedition ship Antarctic carried out survey and other work further north. The following season, when Antarctic returned south to pick up the shore party, she became trapped in the ice and was finally crushed and sunk on 14 February 1903. Her crew escaped to nearby Paulet Island, and the two parts of the expedition each endured a second polar winter in harsh conditions, before both groups were rescued by the Argentine gunboat Uruguay in November 1903.

In difficult circumstances the expedition achieved significant scientific results, despite its eclipse in most polar histories by the more glamourised exploits of Scott, Shackleton and others. On his return to Sweden, Nordenskjöld continued with his academic career, being appointed professor of geology at the University of Gothenburg, and carried out field assignments in Finnmark, Spitsbergen and Greenland. Amid these various activities, he was eager to return to the Antarctic, to complete and extend the work of the earlier expedition, and together with Johan Gunnar Andersson, his second-in-command during the 1901 expedition, he sought the means to do so.

== Negotiations for a whaling licence ==
Map showing the territory claimed by Britain as within the Falkland Island Dependencies (South Georgia is off the map)

In April 1911, addressing the Swedish Society for Anthropology and Geography, Nordenskjöld outlined a scheme for a second Antarctic expedition, based on the establishment of a scientific station that would operate over a period of several years. He included in his argument an appeal to nationalism, the desire to restore Sweden to the top ranks of scientific polar exploration. The question of how such a long-term scheme could be financed was a major issue for Nordenskjöld, bearing in mind the funding difficulties that all prospective expeditions faced, and his state of personal indebtedness arising from the financing of the first expedition. The solution, he decided, was to set up a commercial whaling company to operate in the area of the expedition, the profits from which would fund the scientific research. The 1901–03 expedition had noted the abundance of whales in that area; Carl Anton Larsen, the captain of the Antarctic, had seen the commercial possibilities for whaling there, and had founded an industry which, Nordenskjöld noted in 1914, had developed to the extent that 40 vessels were now employed, producing a yield that over the years had amounted to £2 million.

The establishment of a whaling company would not be a straightforward matter. In 1908 the British government had issued Letters Patent claiming sovereignty over this area of the Antarctic, declaring that South Georgia, the South Shetlands and Graham Land were part of the Falkland Island Dependencies (FID). As a result, whaling activities in the area were now subject to British Colonial Office control, through the granting of a licence which, Nordenskjöld was aware, might not easily be obtained. Nevertheless, he and Andersson hoped that with support from leading geographers and polar experts, the difficulty might be overcome. With this in mind they approached Sir John Scott Keltie, secretary of the Royal Geographical Society (RGS). Keltie was encouraging; he thought that the proposed scheme for a long-term scientific station was "the kind of exploration we now want in the Antarctic", and considered it would be not too difficult to get the government's agreement to the granting of a whaling licence. A draft application to the Colonial Office, submitted to the RGS for consideration, made the point that it was as a result of the 1901–03 Swedish expedition that whaling had become established in the area. The proposed whaling company would not only provide funding to support the scientific station, but would enable the creation of a fund for to support further research, greatly to the benefit of Antarctic whaling.

However, when Nordenskjöld and Andersson visited London and met Colonial Office officials, the outcome was disappointing. The government, they were informed, prompted by advice from the Natural History Museum (NHM), was concerned about possible overfishing and was considering introducing further measures for the protection of whales. In the meantime, no further licences for whaling would be issued. (Note: Other grounds for opposing the application were raised by the Colonial Office's whaling expert Rowland Darnley, who had doubts about its purely scientific motives and was concerned that there was "no guarantee that the scientists were not in league with the financiers".) Faced with this setback, Nordenskjöld and Andersson nevertheless felt that if they could convince the NHM of the merits of their plan, they might yet overcome the Colonial Office's objection. They approached Sidney Harmer, the museum's Keeper of Zoology, who after considering their proposal, thought it might provide a practical means for the necessary research into protection of whales: "The information that would be gained thereby", he wrote in June 1912, "is so important that it would probably more than compensate for the number of whales killed". Others were less convinced, and when later that year the museum was invited to participate in a government commission to investigate whaling policy, Harmer backtracked. In February 1913 he informed Nordenskjöld and Andersson that he could no longer support their licence application.

== Revised scheme ==
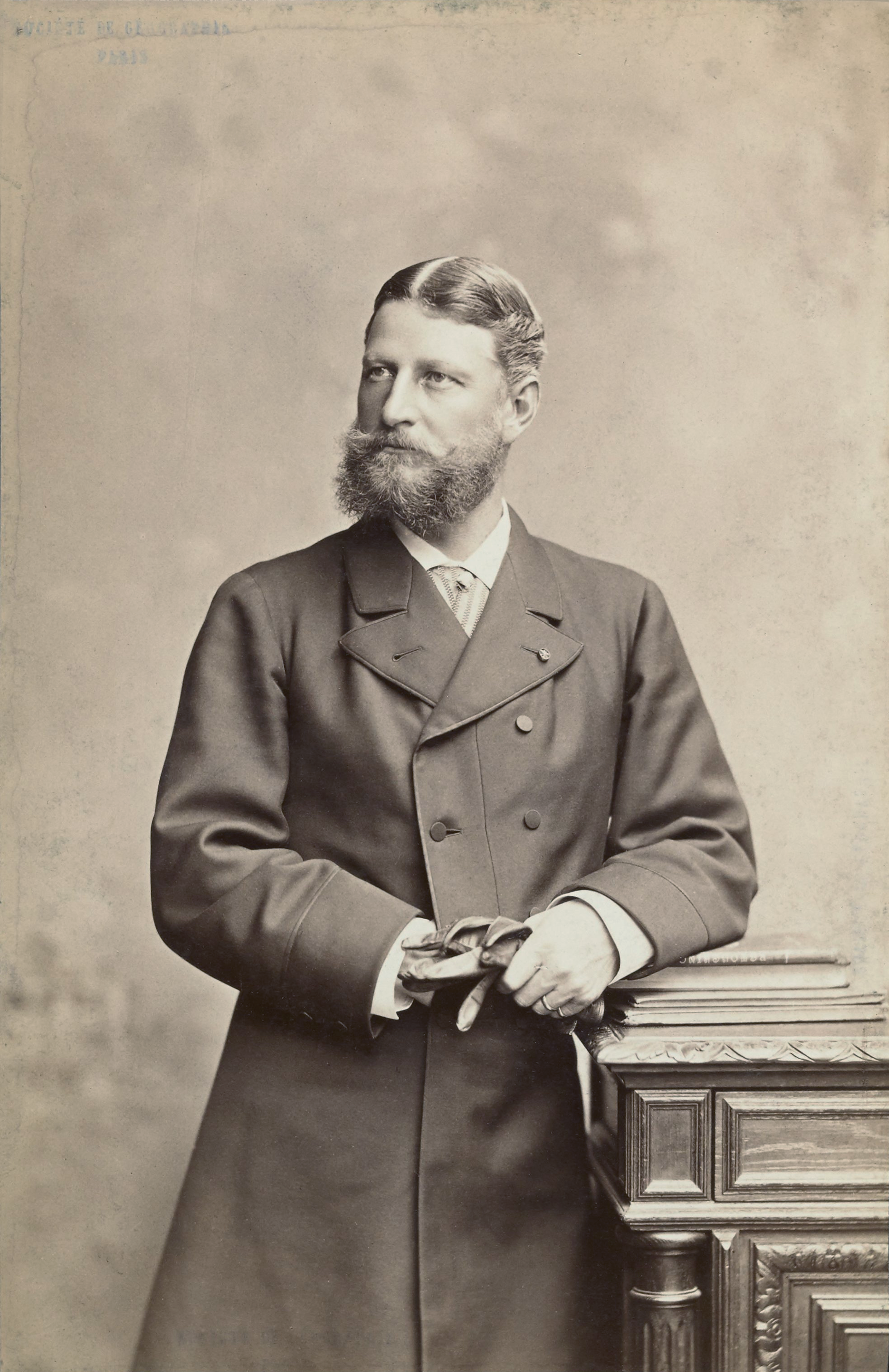
Louis Palander

Thwarted in their desire to base a new Swedish expedition on the revenues from a whaling venture, Nordenskjöld and Andersson devised an alternative strategy: a joint Anglo-Swedish project with shared costs, in which a five-year scientific station manned by British and Swedish scientists would incorporate whaling research into their scientific programme. They established a prestigious committee to deal with the Swedish side of the undertaking, chaired by Louis Palander, the naval officer who had captained the SS Vega on the first successful traverse of the Northeast Passage in 1878–79. A key member of the committee was the industrialist Axel Lagrelius, who promised to provide half of the Swedish share of the annual costs of the station. Informal talks with government officials indicated that the state would help, if matching contributions were forthcoming from the British. The costs were estimated at £3,000 per year – £1500 to be provided from Sweden, £1,500 from Britain. (Note: For an approximation of equivalent 2019 values, £3,000 equates to about £300,000.)

On the British side, although Harmer and Keltie were enthusiastic, the Colonial Office was cool. They had appointed Major Gerald Barrett-Hamilton to conduct a one-man investigation into whaling, and until his report was available, the Colonial Office was unwilling to take further steps. An additional difficulty was the British government policy whereby local projects were required to be locally financed; thus, the projected British annual share of £1,500 would fall on the FID, a sum beyond the means of their small budget. No such problems were encountered on the Swedish side, where the government readily included its share of the costs in the 1914 national budget. Whereas the Swedish government had been influenced by the prestige of such as Palander, and his appeal to "bringing new honour to old Sweden", in British government circles there was a general weariness with Antarctic expeditions, and no authoritative voice equivalent to Palander's to press the case.

In an effort to break the impasse, Nordenskjöld travelled to Britain early in 1914. There, he worked with Harmer to reduce the size of any government contribution, and was able to secure a grant from the NHM of £500 for each of the five projected years of the scientific station. The Royal Society provided a one-off sum of £500. Nordenskjöld hoped that the RGS would match the NHM amount, but in spite of Keltie's advocacy its council would only offer £200 for the first year, and £100 a year thereafter. Meanwhile, Barrett-Hamilton had sent a preliminary report, but died shortly thereafter, leaving his investigation incomplete. While remaining sceptical of the utility of the Swedish plan, the FID then offered a token sum of £100 per year to the venture.

Thus, in the spring of 1914, a substantial financial shortfall still existed on the British side. Notwithstanding this, Nordensjöld and Palander made a confident statement of the proposed expedition's aims and objectives, published in the RGS journal in May 1914. Beyond the scientific studies, including the biology of whales, they declared that the expedition would seek to resolve the outstanding question, which Wilhelm Filchner's recently returned German expedition had failed to do, as to whether Antarctica was a single integrated entity, or was divided between separate landmasses on the east and west. On the question of financing, they announced optimistically that "the enterprise has met with the heartiest support in England", and glossed over the shortfall, stating that "to judge from news lately received from the committee, England's [financial] share in the undertaking gives promise of equalling Sweden's". A projected start date was given as August 1915.

== War, delays, abandonment ==
The outbreak of the First World War in August 1914 frustrated all these plans. Harmer informed Nordenskjöld that the expedition would have to be postponed; Nordenskjöld hoped a 1915 start was still possible, if the funding shortfall could be overcome. However, Keltie told him that the RGS was suspending its funding, and that making further plans was now pointless.

Nordenskjöld would not give up hope, and thought that, if the world situation improved, a 1916 start might be achieved. A notice in the American Wanamaker Diary for 1916 announced the postponement of the departure date until 1916, adding: "It is hoped that a further postponement will not be necessary". But in October 1917, the NHM withdrew its funding, effectively ending all hope for the expedition. In Sweden, the funding remained in place, and after the war's end in 1918, tentative approaches were made to Britain to see if the idea could be revived. Harmer declared that there was no longer any British interest. In 1919 the Swedish committee dissolved itself, and the funds were distributed to other projects.

== Aftermath ==
During the 1930s, and again in the 1940s, Andersson raised the possibility of reviving the defunct Anglo-Swedish plans. His suggestion was taken up by the geographer and geologist Hans Ahlmann; there followed proposals for a multi-national scientific expedition involving Norway, Sweden, Britain and perhaps other countries. These discussions led eventually to the Norwegian–British–Swedish Antarctic Expedition (NBSX) of 1949–52. This was carried out by a mixed team of Norwegian, British and Swedish scientists, from a base in Queen Maud Land rather than Graham Land, and its researches were confined to glaciology, meteorology and geology.

By this time, Nordenskjöld was long since dead. After the First World War he continued his academic career at the University of Gothenburg. He never revisted the Antarctic, although he led expeditions to Peru and southern Chile in 1920–21. He died on 2 June 1928, following a street accident near his home in Gothenburg. In 1919 Andersson returned to China, which he had first visited in 1914. He remained there for many years, devoting himself to archaeological exploration, and discovered the initial evidence that later proved the existence of Peking Man. Andersson died in 1960.

Keltie retired from the RGS secretaryship in 1915. He was knighted in 1918, and died in 1927. Harmer became director of the Natural History Museum in 1919, serving until his retirement in 1927. He was appointed KBE in 1920, and received many other honours before his death in 1950.

The failed Anglo-Swedish Antarctic Expedition was Palander's final involvement in public affairs. He died in 1920.

== Notes and references ==
=== Sources ===
Books, journals, conferences

- Burnett, D. Graham (2012). The Sounding of the Whale: Science and Cetaceans in the Twentieth Century. Chicago: University of Chicago Press. ISBN 978-0-226-08130-4. "Anglo-Swedish Antarctic."
- Cardone, Ignacio Javier (2019). A continent for peace and science: Antarctic science and international politics from the Sixth International Geographical Congress to the Antarctic Treaty (1895–1959) (PhD). University of Sao Paulo and King's College, London.
- Elzinga, Aant (December 2016). Otto Nordenskjöld and the Swedish Antarctic Expedition 1901-1903 in scientific context. Fifth annual Roald Amundsen Memorial Lectures. University of Gothenburg.
- Francioni, Francesco; Scovazzi, Tullio, eds. (1996). International Law for Antarctica. London, The Hague and Boston MA: Kluwer Law International. ISBN 9-0411-0364-3.
- Headland, R.K. (1989). Chronological List of Antarctic Expeditions and Related Historical Events. Cambridge: Cambridge University Press. ISBN 978-1-446-42346-2.
- Huntford, Roland (1985). Shackleton. London: Hodder & Stoughton. ISBN 0-340-25007-0.
- Kish, George (1979). "Discovery of the Northeast Passage: the Voyage of the Vega, 1878–79" (PDF). GeoJournal. 3 (4): 387–394. doi:10.1007/BF00221241. hdl:2027.42/42790. JSTOR 41142873. S2CID 153514785.
- Lewander, Lisbeth (2–3 June 2005). The Norwegian-British-Swedish Expedition (NBSX) to Antarctica 1949–52 – science and security. 1st SCAR Workshop on the History of Antarctic Research. Bavarian Academy of Sciences and Humanities. pp. 123–141.
- Palander, Louis; Nordenskjöld, Otto (May 1914). "The Plan for a New Anglo-Swedish Antarctic Expedition". The Geographical Journal. 43 (5). The Royal Geographical Society: 554–558. doi:10.2307/1778303. JSTOR 1778303.
- Roberts, Peder (June 2010). A Frozen Field of Dreams, Science, Strategy, and the Antarctic in Norway, Sweden, and the British Empire, 1912-1952 (PhD). Stanford University.
- Roberts, Peder (2011). "Science, Commerce, and the State". The European Antarctic. Palgrave Studies in Cultural and Intellectual History. New York: Palgrave Macmillan. pp. 11–29. doi:10.1057/9780230337909_2. ISBN 978-1-349-29705-4.
- The Wanamaker Diary. New York: John Wanamaker. 1916. ISBN 9781434470973. OCLC 34848710.

Web sources

- "Adolf Erik, Baron Nordenskiöld Swedish explorer". Encyclopædia Britannica online.
- Baigent, Elizabeth (2004). "Keltie, Sir John Scott". Oxford Dictionary of National Biography (online ed.). Oxford University Press. doi:10.1093/ref:odnb/34269. (Subscription or UK public library membership required.)
- "Five Ways to Compute the Relative Value of a UK Pound Amount, 1270 to Present". MeasuringWorth.
- "Harmer, Sir Sidney Frederic". Oxford Dictionary of National Biography (online ed.). Oxford University Press. 2009. doi:10.1093/ref:odnb/37512. (Subscription or UK public library membership required.)
- "History of the Territory". British Antarctic Territory.
- "Johan Gunnar Andersson". Encyclopædia Britannica.
- "Norwegian–British–Swedish Antarctic Expedition, 1949–52". Scott Polar Research Institute, University of Cambridge.
- Odelberg, Wilhelm. "A A Louis Palander af Vega". Riksarkivet (National archives). (in Swedish)
- "Otto Nordenskjöld (1869–1928)". South-pole.com.
- "Otto Nordenskjöld (1869-1928)". University of Gothenburg Library.
- "Otto Nordenskjöld, Swedish explorer". Encyclopædia Britannica online.
- "Scientific Expedition Reports: University of Otago Special Collections" (PDF). University of Otago. p. 30.
