= Axel Ludvig Broström =

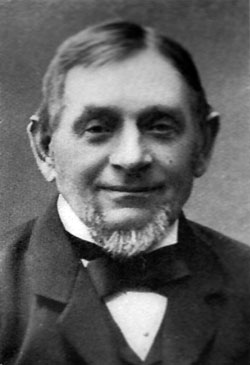
Axel Broström (c. 1900)

Axel Ludvig Broström (May 21, 1838 in Kristinehamn – September 21, 1905) was a prosperous Swedish shipping owner.

During his youth, Axel joined a shipping company. Later he became an owner and captain in the inland (lake) shipping business. In 1865, Axel used a loan to purchase a wooden trading ketch, Mathilda. This would lead to the founding of the Swedish shipping company Broström Lines.

His son, Dan Broström, was the Swedish naval minister from 1914 to 1917. His grandson, Tor Erland Broström, was board chairman of Swedish American Line.
