= Dan Broström =

Swedish politician

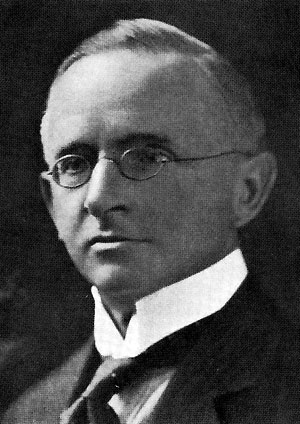
- Born: 1 February 1870; Kristinehamns församling
- Died: 24 July 1925 (aged 55); Trönninge parish
- Resting place: Östra kyrkogården
- Occupation: Politician, ship-owner
- Spouse(s): Anna Ida Broström
- Children: Dan-Axel Broström
- Parent(s): Axel Ludvig Broström
- Position held: member of the Second Chamber (1906–1911)

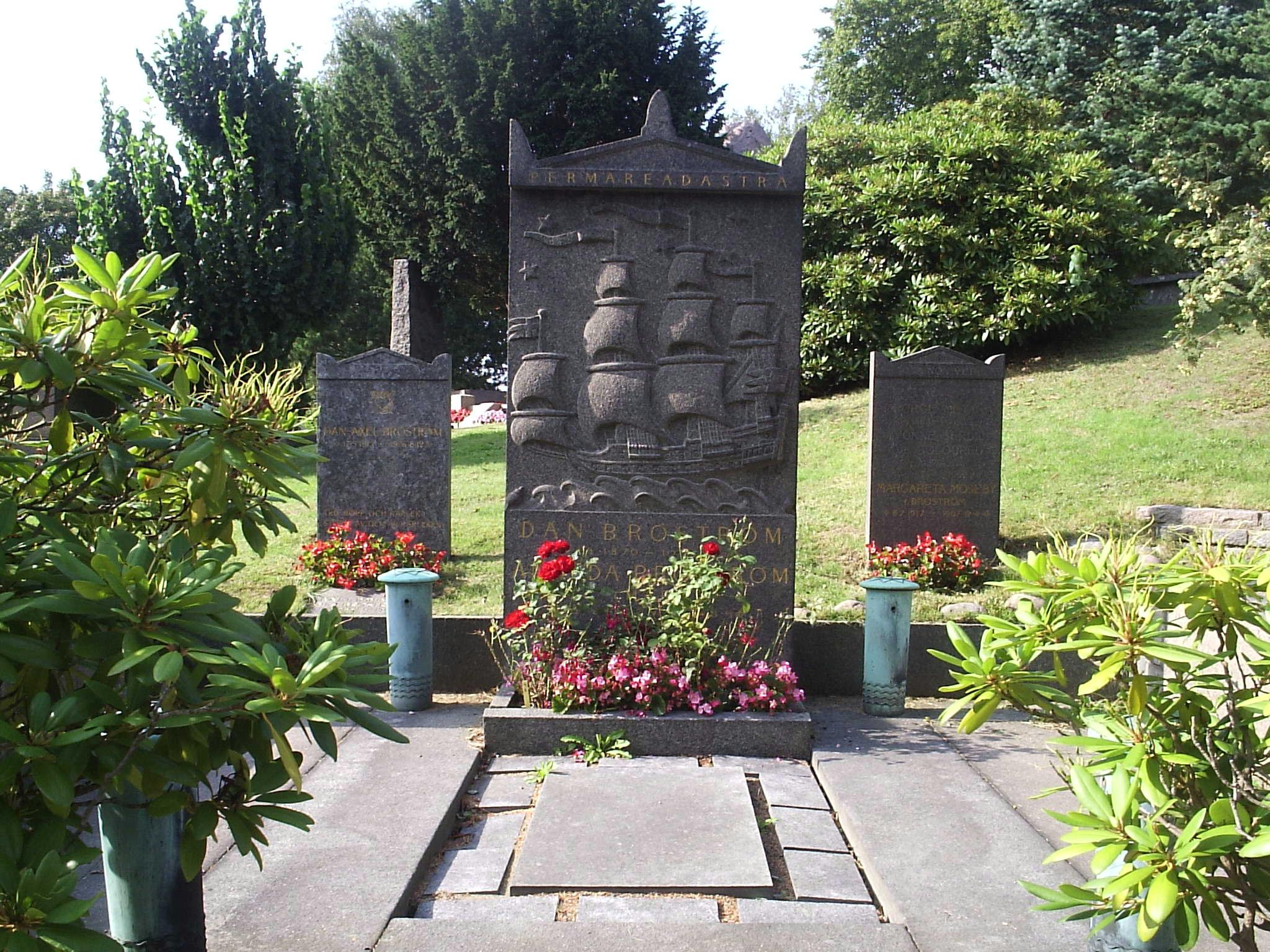
Dan Broström's grave in Gothenburg. The tombstone is decorated with a sailing ship.

Daniel Broström (1870 in Kristinehamn – 24 July 1925) was the Swedish Minister for Naval Affairs from 1914 to 1917. He was the son of Axel Broström. He was married to Anna Ida Broström, and had a son, Dan-Axel Broström. Broström died in a car accident near Trönninge, south of Halmstad, on 24 July 1925.
