= Premiärlöjtnant =

Premiärlöjtnant was a military rank between captain and second lieutenant in the Swedish Navy from 1824 to 1866. In the 1820s, premiärlöjtnant was equivalent to the rank of captain in the Swedish Army, but this changed in 1841 when a new rank, captain lieutenant, was introduced. This later rank was then equated with that of captain, while premiärlöjtnant received the rank of lieutenant. The title was retained until 1866 when the navy was restructured, and the rank of premiärlöjtnant became that of a lieutenant.
