= Louis Palander =

Swedish admiral

His Excellency Admiral The Well Born Herr Louis Palander
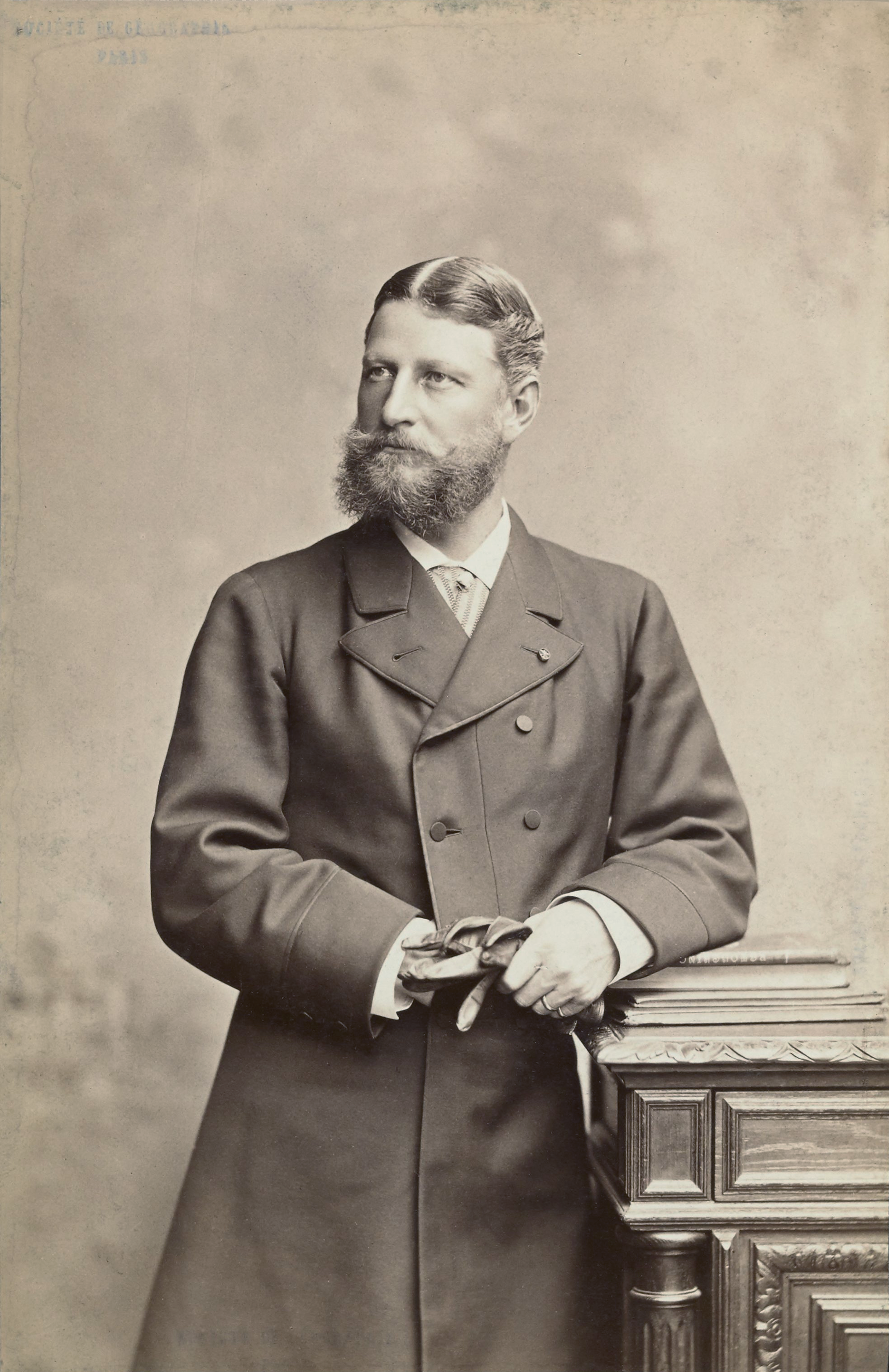
- Born: Adolf Arnold Louis Palander; 2 October 1842; Karlskrona, Sweden
- Died: 7 August 1920 (aged 77); Djursholm, Sweden
- Spouse: Anna Katarina Grischotti
- Military career
- Allegiance: Sweden
- Branch: Swedish Navy
- Service years: 1864-1910
- Rank: Admiral
- Awards: Founder's Medal (1880); Vega Medal (1882)
- Other work: Arctic explorer Minister for Naval Affairs (1901–05)

Adolf Arnold Louis Palander af Vega (2 October 1842 – 7 August 1920) was a Swedish naval officer, mostly remembered as the captain on Adolf Erik Nordenskiöld's Vega expedition, the first successful attempt to navigate the Northeast Passage.

== Early navy career ==
Louis Palander was born in Karlskrona, Sweden. His father Axel Fredrik Palander was a rear admiral in the Swedish Navy, and the director of the Royal Navy shipyard in Karlskrona. His mother was Emelie Jacquette Constance du Rées. Louis Palander became a naval cadet at the early age of 14. In 1864 he graduated from the Royal Swedish Naval Academy at Karlberg Palace as a second lieutenant and participated in expeditions to the Mediterranean, Sierra Leone and Liberia on the corvette Gefle, as well as in a trip to the United States. After several other appointments at sea, Louis Palander participated in Nordenskiöld's expedition to Spitsbergen in 1868, on board the steamer Sofia. The ship's captain was baron Fredrik von Otter. He married Anna Katarina Grischotti the same year.

Thereafter, Palander served on the ship Vanadis on an expedition to the Mediterranean in 1869–1870. He was subsequently promoted to lieutenant and was the ship's captain on the postal steamer Polhem, first during the winter of 1870–1871 between Gotland and main land Sweden, and then during 1871–1872 to secure the postal route across the Øresund in severe winter conditions. He was also the ship's captain on the steamer Polhem during Nordenskiöld's winter expedition to the Spitsbergen islands in 1872–1873, where he significantly contributed to the scientific work. From the base camp at Mosselbay, Palander and nine other men accompanied Nordenskiöld on the unsuccessful attempt to reach the North Pole in May–June 1873. Upon return to Sweden, Palander's request for an honourable discharge from the navy was granted, and he took employment first as a captain on cargo ships en route to England, and later as a captain for a steamer line based in Gothenburg.

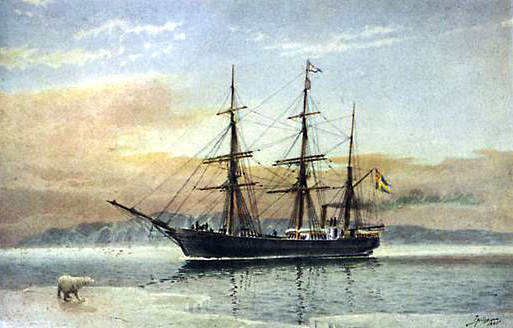
Swedish steamship SS Vega

== Vega Expedition ==
In 1877 Palander returned to the Royal Navy and offered to become the captain on the expedition to navigate the Northeast Passage. For this purpose, Palander secured the whaling ship Vega, and selected the crew and officers. The ship sailed from Karlshamn on 22 June 1878, and arrived in Tromsø, (Norway) on 17 July where Nordenskiöld boarded the ship. The expedition, which was carried out during 1878–1879, was ultimately successful, and shortly before the end of the voyage, he was promoted to the full rank of captain.

Upon return to Sweden, he was made a noble by King Oscar II under the surname Palander af Vega, and the Swedish Parliament awarded him an annual pension of 4,000 Swedish crowns. Palander was an accomplished amateur photographer and brought home 76 photographic plates depicting the journey and people encountered during the trip.

== Later navy and political career ==
During 1881–1883, Palander served as an aide-de-camp to the director of the Royal Navy shipyard in Karlskrona, as well as to the Department of Sea Warfare during 1886–1889. In 1889 he was promoted to commander and in 1893 he was appointed as chief of the supply service (intendenturavdelningen) for the Royal Swedish Naval Materiel Administration. In 1896 he was promoted to rear admiral and first aide-de-camp to the king, and subsequently in 1897 appointed as the director of the Royal Navy shipyard in Karlskrona. In 1899 he was made the Chief of the Royal Swedish Naval Materiel Administration and in 1900 promoted to full rank of rear admiral. In 1901 he became a cabinet minister responsible for the Ministry for Naval Affairs. In 1903 he was promoted to vice admiral.

On 2 August 1905 he resigned his post as cabinet minister together with the rest of the government (as a consequence of the political crisis arising from the dissolution of the union between Norway and Sweden) and resumed his post in the Swedish Royal Navy.

== Honours ==
- (Sweden) Dowager Queen Josefina's Commemorative Medal (1873)
- (Sweden) Knight of the Order of Vasa (1874)
- (Sweden) Knight First Class of the Order of the Polar Star (1880)
- (Russian Empire) Order of Saint Anna, Second Class (1880)
- (Kingdom of Italy) Commander of the Order of the Crown of Italy (1880)
- (Kingdom of Portugal) Knight of the Military Order of Saint James of the Sword (1880)
- (Grand Duchy of Baden) Knight of the Order of the Zähringer Lion (1881)
- (Kingdom of Prussia) Order of the Red Eagle (1888)
- (United Kingdom) Royal Geographical Society Founder's Medal, 1880
- (Sweden) Vega Medal, 1882
- (Russian Empire) Order of Saint Anna, First Class (1890)
- (Sweden) King Oscar II's Jubilee Commemorative Medal (1897)
- (France) Grand Officer of the Legion of Honour (1906)
- (Sweden) King Oscar II and Queen Sofia's Golden Wedding Commemorative Medal (1907)
- (United Kingdom) Honorary Knight Grand Cross of the Royal Victorian Order (GCVO), 1908

== Other sources ==
- Svenskt Biografiskt Handlexikon (SBH), 2nd edition, Albert Bonniers Förlag, Stockholm, 1906.

Political offices
| Preceded by Gerhard Dyrssen | Minister for Naval Affairs; 1901–1905 | Succeeded by Arvid Lindman |

[Category:Knights of the Order of the Polar Star]]
