= Sekundlöjtnant =

Sekundlöjtnant was, according to the regulation of 1824, a subaltern rank in the Swedish Navy with two salary classes, the higher one carrying the rank of löjtnant (sub-lieutenant) and the lower one carrying the rank of underlöjtnant. In 1841, the older class was given the name premiärlöjtnant, while the younger class retained its title until 1866, when the navy was divided. The names of the mentioned ranks were then changed to löjtnant and underlöjtnant, with corresponding ranks as in the Swedish Army.
