= Ministry for Naval Affairs (Sweden) =

Government ministry, 1840–1920

- Sjöförsvarsdepartementet

Ministry of defence overview
- Formed: 16 May 1840
- Dissolved: 30 June 1920
- Superseding Ministry of defence: Ministry of Defence
- Headquarters: Stockholm, Sweden
- Minister responsible: Minister for Naval Affairs
- Parent agency: Royal Chancery

Ministry for Naval Affairs (Swedish: Sjöförsvarsdepartementet), established in 1840, was at the time one of the eight ministries, in which the Swedish government administration was divided into. The Ministry for Naval Affairs was established in connection with the ministry reform in 1840. Land defence and naval defence affairs, which had previously been dealt with in the War Office (Krigsexpeditionen), was now divided into two different ministries. The two ministries was in 1920 merge into the newly established Ministry of Defence.

== History ==
According to the Royal Charter of 31 March 1900, this ministry should prepare and present the following matters: naval defense organizing and maintenance, for naval defense related personnel and equipment; the disposition of the funds allocated to the naval defense, as well as educational institutions, church and medical affairs, as well as pension and charitable institutions for the fleet staff; boatswain allotment and rotation; care for residences, buildings and facilities for the naval defense needs; the Nautical Chart Department and Nautical Meteorological Agency (Nautisk-meteorologiska byrån); tonnage measurement; the Maritime Pilot and Lighthouse Institution (Lots- och fyrinrättningen) with lifesaving institutions at Swedish coasts; educational and training establishments for the shipping industry.

The matters were presented before the King in Council by the head of the ministry, who officially held the title "Minister and Head of the Royal Ministry for Naval Affairs" but was colloquially called Minister for Naval Affairs. He was also the rapporteur before the king in command cases regarding the fleet. For preparing these matters, the head of the ministry had a department of the Royal Chancery (Kunglig Majestäts kansli), which in 1916 consisted of 1 permanent undersecretary, two administrative officers (one of whom for a special fee was handling some tasks, which in other government departments was handled by the bureau chief), 1 extra rapporteurs, one registrar and an unspecified number of extra workers (assistants).

To the Ministry for Naval Affairs belongs the Military Office (Kommandoexpedition) of the Ministry for Naval Affairs, the Royal Swedish Naval Materiel Administration, the Fleet Staff, navy personnel, naval stations and for employees subordinate to the Ministry for Naval Affairs, education, health care, pension and other institutions; the Coastal Artillery; the Royal Swedish Society of Naval Sciences; the Nautical Chart Department, Nautical Meteorological Agency; the Maritime Pilot Board (Lotsstyrelsen), the Maritime Pilot Administration (Lotsverket); the navigation schools; foundations intended for staff subordinate to the Ministry for Naval Affairs. Before the 1840 ministry reform, the matters, which now belonged to the minister and the head of Ministry for Naval Affairs, were dealt by the State Secretary of the War Office and the adjutant general of the fleets.

== Location ==
Ministry for Naval Affairs' office and the Military Office was located during the years 1840–1850 at Stenbockska palatset at Birger Jarls torg 4. In 1850 the ministry moved to Birger Jarls torg 11, where it remained until 1909. The ministry then moved to Arvfurstens palats, where its offices were located until the ministry was merged into the Ministry of Defence in 1920.

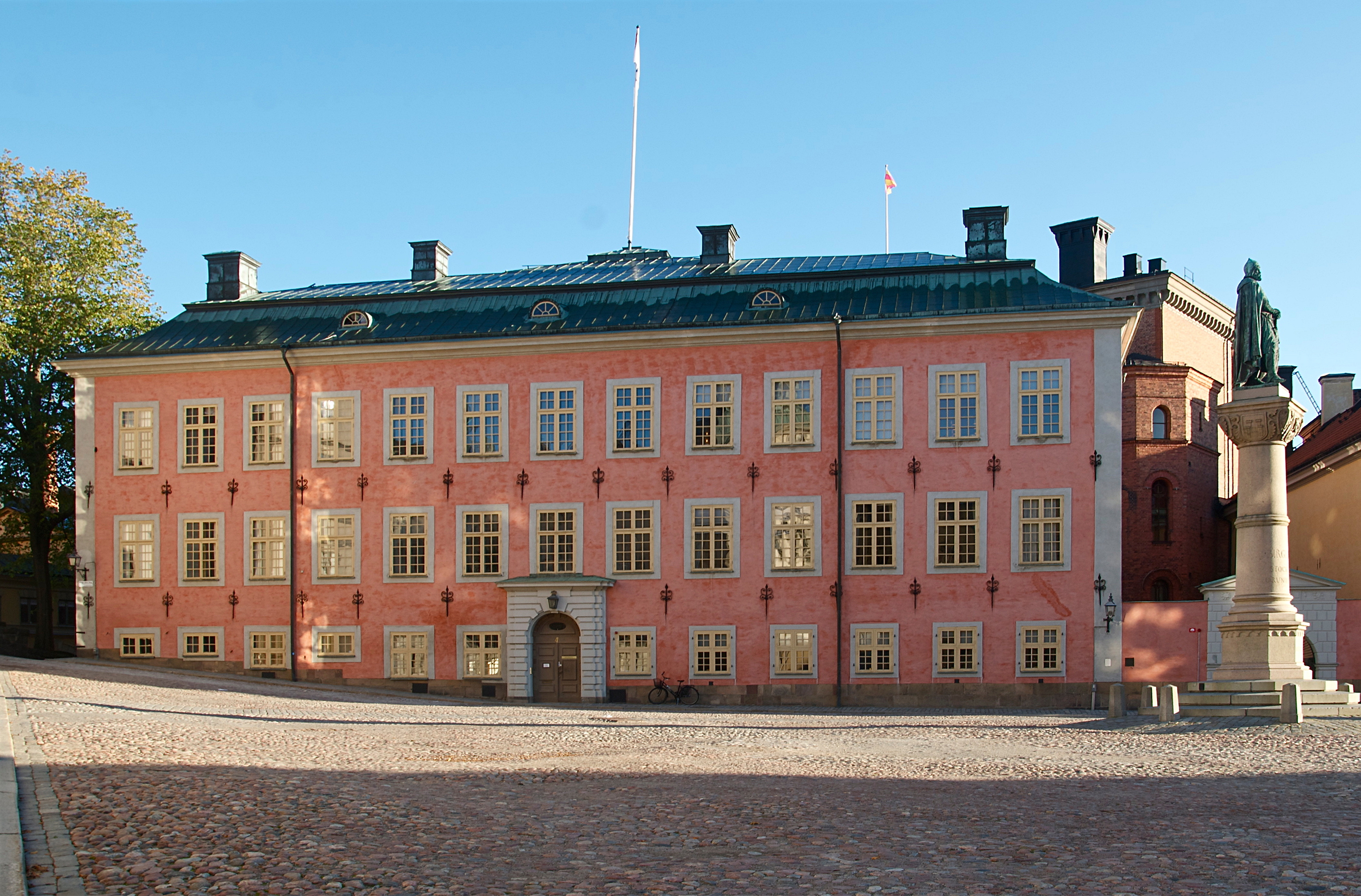
Stenbockska palatset at Birger Jarls torg 4, the first location of the ministry from 1840 until 1850.

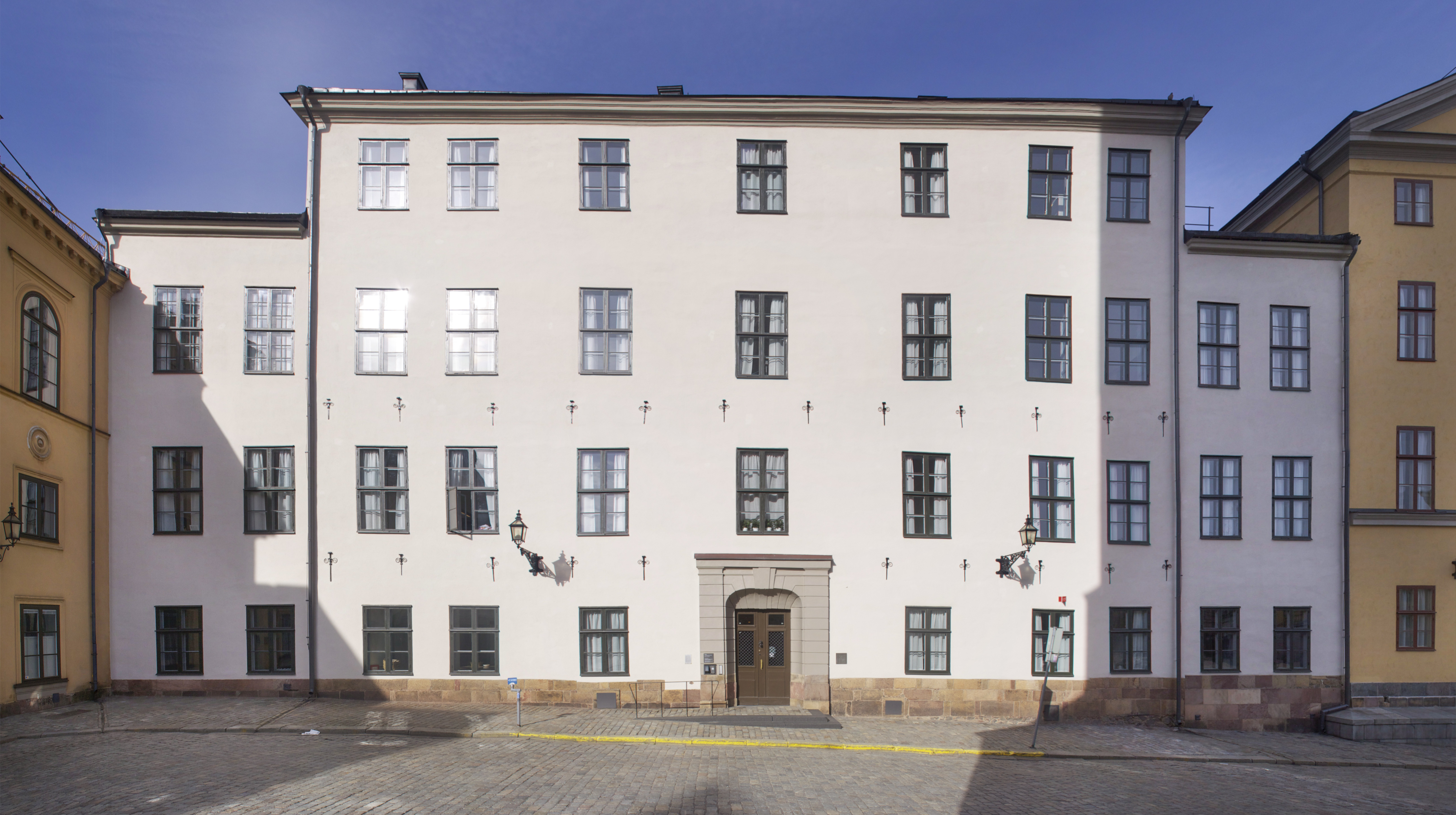
Sparreska palatset at Birger Jarls torg 11, the second location of the ministry from 1850 until 1909.

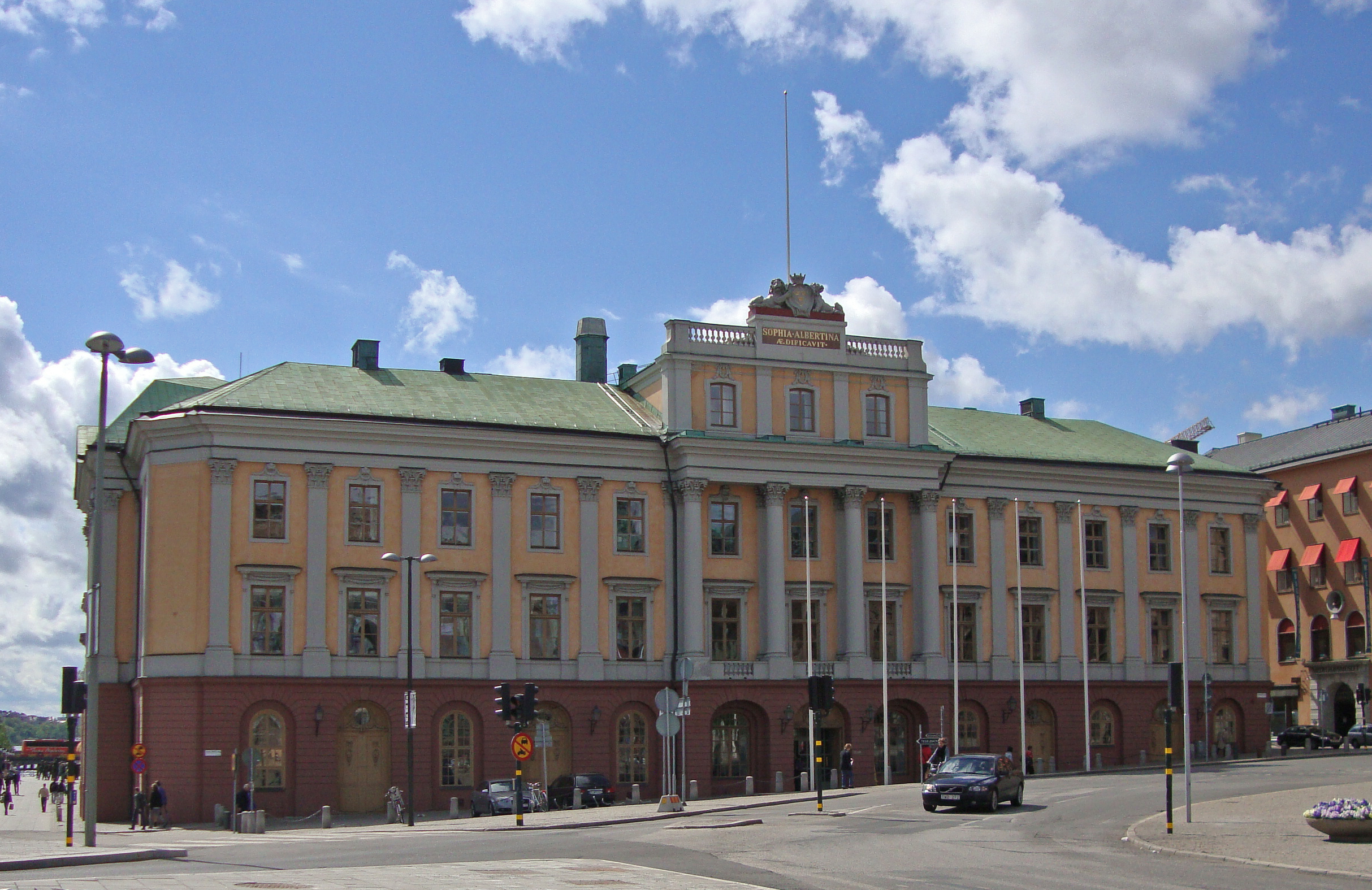
Arvfurstens palats at Gustav Adolfs torg 1, the third location of the ministry from 1909 until 1920.

== Ministers ==
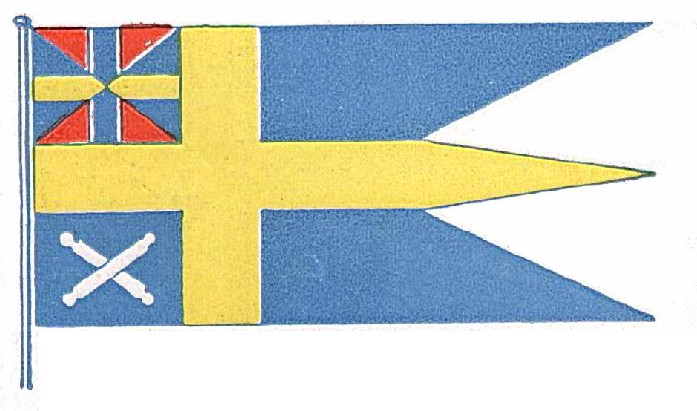
Pennant of the head of the Ministry for Naval Affairs.

Chiefs:

- 1840–1844: Johan Lagerbjelke
- 1844–1848: Carl August Gyllengranat
- 1848–1849: Johan Fredrik Ehrenstam
- 1848–1849: Karl Ludvig von Hohenhausen (acting (Note: Major General Karl Ludvig von Hohenhausen was acting from 27 August 1848 to 21 April 1849.))
- 1849–1852: Baltzar von Platen
- 1852–1857: Carl Ulner
- 1857–1862: Carl Magnus Ehnemark
- 1862–1868: Baltzar von Platen
- 1868–1870: Magnus Thulstrup
- 1870–1874: Abraham Leijonhufvud
- 1874–1880: Fredrik von Otter
- 1880–1892: Carl-Gustaf von Otter
- 1892–1898: Jarl Christersson
- 1898–1901: Gerhard Dyrssen
- 1901–1905: Louis Palander
- 1905–1905: Arvid Lindman
- 1905–1906: Ludvig Sidner
- 1906–1907: Wilhelm Dyrssen
- 1907–1910: Carl-August Ehrensvärd
- 1910–1911: Henning von Krusenstierna
- 1911–1914: Jacob Larsson
- 1914–1917: Dan Broström
- 1917–1917: Hans Ericson
- 1917–1920: Erik Palmstierna
- 1920–1920: Bernhard Eriksson

== Permanent Undersecretaries ==
- 1840–1848: Sven Vilhelm Gynther
- 1848–1855: Curt Fredrik Meinander (acting until 1852)
- 1855–1869: Malcolm von Schantz
- 1869–1870: Fredrik Reinhold Lorichs
- 1870–1882: Carl Nordenfalk
- 1882–1895: Rudolf Emil Eckerström
- 1895–1903: Carl Johan Wall
- 1903–1905: Carl Hederstierna
- 1905–1906: Vacant
- 1906–1908: Henrik Wolff
- 1908–1909: Eugen Björklund
- 1909–1915: Erik Planting-Gyllenbåga
- 1915–1920: Abraham Unger
