= Birger Jarls torg =

Square in Riddarholmen, Stockholm, Sweden

Coordinates: 59.32500°N 18.064152°E

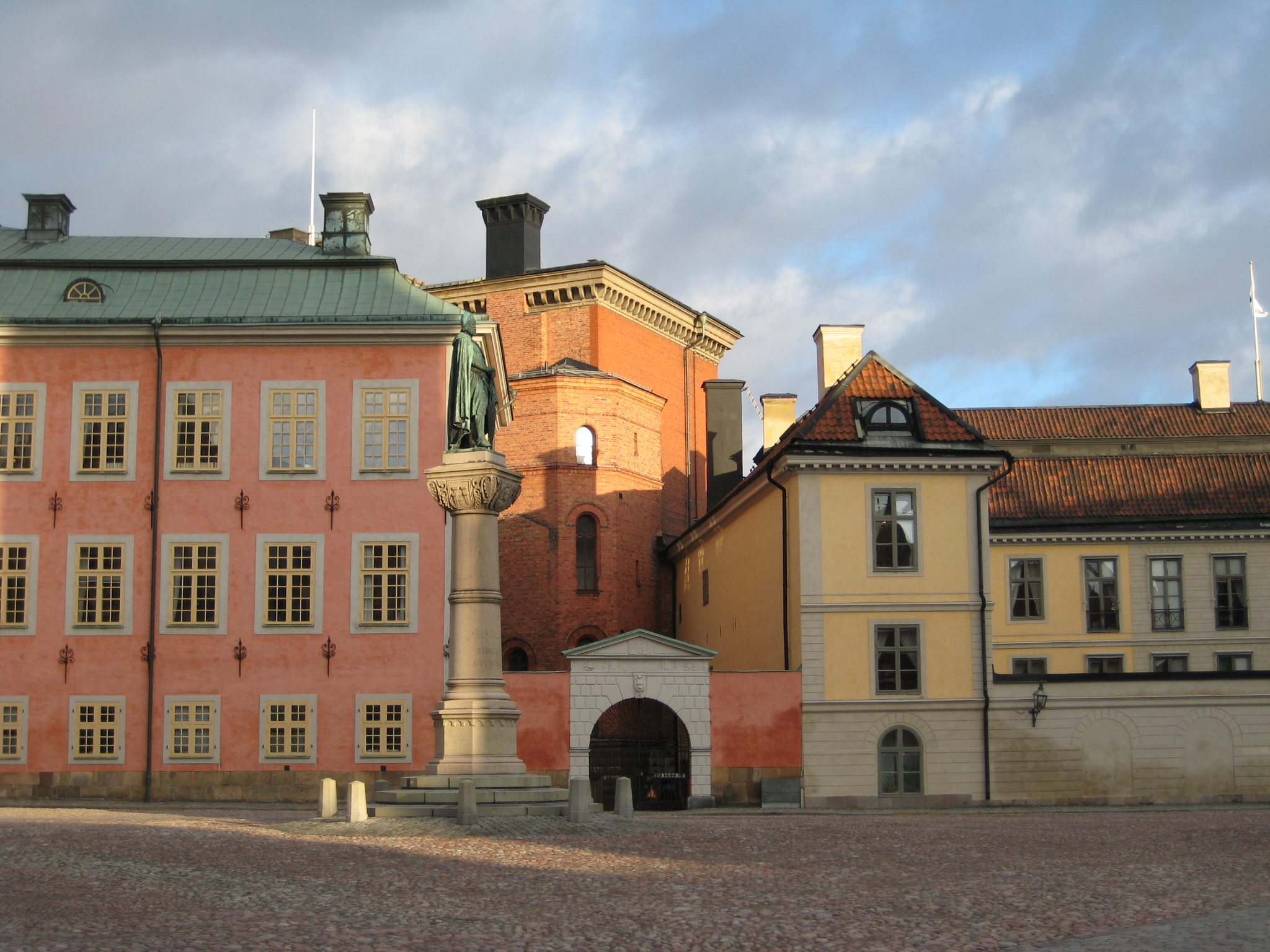
Birger Jarls torg with Birger Jarl's statue

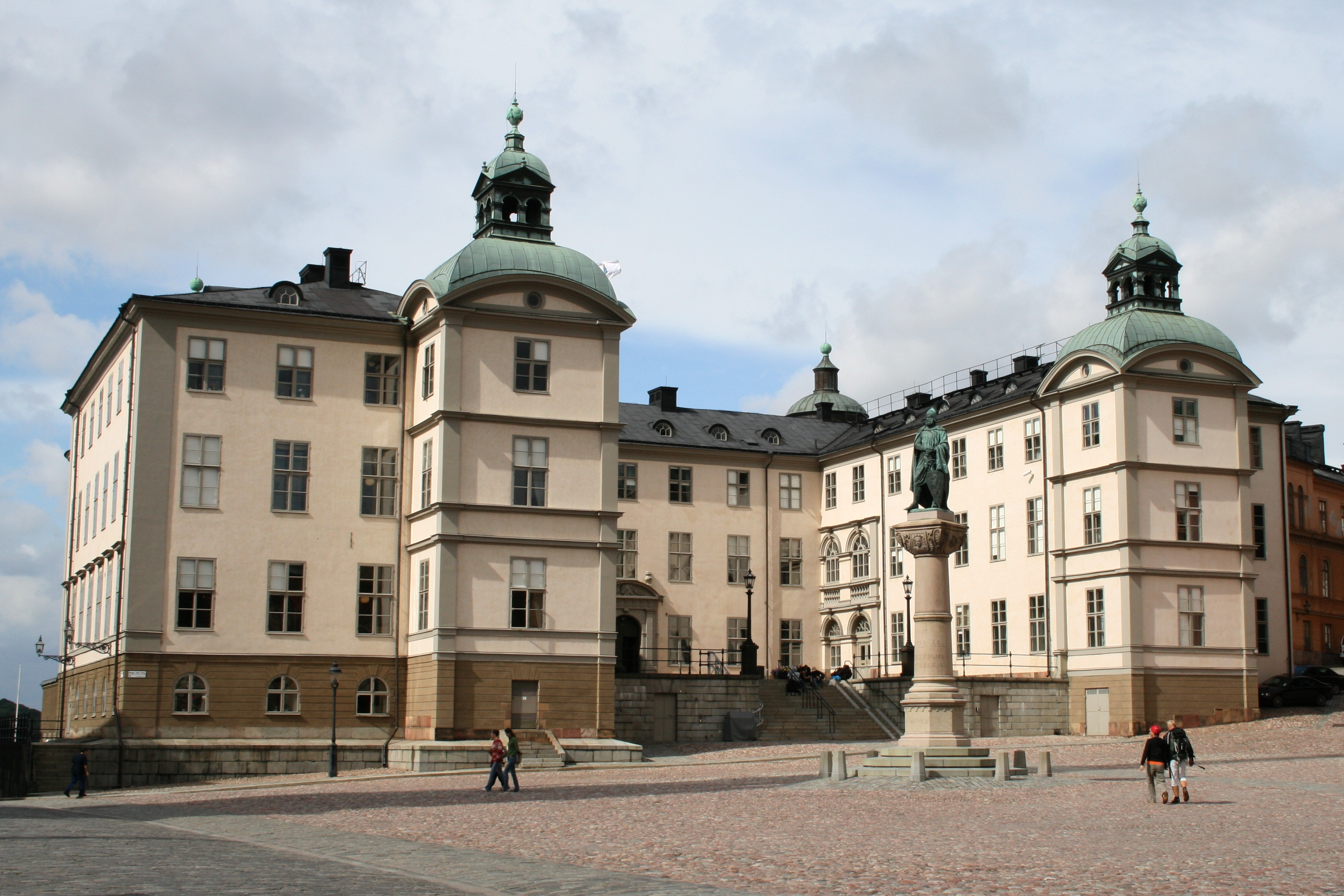
Palace of Wrangel

Birger Jarls torg is a public square on Riddarholmen in Gamla stan, the old town in Stockholm, Sweden.

== History ==
The square used to be called Riddarholmstorget, but was in the mid-19th century renamed Birger Jarls torg after Birger Jarl, traditionally attributed as the founder of Stockholm. A statue of him was erected on the square in 1854. It was designed by Swedish sculptor Bengt Erland Fogelberg (1786–1854).

The square is surrounded by six palaces, today mostly occupied by various governmental authorities. The area is isolated from the rest of the city by the artery traffic route Centralbron. (See Riddarholmen.) Riddarholmen Church is on the southern side of the square.

== See also ==
- List of streets and squares in Gamla stan
