= Uggla =

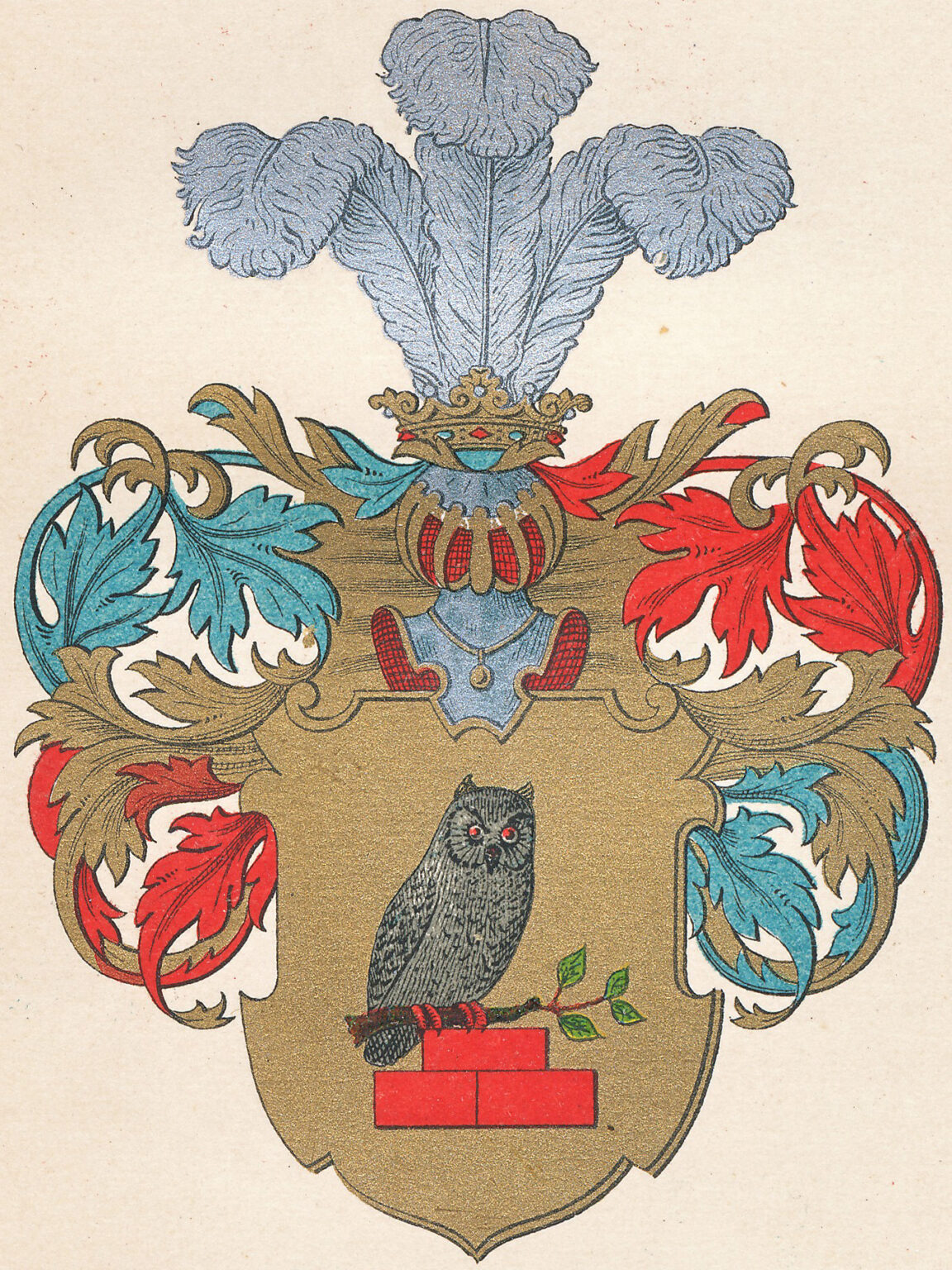
Coat of arms of the Uggla family

The Uggla family ("owl") is a Swedish noble family, probably originating in the province of Västergötland.

== History ==
The oldest known holder of the surname was Claes Hansson, squire of Bosgården, who was recorded in 1515. After his grandson, Claes Arvidsson, the bailiff of Älvsborg, the family split into three main branches: the Finnish branch, the Krokstad branch in Bohuslän, and the Värmland branch. A grandson of Claes Arvidsson was Admiral Claes Uggla (1614–1676), who was made a friherre (Baron) in 1676. He died later that year in a naval battle near the island of Öland.

Uggla is one of Sweden's most widespread noble families. As of 2013 there were 499 people named Uggla living in Sweden. See List of Swedish noble families.

== Notable members ==
- Ane Mærsk Mc-Kinney Uggla (born 1948), Swedish-Danish business executive
- Bertil Uggla (1890–1945), Swedish Olympic medalist, son of Gustaf Uggla
- Bengt Uggla (1894–1937), Swedish modern pentathlete, son of Gustaf Uggla
- Claes Uggla (1614–1676), Swedish admiral
- Dan Uggla (born 1980), American baseball player
- Emilia Uggla (1819–1855), Swedish noble classical concert pianist and concert singer
- Gustaf Uggla (1846–1924), Swedish general
- Hjalmar Uggla (1908–1983), Polish soil scientist
- Lance Uggla (born 1962), British Canadian businessman
- Magnus Uggla (born 1954), Swedish artist and composer
- Maria Aurora Uggla (1747–1826), Swedish lady in waiting
- Riley Uggla (born 1995), daughter of Lance Uggla

== Other ==
- HSwMS Klas Uggla, two ships in the Swedish navy
