= Gustaf Uggla =

Swedish Army officer

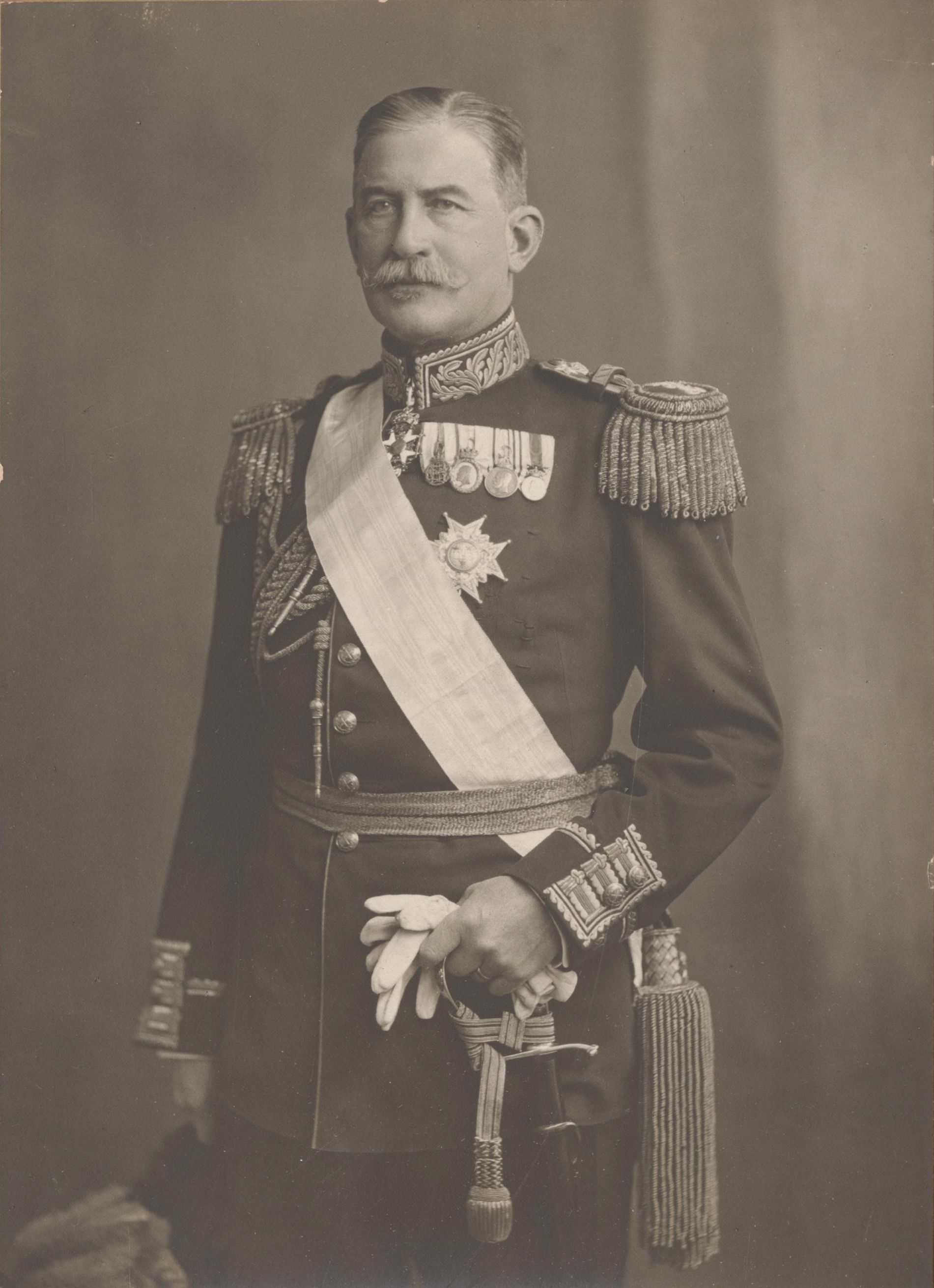
- Born: Gustaf Fredrik Oskar Uggla; 22 January 1846; By, Sweden
- Died: 7 January 1924 (aged 77); Stockholm, Sweden
- Burial place: Solna Cemetery
- Relatives: Bertil Uggla (son); Bengt Uggla (son); Pontus Reuterswärd (son-in-law)
- Military career
- Allegiance: Sweden
- Branch: Swedish Army
- Service years: 1863–1913
- Rank: General
- Commands: Royal Military Academy; Svea Life Guards; 2nd Army Division
- Other work: Chief of His Majesty's Military Staff

General Gustaf Fredrik Oskar Uggla (22 January 1846 – 7 January 1924) was a senior Swedish Army officer. Uggla had a distinguished military career in Sweden during the late 19th and early 20th centuries. Commissioned in 1863, he rose through the ranks, serving in various capacities, including as a teacher at the Royal Military Academy and as a military attaché in Vienna. Uggla's career highlights include commanding the Royal Military Academy and later the 2nd Army Division. He retired as a general in 1913 but continued contributing to military committees.

In addition to his military service, Uggla played a significant role at the Royal Court, serving as ordinance officer to King Oscar II and later becoming First Aide-de-Camp and Chief of His Majesty's Military Staff under King Gustaf V. Uggla's dismissal in 1923 marked the end of his service. Apart from his military and court roles, Uggla engaged in various activities, such as chairing the Central Board of the National Rifle Clubs and serving in the Swedish Red Cross. He was also involved in military writing, contributing to publications on war history and serving as chairman in the Executive Board of the King's Hospital and the life insurance company Balder.

== Early life ==
Uggla was born into the noble Uggla family on 22 January 1846 at Säffle seat farm in By socken, Säffle Municipality, Värmland County, Sweden. He was the son of Major Carl Uggla (1796–1863) and his wife, Lovisa (Louise) Regina, née Örn (1814–1877).

He enrolled as a cadet at the Military Academy Karlberg on 1 June 1859 and graduated on 9 September 1863.

== Career ==
=== Military career ===
Gustaf Uggla was commissioned as a underlöjtnant in the Värmland Regiment on 29 September 1863. From 10 November 1869 to 9 June 1871, he served as an assistant instructor at the Royal Swedish Army Staff College. He was promoted to lieutenant on 10 September 1870 and appointed a General Staff officer on 9 December that year. On 12 May 1871, Uggla became an aide-de-camp to the Duke of Östergötland. On 21 October 1872, he was appointed an aide-de-camp to King Oscar II, with duties involving Crown Prince Gustaf and the princes of the royal family. In 1873, he served as an aide-de-camp to the Saxon-Altenburg envoy at the funeral of Prince August, Duke of Dalarna. On 19 December that year, he was appointed a staff adjutant and lieutenant in the newly created General Staff.

From 1 April 1875 to 1 May 1877, Uggla served as aide-de-camp to the Inspector of Military Schools (Inspektören för militärläroverken). In January 1877, he was an aide-de-camp to Prince Hans of Glücksburg. From 28 April 1877 to 30 March 1883, he taught the art of war at the Royal Military Academy. On 27 September 1878, he was appointed a staff adjutant and first-class captain in the General Staff. On 13 October that year, he became an aide-de-camp to the King. From 15 November 1878 to 3 October 1881, he served as a company commander at the Royal Military Academy.

Uggla was promoted to captain in the Värmland Regiment on 4 April 1879 and took up his regimental duties on 6 August 1880. In September 1881, he represented the regiment at the wedding of the Crown Prince and Crown Princess. On 3 October that year, he was appointed a staff adjutant and captain in the General Staff. From 15 October 1881 to 2 May 1890, he served as chief of staff of the Life Guards Brigade and of the 4th Army Division and Military District.

From 26 February 1883 to 1 April 1885, Uggla served as military attaché in Vienna. In 1884, he attended the Austrian Army's autumn manoeuvres in the Marchfeld. In April 1885, he accompanied the King as an aide-de-camp on visits to Bucharest, Constantinople, Vienna and Berlin. From 1 September 1885 to 31 July 1890, Uggla taught at the Royal Military Staff College. Between 11 November 1885 and 15 January 1887, he served as secretary to the committee responsible for reviewing the drill regulations of the various branches of the armed forces. On 2 February 1886, he was appointed a senior staff adjutant and major in the General Staff. In June 1889, he served as an aide-de-camp to the Adolphe, Grand Duke of Luxembourg.

On 2 May 1890, Uggla was promoted to lieutenant colonel in the army and appointed head of the Royal Military Academy. On 19 August that year, he became a senior staff adjutant and lieutenant colonel in the General Staff. In August 1893, he was assigned to study German infantry drill regulations and was attached to the Guards Fusilier Regiment in Berlin. From September 1893 to April 1895, he served on the committee responsible for drafting and reviewing proposed infantry drill regulations. Uggla was promoted to colonel in the army on 6 April 1894 and appointed an aide-de-camp to the King on 20 April that year. In July 1895, he served as an aide-de-camp to the German Emperor Wilhelm II during his visit to Stockholm. On 7 February 1896, he was appointed a senior staff adjutant and lieutenant colonel in the General Staff, and on 10 September 1897, he was promoted to colonel in the General Staff.

Later in 1897, Uggla served as an aide-de-camp to the Friedrich, Prince of Waldeck and Pyrmont during the latter's visit to Stockholm for the royal jubilee. That year, he also became a member of the committee tasked with preparing proposals to reorganise the Infantry Shooting School. On 22 December 1897, he was appointed a member of the Court-Martial of Appeal, and on 31 December, he became a colonel and commanding officer of the Svea Life Guards. On 14 June 1898, Uggla became a member of the conscription committee. On 4 November that year, he was appointed a deputy member of the board of the Army Pension Fund. From 16 May to 7 July 1899, he served as acting commandant of the Stockholm garrison.

Uggla was promoted to major general in the army on 12 August 1902 and appointed commander of the 2nd Army Division (II. arméfördelningen) on 7 November that year. On 8 July 1908, he was promoted to lieutenant general in the army. On 30 November 1910, he became First Aide-de-Camp to the King and Chief of the His Majesty's Military Staff. He retired from his position as commander of an army division on 30 May 1913 and was appointed a general in the General Staff Reserve in September that year. On 28 December 1923, Uggla was relieved of his duties as First Aide-de-Camp to the King and Chief of the King's Staff, and died 10 days later.

=== Other work ===
Uggla served as secretary, member, and chairman of several military committees and commissions, including the committee for reviewing the drill regulations of the various branches of the armed forces (1885–1887), the Conscription Committee (1898), the Infantry Drill Regulations Committees (1893–1895, 1902–1904, and 1912), and the commission appointed to investigate matters relating to the regimental chaplain system (1907).

A devoted supporter of the voluntary rifle-shooting movement, Uggla was elected chairman of the Central Board of the National Swedish Rifle Clubs (Skytteförbundens överstyrelse) in 1909. In this capacity, he made a particularly significant contribution to the development of field shooting in a direction that benefited Sweden's national defence. He also served for many years on the boards of the Swedish Central Association for Sports Promotion (Centralföreningen för idrottens främjande) and the Swedish Red Cross. From 1898 to 1902, Uggla was a member of the Court-Martial of Appeal. For a brief period during the 1919 regular session of the Riksdag, he represented Värmland County in the First Chamber.

Uggla also pursued a career as a military writer. In addition to annual reports published in the Krigsvetenskapsakademiens Handlingar och Tidskrift and articles in periodicals, he published The War between Germany and France in 1870 and 1871 (1872), co-authored with G. Kleen and A. Malmborg; A Guide to the Study of the Art of War (1878–1880); and a work on the historical development of military organisation and the art of war (1885), which was not commercially published. He also contributed a section to 1818–1918: A Commemorative Volume Marking the Centenary of the Royal Higher Artillery School and the Military Staff College at Marieberg, and the Artillery and Engineering College (1918).

Uggla had been a member of the Royal Swedish Academy of War Sciences since 1886. Uggla also served as chairman in the Executive Board of the Konungens hospital ("King's Hospital") in 1913 and in the life insurance company Balder.

== Personal life ==
Uggla married on 9 January 1875 to Augusta Eleonora von Post (5 April 1851 in Frösåker – 26 January 1921 in Solna), the daughter of Captain Carl Rangel von Post (1811–1876) and Baroness Elisabeth (Betty), née Cronstedt (1813–1875).

He was the father of: Carl Gustafsson (born 1875); Betty Louise (born 1877); Eva Thurinna (1879–1947); Gustaf Gustafsson (1880–1926); Elsa Augusta (born 1882); Signe Elisabet (born 1883); Axel Gustafsson (born and died 1886); Ernst Axel Gustafsson (born 1880), Bertil Gustafsson (1890–1945); Thorsten Gustafsson (1892–1923), and Bengt Gustafsson (1894–1937).

== Death ==
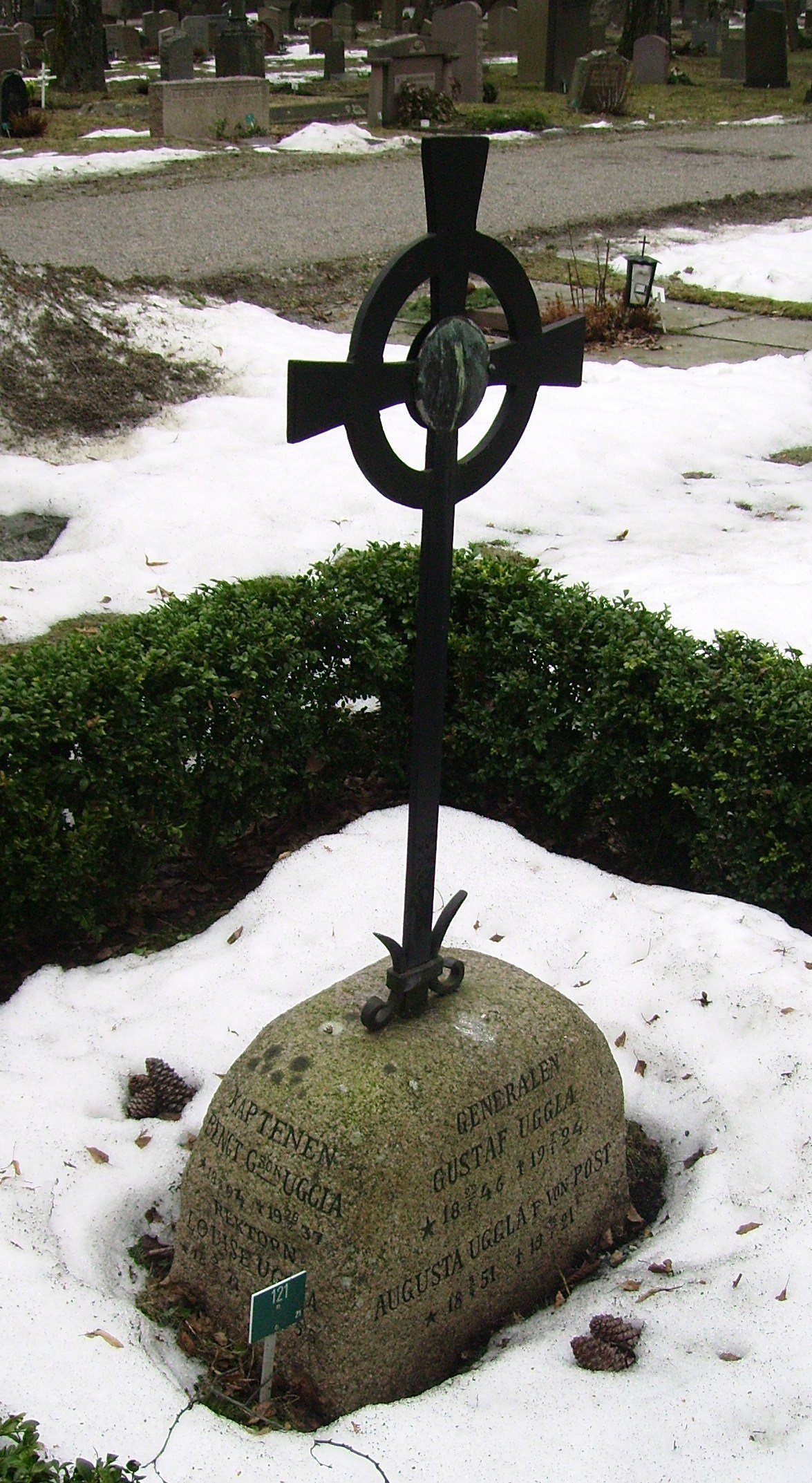
Gustaf Uggla's grave care at Solna Cemetery.

Uggla died on 7 January 1924 in Stockholm. He was interred on 12 January 1924 at Solna Cemetery.

== Dates of rank ==
- 29 September 1863 – Underlöjtnant
- 16 September 1870 – Lieutenant
- 4 April 1879 – Captain
- 2 February 1886 – Major
- 19 August 1890 – Lieutenant colonel
- 6 April 1894 – Colonel
- 12 August 1902 – Major general
- 8 July 1908 – Lieutenant general
- September 1913 – General

== Awards and decorations ==
=== Swedish ===
- (Sweden) Knight and Commander of the Orders of His Majesty the King (Order of the Seraphim) (30 September 1914)
- (Sweden) Commander Grand Cross of the Order of the Sword (6 June 1909)
- (Sweden) Commander 1st Class of the Order of the Sword (30 November 1901)
- (Sweden) Commander of the Order of the Sword (18 September 1897)
- (Sweden) Knight of the Order of the Sword (30 November 1883)
- (Sweden) King Oscar II's Jubilee Commemorative Medal (18 September 1897)
- (Sweden) King Oscar II and Queen Sofia's Golden Wedding Medal (1907)
- (Sweden) King Gustaf V's Olympic Commemorative Medal (1912)
- (Sweden) Shooting Association's Medal of Merit (Skytteförbundets förtjänstmedalj, SkytteGM) (1916)
- (Sweden) Gold medal for sports (Guldmedalj för idrott, IdrGM) (1919)

=== Foreign ===
- (Grand Duchy of Baden) Knight 1st Class of the Order of the Zähringer Lion (20 September 1881)
- (Grand Duchy of Baden) Commander of the Order of the Zähringer Lion (June 1889)
- (Grand Duchy of Baden) Commander 2nd Class of the Order of the Zähringer Lion (at the latest in 1905)
- (Grand Duchy of Baden) Grand Cross of the Order of the Zähringer Lion (1911)
- (Denmark) Knight of the Order of the Dannebrog (2 February 1877)
- (Denmark) Grand Cross of the Order of the Dannebrog (1 June 1913)
- Grand Cross of the Order of the White Rose of Finland (1919)
- (Italy) Knight Grand Cross of the Order of Saints Maurice and Lazarus (1911)
- (Norway) Knight of the Order of St. Olav (1 December 1886)
- (Norway) Commander 1st Class of the Order of St. Olav (23 October 1903)
- (Norway) Grand Cross of the Order of St. Olav (29 November 1917)
- (Kingdom of Prussia) Knight 3rd Class of the Order of the Red Eagle (April 1885)
- (Kingdom of Prussia) Knight 2nd Class of the Order of the Red Eagle (July 1895)
- (Kingdom of Prussia) Knight 1st Class of the Order of the Red Eagle (1908)
- (Kingdom of Prussia) Grand Cross of the Order of the Red Eagle (August 1911)
- (Russian Empire) Knight 1st Class of the Order of Saint Anna (May 1908)
- (Belgium) Commander of the Order of Leopold (19 February 1900)
- (Luxembourg) Commander 2nd Class of the Order of Adolphe of Nassau (July 1889)
- (Portugal) Commander of the Order of Christ (1901)
- (Romania) Commander of the Order of the Crown (April 1885)
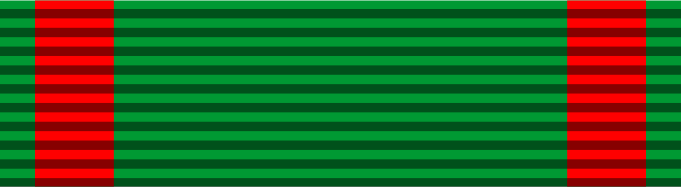
- (Ottoman Empire) 3rd Class of the Order of Osmanieh (April 1885)
- (Saxe-Coburg and Gotha) Knight 1st Class of the Saxe-Ernestine House Order (12 April 1873)
- (Germany) Knight 2nd Class of the Order of Military Merit of Waldeck-Pyrmont (18 September 1897)
- (Austria-Hungary) Knight 3rd Class of the Order of the Iron Crown (1 April 1885)

== Honours ==
- Member of the Royal Swedish Academy of War Sciences (26 October 1886)

== Bibliography ==
- Kleen, Johan Gustaf af; Malmborg, Emil Adolf; Uggla, Gustaf (1872). Kriget mellan Tyskland och Frankrike 1870 och 1871: föredrag hållna i militärsällskapet i Stockholm vintern 1872 (in Swedish). Stockholm. SELIBR 2744227.
- Uggla, Gustaf (1878–1880). Handledning vid studiet af krigskonsten, efter fordringarna för officersexamen (in Swedish). Stockholm. SELIBR 3144334.
- Uggla, Gustaf (1895). Tal af öfverste Gust. Uggla vid minnesfesten med 1860-talets kadetter den 30 mars 1895 (in Swedish). Stockholm. SELIBR 2207506.
- Uggla, Gustaf (1905). Tal vid minnesfesten med forna kadetter den 6 april 1905 (in Swedish). Stockholm. SELIBR 3115246.
- Uggla, Gustaf (1914). Sveriges sjöförsvar: synpunkter. Föreningen Sveriges flottas småskrifter, 99-3366728-9; 11 (in Swedish). Stockholm: Föreningen. SELIBR 1639696.
- Uggla, Gustaf (1917). Några tankar om fältskjutningen inom det frivilliga skytteväsendet (in Swedish). Eskilstuna: Eskilstuna-posten. SELIBR 1660068.

Military offices
Preceded by Carl Lagercrantz	Svea Life Guards; 1897–1902	Succeeded by Carl Rosenblad
Preceded by Carl Bror Munck af Fulkila	2nd Army Division; 1902–1913	Succeeded by Lars Tingsten
Court offices
Preceded by Carl Warberg	Chief of His Majesty's Military Staff; 1910–1923	Succeeded by Carl August Ehrensvärd
