= Lance Uggla =

British Canadian businessman

Lance Uggla CBE
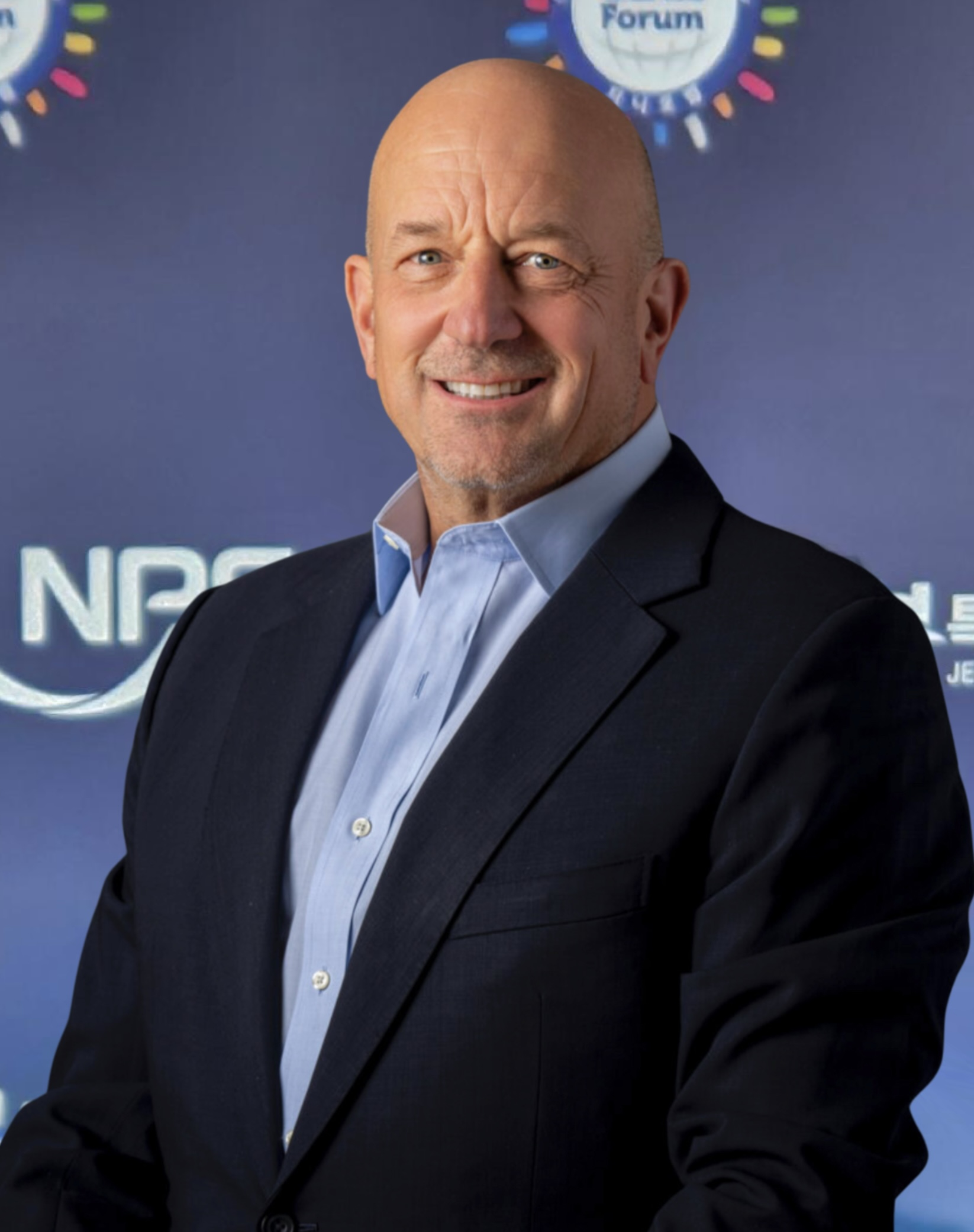
- Born: Lance Darrell Gordon Uggla; 1962 (age 63–64); Burnaby, British Columbia, Canada
- Citizenship: British and Canadian
- Education: Simon Fraser University (BBA); London School of Economics (MSc)
- Occupations: Business executive, philanthropist
- Years active: 1986–present
- Board member of: Mastercard (2019–present); Tate Foundation (2018–present)
- Children: 4, including Riley Uggla and Matthew Uggla
- Family: Uggla family

Lance Darrell Gordon Uggla CBE (born 1962) is a British Canadian businessman and philanthropist. He founded Markit, a financial information and analytics provider, and was chairman and chief executive officer of IHS Markit, the company formed by Markit's 2016 merger with IHS, until its acquisition by S&P Global in February 2022. In 2021, he co-founded BeyondNetZero, a climate-focused growth equity fund launched with General Atlantic, where he is CEO and vice chairman. In 2026, Uggla was appointed a CBE for services to business and philanthropy.

== Early life ==
Uggla was born in 1962 in Burnaby, British Columbia, Canada. His father was a sawmill manager. He received his early education from Garibaldi Secondary School.

Uggla earned a Bachelor of Business Administration from Simon Fraser University in 1985 and a Master of Science in accounting and finance from the London School of Economics in 1986.

== Career ==
Uggla began his career in Toronto at CIBC, where he rose to Head of Global Markets in 1986, and later served at TD Securities in London as Head of Europe and Asia and co-head of credit trading. During his tenure as a trader at TD Securities in the 1990s, Uggla began compiling a database of prices for illiquid credit assets.

The collapse of Enron in 2001 highlighted a widespread need for independent pricing data, leading him to found Markit (initially branded as Markit.com and later renamed Markit Partners to avoid dot-com-era associations). Markit initially operated from a barn north of London to provide daily pricing services for credit default swaps.

Both the early-2000s market downturn and the 2008 financial crisis further increased demand from traders and regulators for greater transparency in opaque markets. In 2012, Uggla was named Ernst & Young UK Entrepreneur of the Year. Under his leadership, Markit positioned itself alongside established providers such as Bloomberg and Thomson Reuters, differentiating itself as a content supplier rather than a terminal service. In 2016, Markit completed a $13 billion merger with IHS, adding assets such as Jane's Defence Weekly to its portfolio. He served as president of IHS Markit from July 2016 to December 2017.

In November 2020, S&P Global agreed to acquire IHS Markit for approximately $44 billion in stock, a transaction that closed in February 2022. Following the acquisition, Uggla stepped down as CEO and remained as a special advisor for a year.

In 2021, Uggla co-founded BeyondNetZero, the climate-change investment arm of General Atlantic, becoming its CEO in 2022 while also serving as vice chair of General Atlantic. He has held independent directorships at Mastercard since 2019 and has been a trustee of the Tate Foundation since 2018.

== Philanthropy ==
Uggla and his family have supported education and social mobility through a range of philanthropic commitments. In 2020, he donated C$34.1 million to Simon Fraser University to establish the Uggla Family Scholarship program for under-represented undergraduates, the largest gift in the university's history. At the same time, he pledged £23.4 million to the London School of Economics to endow the Uggla Family Scholars Programme, its largest scholarship donation, aimed at financially disadvantaged students. With the Uggla Family Foundation, the family has funded multiple youth and education projects, including Zamcog, a school in Zambia for street children.

In 2023, the Uggla Foundation also provided funding to the British Film Institute to expand its educational and streaming programs for UK audiences.

== Personal life ==
Lance is a member of the Uggla family, a Swedish noble lineage. His daughter, Riley Uggla, is a fashion designer and a former Made in Chelsea cast member. His son, Matthew, extended the family's interests into sport when their company, 394 Sports Ltd, acquired a 51% stake in York City F.C. in June 2023.

== Awards and recognition ==
- 2012: Ernst & Young UK Entrepreneur of the Year
- 2013: Outstanding Alumni Award for Professional Achievement
- 2026: Commander of the Order of the British Empire
