= Military Academy Karlberg =

Swedish military academy

Coordinates: 59°20′26″N 18°01′11″E

- Militärhögskolan Karlberg
- Motto: Ihärdighet - Segervisshet
- Motto in English: "Persistence - Certainty of victory"
- March: "Narvamarsch" (von Düben) (Note: The march was established on 17 March 1999.)
- Type: Military academy
- Established: 1792
- Officer in charge: COL Jerker Sundström
- Administrative staff: 120
- Undergraduates: 300
- Location: Stockholm, Stockholm County, Sweden
- Campus: Karlberg Palace
- Website: www.forsvarsmakten.se/en/

Military Academy Karlberg (Swedish: Militärhögskolan Karlberg, MHS K) is a Swedish military academy, since its inauguration in 1792 in operation in the Karlberg Palace in Solna, just north of central Stockholm. It is thus the oldest military academy in the world to remain in its original location.

Swedish cadets join the academy as part of their three-year training as do officers aspiring to become navy lieutenants or army and air force captains.

As of 2007, the academy employs approximately 150 people and train some 300 officers annually. Notwithstanding Karlberg being a military institution, the palace and its park, classified as a historical monument of national interest, is accessible to the general public.

== History ==
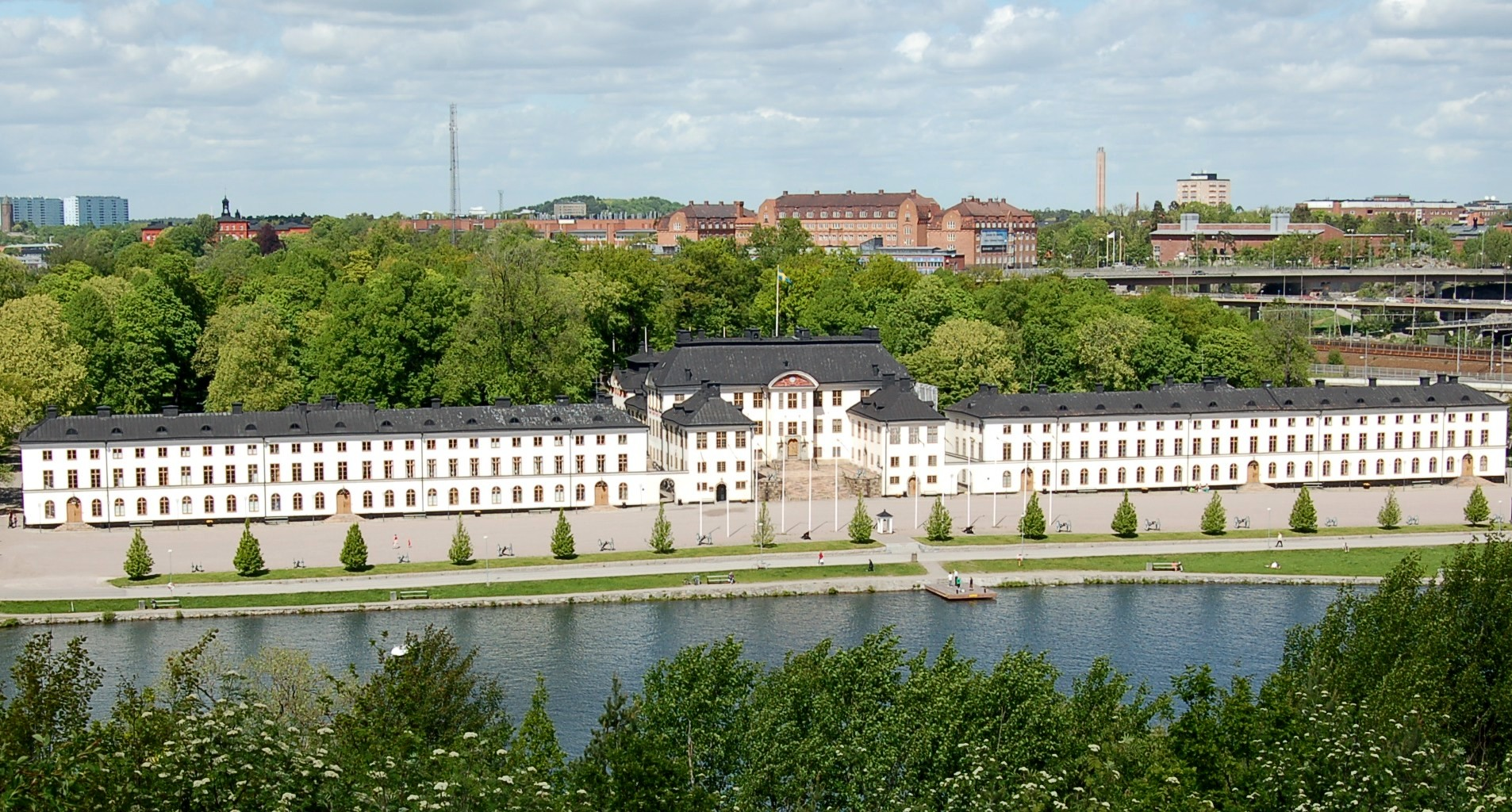
Karlberg Palace

King Gustav III's ambitions to establish an academy for cadets at Ulriksdal Palace were cancelled following his death in 1792 as his wife Queen Sophia Magdalena wished to have that palace as a private residence. The Kungliga Krigsacademien ("Royal War Academy") was subsequently relocated to Karlberg Palace, the former royal summer residence, where the first generation of cadets began their education in November the same year.

Shortly after the death of the king, during the regency of Gustav IV Adolf, an enlargement was found necessary to accommodate the officers and construction work on the elongated pavilions of the palace commenced the following year to be accomplished to the design of Carl Christoffer Gjörwell three years later.

Until 1867 both navy and army cadets were educated at Karlberg, after which the two military educations were separated for 132 years before being unified again in 1999, since 2003 accompanied by air force officers.

== Heraldry and traditions ==
=== Colours, standards and guidons ===
As of 2012, the Military Academy Karlberg has carried a total of six colours since 1817. The first was presented by His Majesty the King in Rikssalen ("Hall of State") at Karlberg Palace on 6 March 1817. Thereafter, the king has presented colours in 1842, 1920, 1952 and at the school's 200th anniversary on 23 May 1992.

The 1992 colour of the Military Academy Karlberg was presented to the former Military Academy (Krigsskolan Karlberg, KS) at Karlberg Palace in Solna by His Majesty the King Carl XVI Gustaf at the 200-years school anniversary on 23 May 1992. It was drawn by Ingrid Lamby and embroidered by machine in insertion technique by the company Libraria. Blazon: "On blue cloth in the centre, an erect white rapier of Gustaf II Adolf pattern surmounted an open yellow chaplet of laurels and in the second and fourth corners the year 1792 divided with two yellow figures in each corner."

On 18 November 2021, a new colour was presented to Military Academy Karlberg at Karlberg Palace in Solna by His Majesty the King Carl XVI Gustaf.

=== Coat of arms ===
The coat of the arms of the Military Academy Karlberg (KS) 1977–1983, the Swedish Army Staff College (Arméns krigshögskola, AKHS) 1983–1994, the Military Academy Karlberg (KS) 1994–1999 and the Military Academy Karlberg (MHS K) from 1999. Blazon: "Azure, an erect rapier argent inside an open chaplet of laurels or. In field III and IV the year 1792 with two figures each field of the last colour".

=== Medals ===
In 2003, the Militärhögskolan Karlbergs (MHS K) förtjänstmedalj ("Military Academy Karlberg (MHS K) Medal of Merit") in gold, silver and bronze (MHSKGM/SM/BM) of the 8th size was established. The medal ribbon is of blue moiré with a yellow and a red stripe on each side. A wreath of laurel in gold/silver is attached to the ribbon.

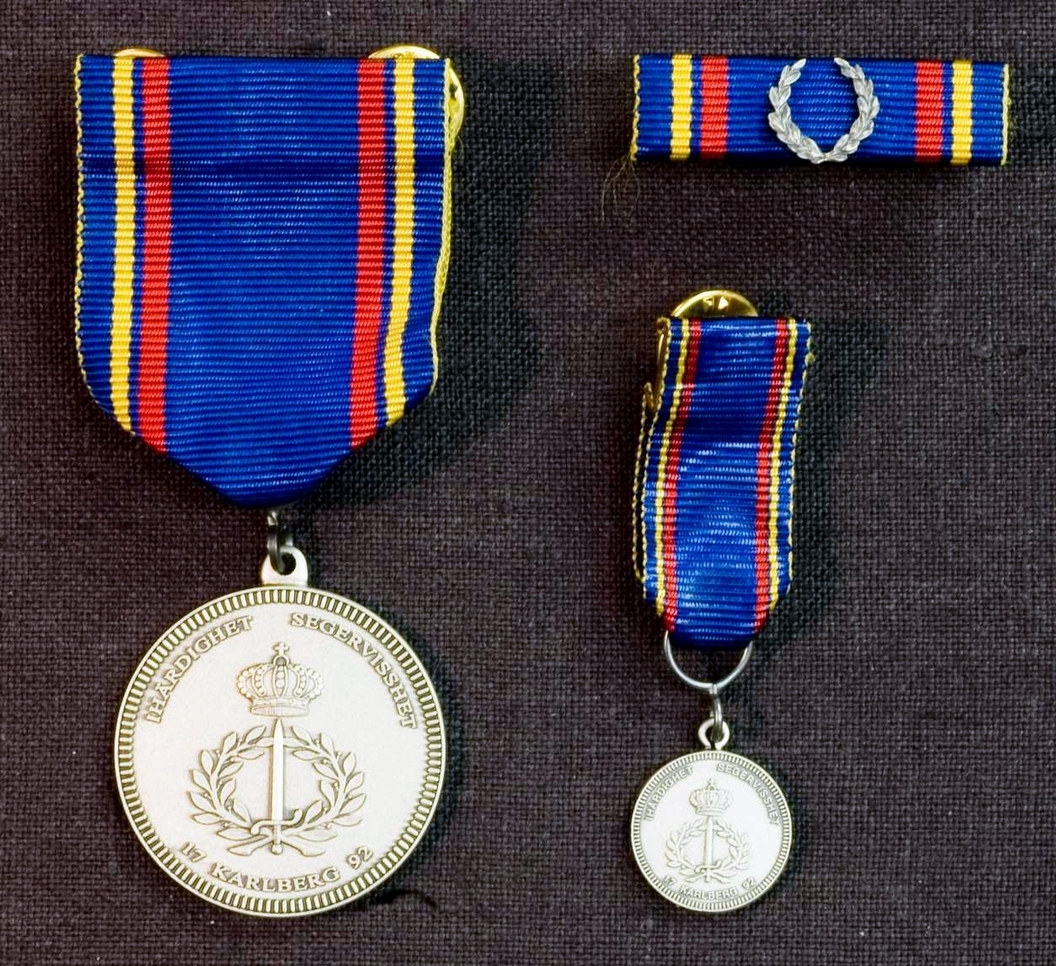
Military Academy Karlberg Medal of Merit in silver with ribbon and miniature medal (obverse)

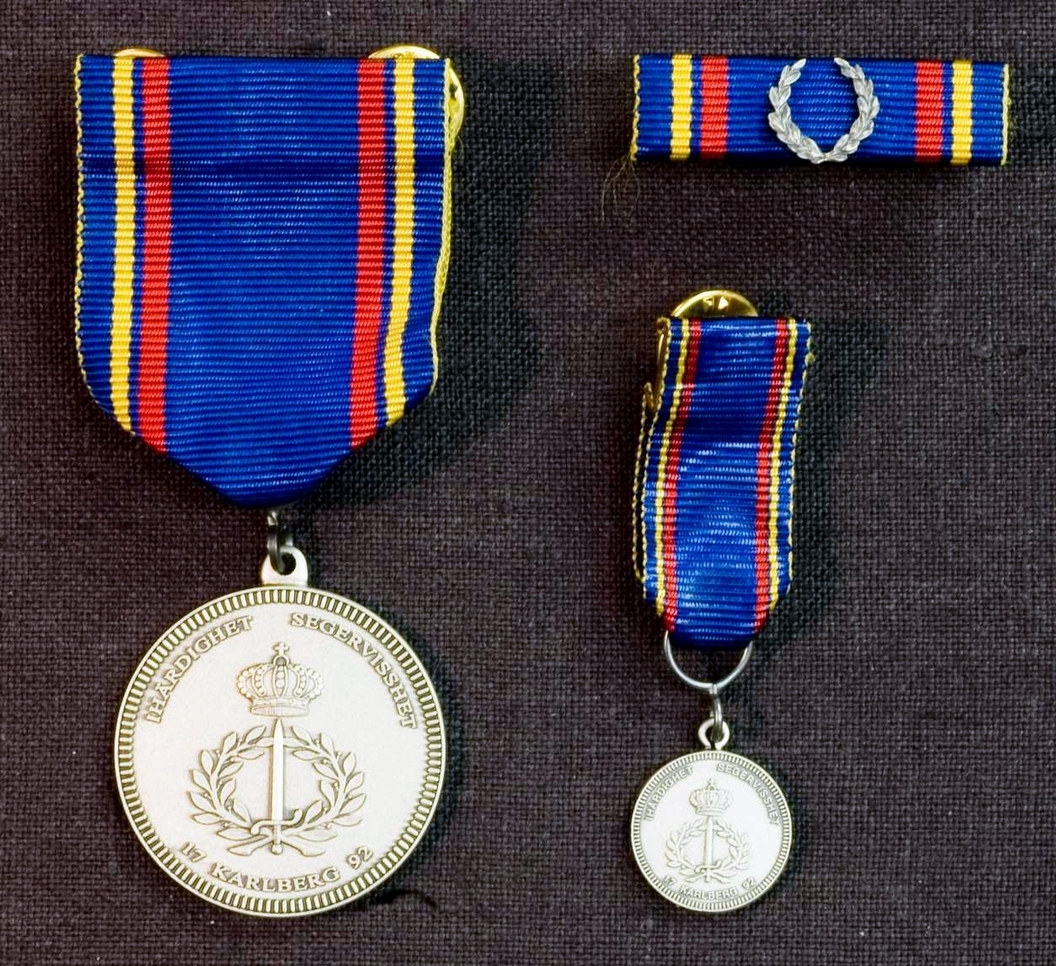
Military Academy Karlberg Medal of Merit in silver with ribbon and miniature medal (reverse)

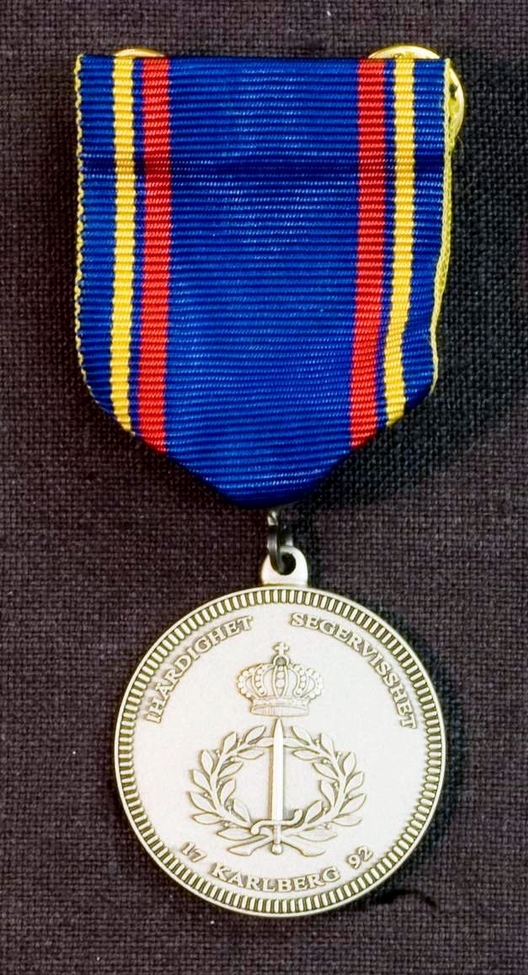
Military Academy Karlberg Medal of Merit in silver

Ribbon bar of the Military Academy Karlberg Medal of Merit

== Heads ==
- 1792–1793: Governor Major general Peter Bernhard Piper
- 1793–1824: Governor Major general Count Nils August Cronstedt
- 1824–1839: Governor General Johan Lefrén
- 1839–1850: Governor Colonel Adolf Ammilon
- 1850–1861: Governor Lieutenant general Magnus Thulstrup
- 1861–1865: Governor Colonel Carl Gustaf Lagercrantz
- 1865–1875: Governor Colonel Lars Johan Malcolm Reenstierna
- 1875–1882: Colonel Count Gustaf Snoilsky
- 1882–1890: Colonel Henning Thulstrup
- 1890–1897: Lieutenant colonel Gustaf Uggla
- 1897–1901: Colonel Hans Alexander Gustaf Altvater Pantzerhielm
- 1901–1906: Lieutenant colonel Baron Adolf Fredrik Constantin Fock
- 1906–1912: Lieutenant general Baron Vilhelm Rappe
- 1912–1916: Colonel Gustaf Bouveng
- 1916–1921: Colonel Erik Nordenskjöld
- 1921–1926: Lieutenant colonel Tage af Klercker
- 1926–1930: Colonel Carl Uggla
- 1930–1933: Colonel Ernst af Klercker
- 1933–1937: Colonel Karl Gustaf Emanuel Brandel
- 1937–1940: Major general Gustaf Petri
- 1940–1944: Colonel Bertil Uggla
- 1944–1947: Colonel Gilbert Nordqvist
- 1947–1949: Major general Carl Fredrik Reinhold Lemmel
- 1949–1953: Colonel Malcolm Murray
- 1953–1958: Major general Bengt Carl Olof Hjelm
- 1958–1964: Colonel Anders Grafström
- 1964–1969: Colonel Nils-Ivar Carlborg
- 1969–1973: Senior colonel Gösta Gärdin
- 1973–1974: Major general Bengt Liljestrand
- 1974–1976: Senior colonel Gunnar Olov Johannes Hallström
- 1976–1980:Senior colonel Rolf Frykhammar
- 1980–1983: Lieutenant general Curt Sjöö
- 1983–1988: Senior colonel Matts Uno Liljegren
- 1988–1992: Colonel Knut Anders Gustaf Anerud
- 1992–1997: Colonel Lars Björkman
- 1997–1998: Colonel Urban Staaff
- 1999–2001: Colonel Jan-Axel Thomelius
- 2002–2004: Colonel Bengt Nylander
- 2005–2008: Colonel Urban Molin
- 2008–2009: Lieutenant colonel mst Mats Alnevik
- 2009–2013: Colonel Mats Danielsson
- 2013–2014: Lieutenant colonel mst Mats Alnevik
- 2014–2016: Colonel Rikard Askstedt
- 2016–2019: Captain (N) Anna-Karin Broth
- 2019–2021: Captain (N) Bo Berg
- 2021–2024: Colonel Roger Nilsson
- 2024–present: Colonel Jerker Sundström

== Names, designations and locations ==
Name	Translation	From		To
Kungliga Krigsakademien	Royal War Academy	1792-??-??	–	1863-??-??
Kungliga Krigsskolan	Royal Military Academy	1863-??-??	–	1974-12-31
Krigsskolan	Military Academy Karlberg	1975-01-01	–	1998-12-31
Militärhögskolan Karlberg	Military Academy Karlberg	1999-01-01	–	
Designation		From		To
KS		1863-??-??	–	1998-12-31
MHS K		1999-01-01	–	
Location		From		To
Karlberg Palace		1792-??-??	–	

== See also ==
- Swedish Defence University
- List of universities in Sweden
