= Mats Danielsson =

Swedish officer (born 1962)

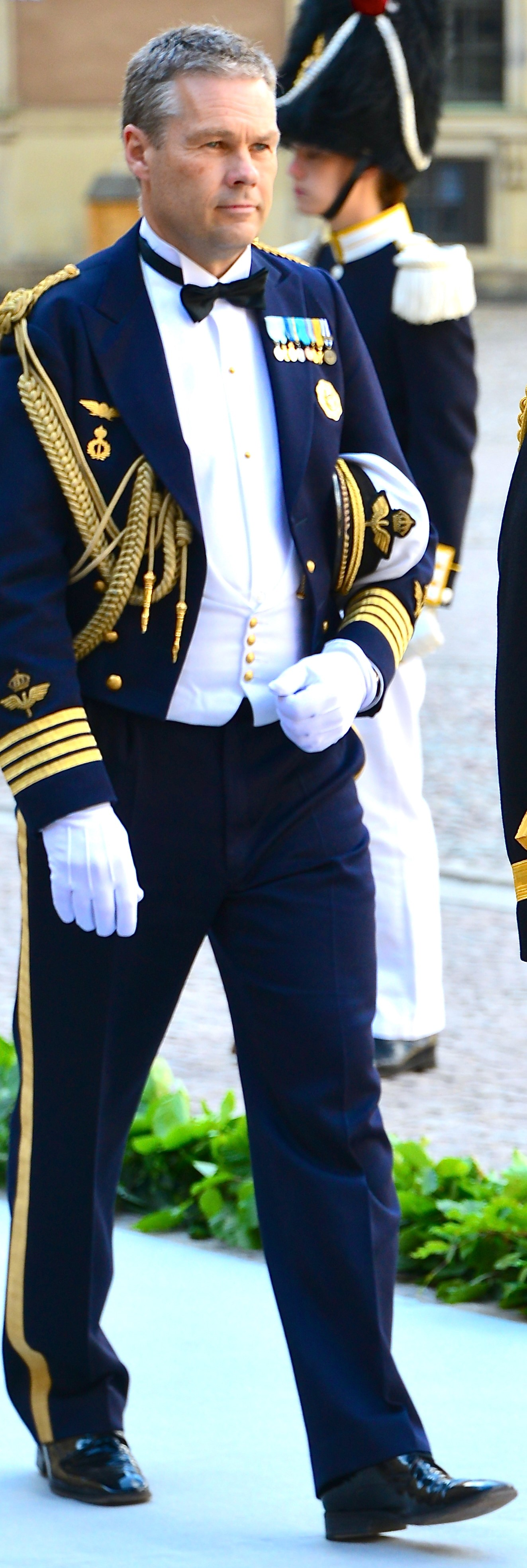
- Born: 20 June 1962 (age 64); Porjus, Sweden
- Military career
- Allegiance: Swedish Armed Forces
- Branch: Swedish Air Force
- Service years: 1980–2019
- Rank: Colonel
- Commands: FS13; Military Academy Karlberg
- Conflicts: War in Afghanistan

Colonel Mats Danielsson (born 20 June 1962) is a retired Swedish officer. He served as the Swedish ISAF troops in Afghanistan during the War in Afghanistan. He was the head of the Military Academy Karlberg from 2009 to 2013.

== Early life ==
Danielsson was born on 20 June 1962 in Porjus Parish, Norrbotten County, Sweden.

== Career ==
=== Military career ===
Danielsson graduated from the Military Academy Karlberg in 1980 and was commissioned as an officer the same year with the rank of second lieutenant in Norrland Dragoon Regiment, where he served until 1988 in positions from instructor to platoon leader. He was promoted to lieutenant in 1984 and to captain in 1987. From 1988 to 1989 he was a teacher at the Infantry and Cavalry Officers’ College (Infanteriets och Kavalleriets officershögskola, Inf/KavOHS). In 1989 he joined the Air Force with service in Norrbotten Wing, first as deputy company commander from 1989 to 1990 and then as company commander from 1990. He then served on the staff of Northern Military District and at the Swedish Armed Forces Headquarters in Stockholm. In 1998, he was promoted to major. After being promoted to lieutenant colonel, he served from 2000 to 2002 as adjutant to the Supreme Commander of the Swedish Armed Forces, General Johan Hederstedt. After that he served again at Norrbotten Wing, including as Chief of Staff from 2004 to 2005 and deputy wing commander from 2005 to 31 December 2008. After being promoted to colonel, Danielsson served from April to November 2007 as commander of the Swedish operation in Afghanistan (FS13).

Danielsson was head of the Military Academy Karlberg from 1 January 2009 to 2013. From 2013 to 2016, he was defense attaché at the Swedish Embassy in London. Since 1 November 2016, Danielsson has special assignments for the Chief of Air Force and the commander of the Air Combat Training School (Luftstridsskolan, LSS). Danielsson retired in November 2019.

Danielsson has been ADC to His Majesty the King from 2002.

=== Business career ===
Danielsson worked as a senior consultant at MD Consulting from December 2019 to April 2020. He is a senior advisor at Pansanté since April 2020.

== Awards and decorations ==
Danielsson's awards:

=== Swedish ===
- (Sweden) For Zealous and Devoted Service of the Realm
- (Sweden) Swedish Armed Forces Conscript Medal
- (Sweden) H. M. The King's Medal (28 January 2007), 8th size gold (silver-gilt) medal worn on the chest suspended by the Order of the Seraphim ribbon, for his service as the king's adjutant.
- (Sweden) Crown Princess Victoria and Prince Daniel's Wedding Commemorative Medal
- (Sweden) Swedish Armed Forces International Service Medal
- (Sweden) Norrbotten Wing Medal of Merit (Norrbottens flygflottiljs (F 21) förtjänstmedalj, NorrbffljGM)
- (Sweden) Military Academy Karlberg (MHS K) Medal of Merit in Gold (Militärhögskolan Karlbergs (MHS K) förtjänstmedalj i guld, MHSKGM)

=== Foreign ===
- NATO Non-Article 5 medal
- (Netherlands) Medal for the International Four Days Marches Nijmegen

== Dates of rank ==
- 1980 – Second lieutenant
- 1984 – Lieutenant
- 1987 – Captain
- 1998 – Major
- 2000 – Lieutenant colonel
- 2007 – Colonel
