= Garibaldi Secondary School =

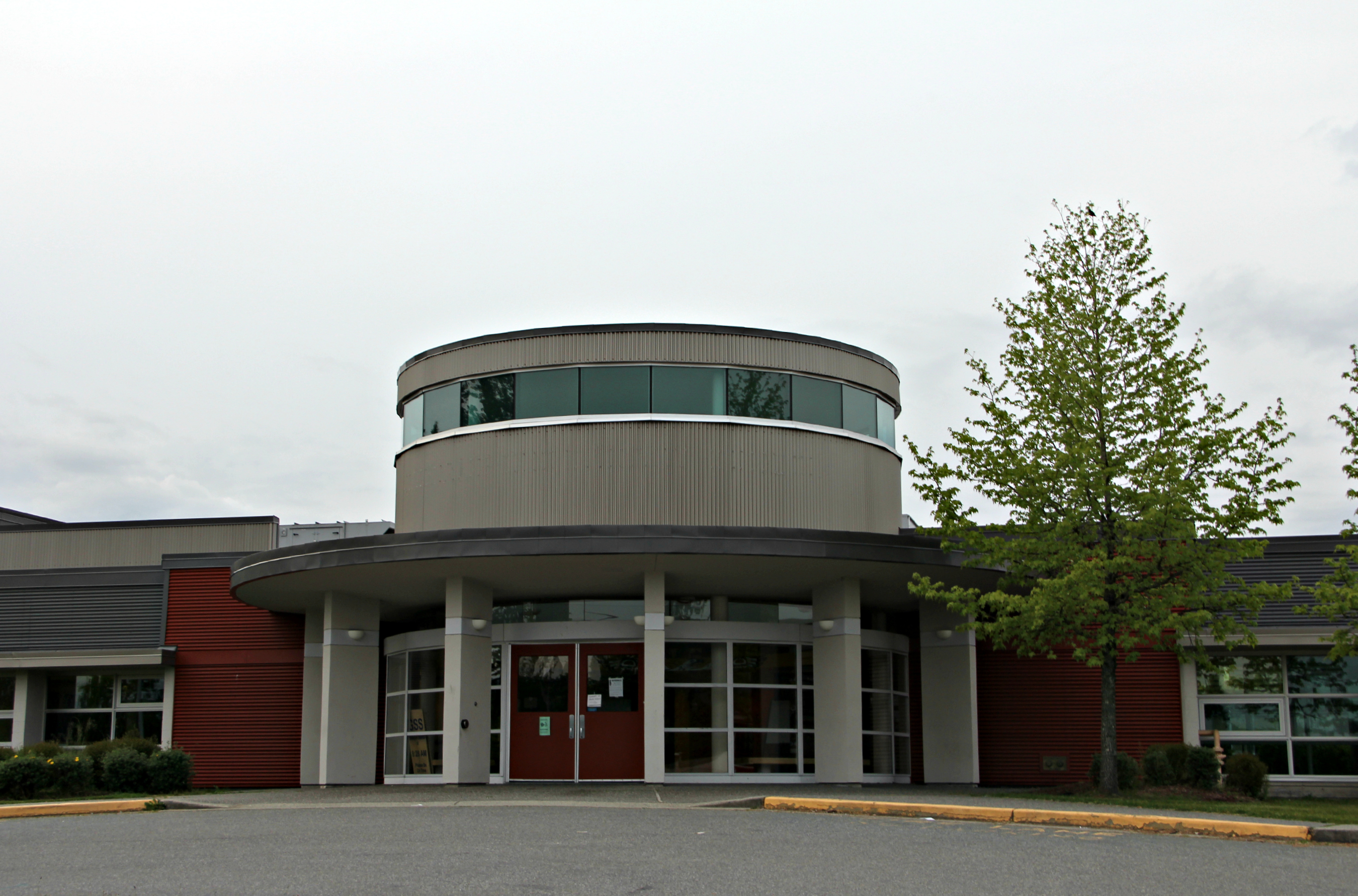

Location
- 24789 Dewdney Trunk Rd; Maple Ridge, British Columbia, V4R 1X2; Canada; 49.22154°N 122.53643°W

Information
- School type: Public, high school
- Motto: Carpe diem ("Seize the day")
- Founded: 1956
- School board: School District 42 Maple Ridge-Pitt Meadows
- School number: 4242002
- Principal: Ian Liversidge
- Staff: 50
- Grades: 8-12
- Enrollment: 800 (10 September 2015)
- Language: English
- Colours: Blue, gold and silver
- Mascot: Grizzly
- Team name: Rebels
- Website: gss.sd42.ca
- Last updated: September, 2015

Garibaldi Secondary School is a grade 8–12 school located in Maple Ridge, British Columbia, Canada. The school presently has about 1,040 students, and 62 teachers.

== International Baccalaureate ==
Garibaldi Secondary School (GSS) is an International Baccalaureate World School for the IB Diploma Programme since October 2007. The first International Baccalaureate diploma classes started in 2008. Garibaldi is the only public school in Maple Ridge to offer the IB Diploma Programme. The school also offers courses in the junior grades to help prepare students for the IB Diploma Programme.

== Other programs ==
In addition to its academic programs, Garibaldi Secondary has Fine Arts programs such as Drama, Video Editing, Music and Art; Technical Partnership programs such as Electrical, Plumbing, Carpentry, Traditional Metalwork, and Woodwork; and Business and Information Technology programs such as Economics, Business Computer Applications, Desktop Publishing, Marketing, and Information Technology.

== Online learning ==
The school has been involved from the start in the District's Distance Learning Program the Connected Learning Community(CLC) which offers courses online to students all over British Columbia. Several teachers conduct online courses using various programs including Moodle and recently Second Life.

== History ==
The original school was built in 1956 when it was named after Garibaldi Provincial Park which was just to the North of the school. Later this part of the park became a separate park known as Golden Ears Provincial Park but the school kept the name Garibaldi Secondary School, so it is also named after Giuseppe Garibaldi. The school has completed its building program with new classrooms, science labs and computer labs.

== Notable alumni ==
- Linus Sebastian, YouTube personality, presenter, producer, and founder of Linus Media Group.
- Snak the Ripper, musician, record producer and founder of Stealth Bomb Records.
- Brian Malfesi, sprint kayaker, and member of Canada's 2020 Olympic team.
- Lance Uggla, CEO and chairman of IHS Markit.
- Tyler O'Neill, MLB player for the Boston Red Sox.
