= Tyler O'Neill =

Canadian baseball player (born 1995)

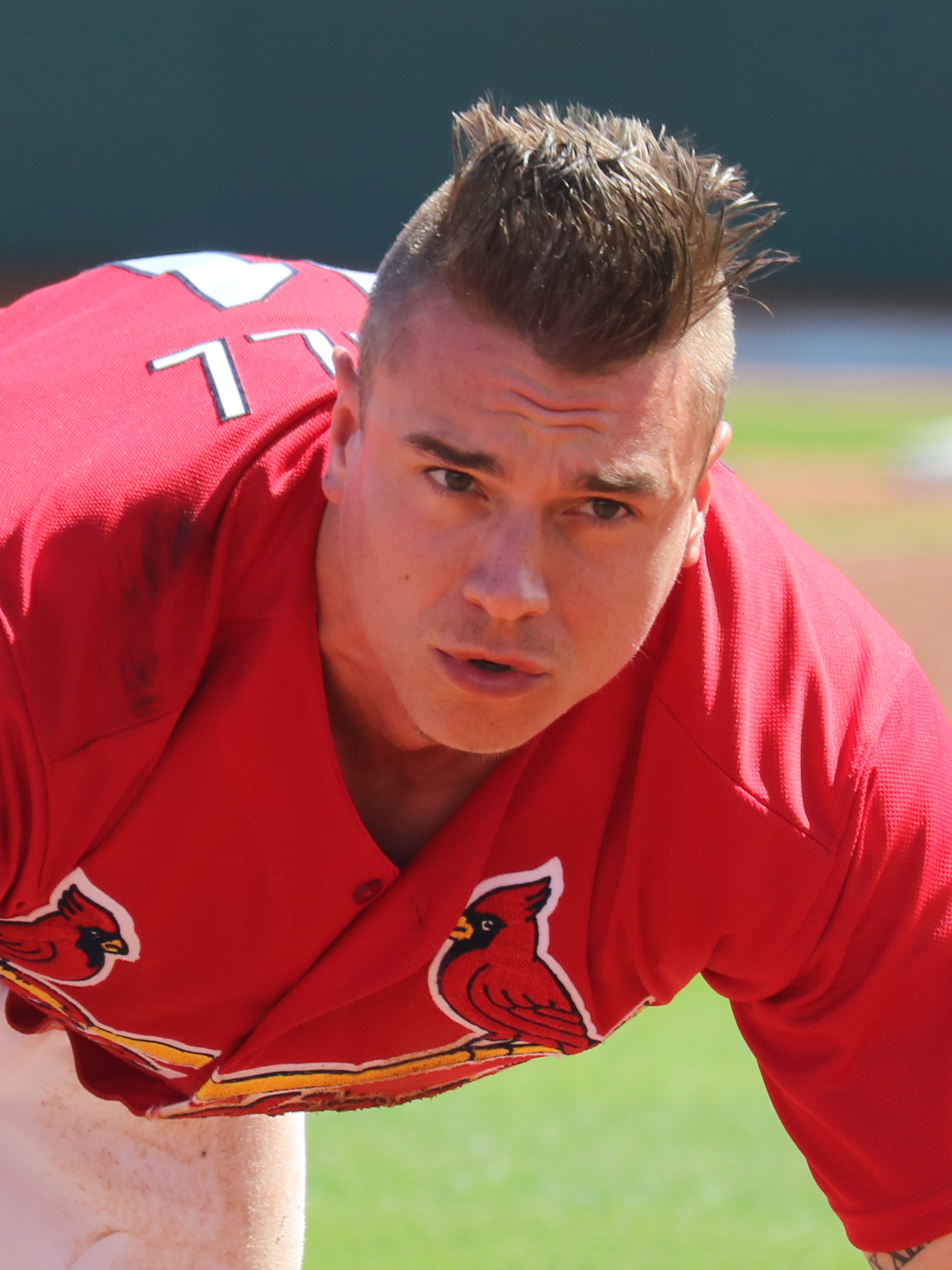
- O'Neill with the St. Louis Cardinals in 2019

Baltimore Orioles – No. 9
- Outfielder
- Born: June 22, 1995 (age 31); Burnaby, British Columbia, Canada
- Bats: Right Throws: Right

MLB debut
- April 19, 2018, for the St. Louis Cardinals

MLB statistics (through 2026 season)
- Batting average: .239
- Home runs: 128
- Runs batted in: 327
- Stats at Baseball Reference

Teams
- St. Louis Cardinals (2018–2023); Boston Red Sox (2024); Baltimore Orioles (2025–present)

Career highlights and awards
- 2× Gold Glove Award (2020, 2021)
Medals
Men's baseball
Representing Canada
Pan American Games
Gold medal – first place	2015 Toronto	Team

Tyler Alan O'Neill (born June 22, 1995) is a Canadian professional baseball outfielder for the Baltimore Orioles of Major League Baseball (MLB). He has previously played in MLB for the St. Louis Cardinals and Boston Red Sox. He has represented Canada in international play, winning a gold medal at the 2015 Pan American games. Listed at 5 feet 11 inches (1.80 m) and 210 pounds (95 kg), he throws and bats right-handed.

The Seattle Mariners selected O'Neill in the third round of the 2013 MLB draft. In 2016, he was the Southern League Most Valuable Player (MVP). On July 21, 2017, the Mariners traded him to the Cardinals. After making his MLB debut in 2018, O'Neill struggled with injuries and split time between MLB and the minor leagues for two seasons before he became the Cardinals' starting left fielder in 2020, winning his first of his two Gold Glove Awards.

== Early life and amateur career ==
O'Neill attended Garibaldi Secondary School in Maple Ridge, British Columbia, and played for the Langley Blaze of the British Columbia Premier Baseball League. He grew up a fan of the Seattle Mariners of Major League Baseball (MLB).

== Professional career ==
=== Seattle Mariners ===
The Seattle Mariners selected O'Neill in the third round of the 2013 MLB draft. He signed with the Mariners and made his professional debut with the Arizona League Mariners. In 2014, O'Neill played in only 51 games between the Arizona League Mariners, Everett AquaSox, and Clinton LumberKings because he broke a bone in his right hand by punching a concrete wall in the dugout. He spent 2015 with the Bakersfield Blaze, where he posted a .260 batting average along with 32 home runs and 87 RBIs.

He spent 2016 with the Jackson Generals of the Southern League, where he batted .293 with 24 home runs and 102 RBIs. Jackson won the Southern League championship after a league best 84–55 record, and O'Neill was the Southern League Most Valuable Player (MVP). In seven playoff contests, he batted .448, three home runs and eight RBIs. He began 2017 with the Tacoma Rainiers of the Class AAA Pacific Coast League (PCL).

=== St. Louis Cardinals ===
==== 2017 ====
On July 21, 2017, the St. Louis Cardinals acquired O'Neill for pitcher Marco Gonzales and assigned him to the Memphis Redbirds of the PCL.

O'Neill finished 2017 with a combined .246 batting average, 31 home runs, and 95 RBIs in 130 games between Tacoma and Memphis. The Redbirds became the 2017 PCL champions after defeating the El Paso Chihuahuas in five games in the league championship final, giving O'Neill consecutive minor league championships with two organizations at two levels. The Cardinals added him to their 40-man roster after the season to protect him from being chosen in the Rule 5 Draft.

==== 2018 ====
MLB.com ranked O'Neill as St Louis' fourth-best prospect going into the 2018 season. He competed in spring training, seeking to make the major league roster as a reserve, but hamstring and oblique injuries meant he began the season with Memphis. He was promoted to MLB on April 19, 2018. He had been leading the PCL with six home runs and 18 RBI. He made his MLB debut the next night at Wrigley Field against the Chicago Cubs, making him the sixth Canadian-born player to appear on an active MLB roster on the season. He was sent back down on April 28 after seven hitless at-bats, then recalled again on May 18. He mustered his first MLB hit, a single off Yacksel Ríos of the Philadelphia Phillies that night in a 12–4 St. Louis win. O'Neill hit his first MLB home run the next day off Luis García. On May 21, he amassed his first four-RBI game, and homered in his third consecutive game the following day. He was optioned back to Memphis on May 31 and was recalled by St. Louis for the second time on July 2 to take the spot of Dexter Fowler, who had gone on paternity leave. He was placed on the 10-day disabled list on July 5 with a hamstring strain, was activated on June 17, and was optioned back to Memphis. He was recalled once again on July 31 following the trade of Tommy Pham, and spent the remainder of the season in St. Louis. He hit his first walk-off home run on September 22, a 414-foot shot against the San Francisco Giants, leading St. Louis to a 5–4 victory. In 61 games for the Cardinals, O'Neill batted .254 with nine home runs and 23 RBIs.

==== 2019 ====
In 2019, O'Neill made St. Louis' Opening Day roster, but his season was interrupted by injuries and more than a month in Memphis. He was recalled to St. Louis in June, and finished the year with them. In sixty games, he hit .262 with five home runs and 16 RBIs.

==== 2020 ====
O'Neill made St. Louis' Opening Day roster in 2020, and spent the whole season there starting in the outfield, slashing .173/.261/.621 with seven home runs and 19 RBIs over 139 at-bats. After the season, he was awarded his first Gold Glove Award for left field after leading major-league left fielders with nine defensive runs saved and four outs above average and not committing an error in 344 innings.

==== 2021 ====
O'Neill returned as St. Louis' starting left fielder in 2021. On September 20, O'Neill was named the National League Player of the Week after leading the Cardinals to a 6–0 week while batting .391 with three home runs, nine runs scored, and a 1.308 OPS. He was named the National League Player of the Month for September after hitting .328/.377/.731 with 13 home runs, thirty RBIs, and a 1.108 OPS. O'Neill finished the 2021 season with 482 at-bats over 138 games, slashing .286/.352/.560 with 34 home runs, eighty RBIs, and 15 stolen bases, achieving eighth in National League Most Valuable Player voting. He won his second consecutive Gold Glove Award in left field, one of five Cardinals to win that year—an MLB record.

==== 2022 ====
O'Neill opened the season as the club's starting left fielder. In mid-May, he lost his salary arbitration case against the Cardinals, resulting in a $3.4 million salary, not his requested salary of $4.15 million. He struggled to open the season, slashing .195/.256/.297 with two home runs and 42 strikeouts over 32 games before he was placed on the injured list in mid-May with a sore shoulder. He was activated on June 7. On June 20, he was placed back on the injured list with a hamstring injury before being activated in mid-July. He was placed back on the injured list with another hamstring injury in September, and missed the remainder of the season. Over 96 games with the Cardinals, he hit .228 with 14 home runs and 48 RBIs. He was sent to play for the Salt River Rafters of the Arizona Fall League after the season to rehab.

==== 2023 ====
On January 13, 2023, O'Neill agreed to a one-year, $4.95 million contract with the Cardinals, avoiding salary arbitration. O’Neill hit .228 in 29 games for St. Louis before he was placed on the injured list with a lower back strain. He was transferred to the 60-day injured list on June 16. He was activated on July 20.

O'Neill hit home runs for the Cardinals in four consecutive Opening Day games, from 2020 through 2023, tying a major-league record achieved by Todd Hundley, Gary Carter, and Yogi Berra).

=== Boston Red Sox ===
On December 8, 2023, the Cardinals traded O'Neill to the Boston Red Sox for Nick Robertson and Victor Santos. O'Neill hit a home run in Boston's Opening Day game against the Seattle Mariners, giving him five consecutive Opening Day home runs, a major-league record. O'Neill followed his record-breaking Opening Day home run with another home run against the Mariners, and three against the Los Angeles Angels on the season-opening West Coast road trip. He also hit a home run in his first at-bat at Fenway Park against the Baltimore Orioles to lead the Majors. In 133 games for the Red Sox, O'Neill slashed .241/.336/.511 with 31 home runs and 61 RBI.

=== Baltimore Orioles ===
On December 10, 2024, O'Neill signed a three–year, $49.5 million contract with the Baltimore Orioles. He hit his sixth consecutive Opening Day home run on March 27, 2025, against the Toronto Blue Jays, extending his MLB record. O'Neill played in 54 games for Baltimore during the regular season, batting .199/.292/.392 with nine home runs, 26 RBI, and four stolen bases. On November 3, O'Neill opted into the remainder of his contract with the Orioles.

O'Neill did not homer on Opening Day in 2026, ending his record streak. He played in 85 contests for the Orioles, slashing .212/.300/.377 with 10 home runs and 23 RBI. On August 26, 2026, O'Neill was placed on the injured list due to right shoulder inflammation. He was transferred to the 60–day injured list on September 19, officially ending his season.

== International career ==
O'Neill played for the Canada national team at the 2015 Pan American games in Toronto and the 2015 WBSC Premier12. In the 2015 Pan Am Games final, Canada defeated the United States 7–6 in extra innings to claim the gold medal.

== Personal life ==
O'Neill plays the piano, and entertained his teammates in the clubhouse during spring training in 2017 by playing the theme song to the "Lord of the Rings" film series on a keyboard. He has said his favourite song to play is "O Canada".

An avid weightlifter, O'Neill has been recorded on video quarter-squatting as much as 585 pounds (265 kg). He was given the nickname "Popeye" while playing in the Southern League. O'Neill's father, Terry, was named Mr. Canada (an honour given to the nation's best body builder) in 1975.

O'Neill and his wife, Stephanie, were married in December 2021 in Hawaii. In January 2023, O'Neill and Stephanie welcomed their first child.

== See also ==
- List of Major League Baseball players from Canada
- St. Louis Cardinals award winners and league leaders

Achievements
Preceded by C. J. Cron	National League Player of the Month; September 2021	Succeeded by Nolan Arenado
