= Dan Uggla =

American baseball player (born 1980)

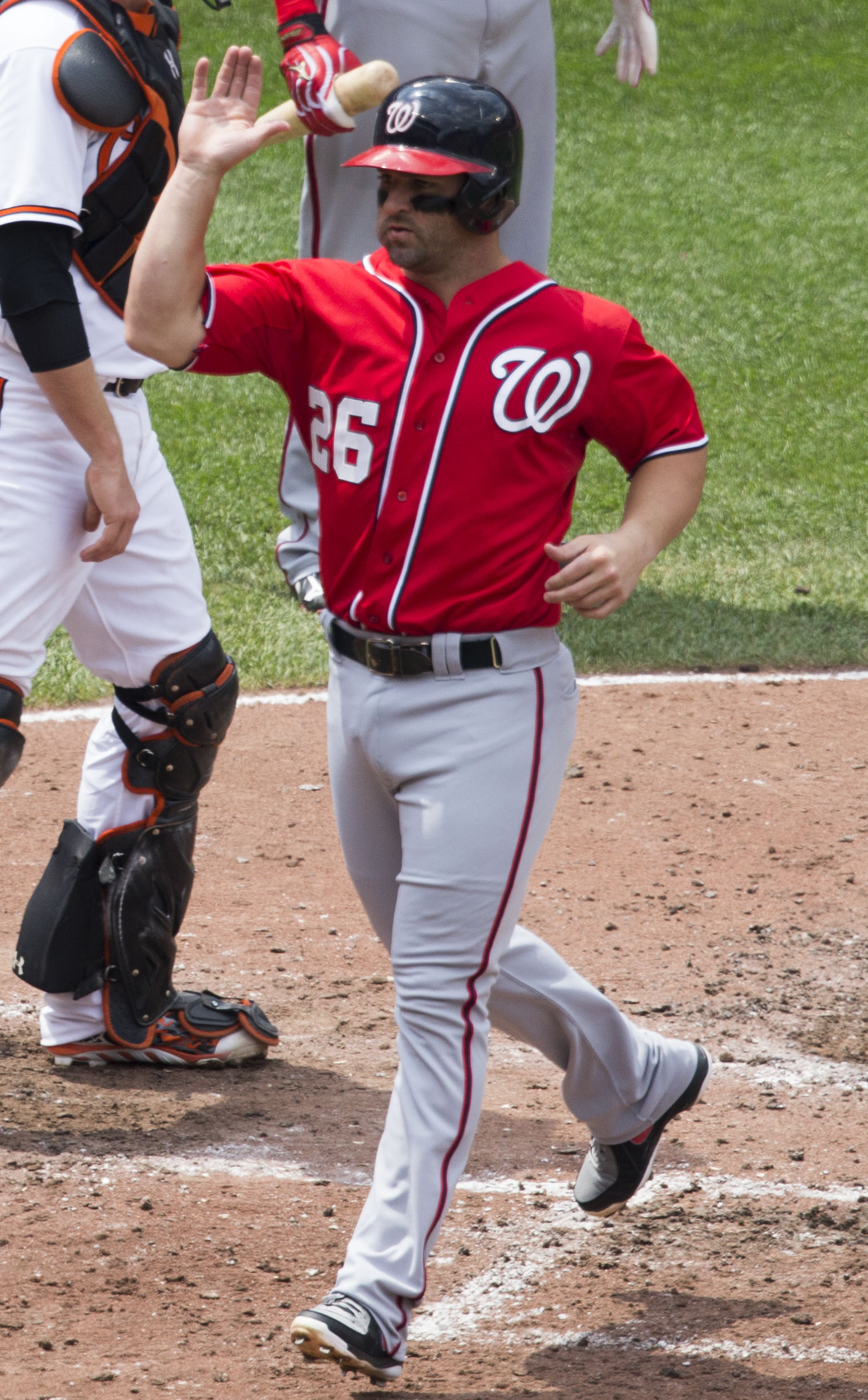
- Uggla with the Nationals in 2015
- Second baseman
- Born: March 11, 1980 (age 46); Louisville, Kentucky, U.S.
- Batted: Right Threw: Right

MLB debut
- April 3, 2006, for the Florida Marlins

Last MLB appearance
- October 3, 2015, for the Washington Nationals

MLB statistics
- Batting average: .241
- Home runs: 235
- Runs batted in: 706
- Stats at Baseball Reference

Teams
- Florida Marlins (2006–2010); Atlanta Braves (2011–2014); San Francisco Giants (2014); Washington Nationals (2015)

Career highlights and awards
- 3× All-Star (2006, 2008, 2012); Silver Slugger Award (2010)

Daniel Cooley Uggla (born March 11, 1980) is an American former professional baseball second baseman. He played in Major League Baseball (MLB) for the Florida Marlins, Atlanta Braves, San Francisco Giants, and Washington Nationals. In 2010, Uggla won the Silver Slugger Award at second base.

Uggla finished third in the 2006 National League Rookie of the Year voting, behind then-teammate and winner Hanley Ramírez, and future teammate Ryan Zimmerman of the Washington Nationals, but won the Players Choice and Sporting News NL ROY Awards. He is also the only second baseman in MLB history to hit at least 30 home runs in five consecutive seasons.

== Early life ==
Uggla was born in Louisville, Kentucky, the son of Elizabeth Armistead (née Cooley) and John Carl Uggla. He graduated from Columbia Central High School in Columbia, Tennessee, in 1998.

== College career ==
Uggla attended the University of Memphis where he played for the Memphis Tigers. After his junior season, he was named an All-American by Baseball America, Baseball Weekly, and Collegiate Baseball.

== Professional career ==
=== Arizona Diamondbacks (2001–2005) ===
==== Minor leagues ====
Drafted by the Arizona Diamondbacks in the 11th round (338th overall) of the 2001 Major League Baseball draft, Uggla spent five seasons in the Diamondbacks organization, including a year with the short season-advanced team, the Yakima Bears in Yakima, Washington. He amassed a .276 career minor league batting average, .341 on-base percentage, and .443 slugging percentage, to go along with 64 home runs, 311 runs batted in, and 62 stolen bases. Although he was 25 years old, which would make him the same age as many Triple-A players, and moderately successful in 2005, he never advanced past the Double-A level.

=== Florida Marlins (2006–2010) ===
Uggla was left off the Diamondbacks' 40-man roster in 2005, and the Marlins selected him in the Rule 5 draft.

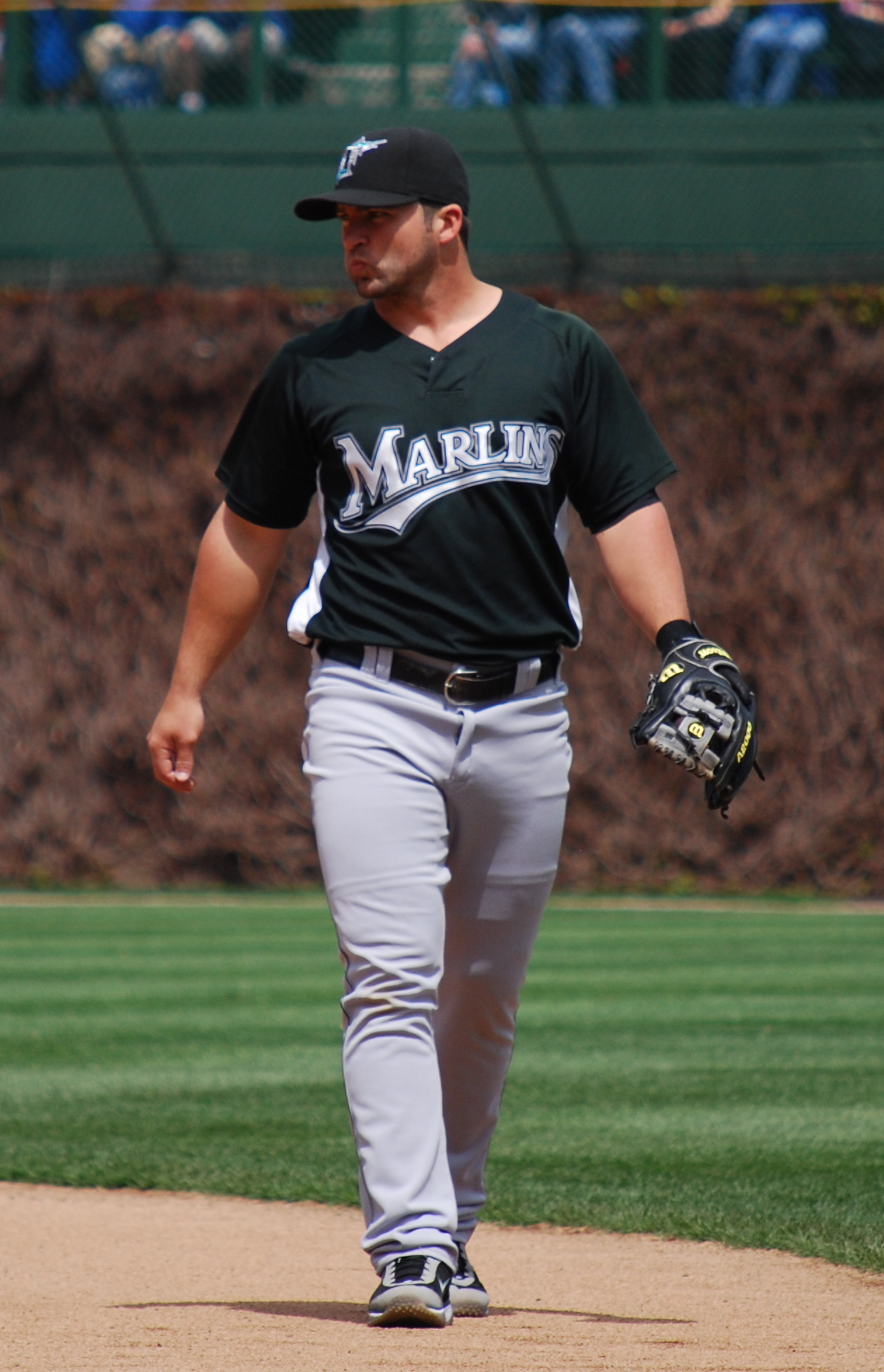
Uggla with the Florida Marlins in 2009

==== Major leagues ====
Uggla began the 2006 season with the Marlins and had his first Major League hit just three days later when he singled off Houston Astros pitcher Andy Pettitte. His first home run was on April 13 against San Diego Padres starter Dewon Brazelton, and his first stolen base was a steal of home plate against the Philadelphia Phillies on April 21. Uggla was named to the 2006 Major League Baseball All-Star Game on July 2, 2006, as a reserve; he is the first player in baseball history to be selected for the All-Star Game in the same season in which he had been a Rule 5 pick.

On September 15, 2006, Uggla hit his 25th home run, breaking Joe Gordon's record for most home runs by a rookie second baseman. Because he received less publicity as a prospect than some of his fellow rookies in Major League Baseball, such as Prince Fielder, Ryan Zimmerman, and Nick Markakis, Uggla's display of power in the majors and his selection to the National League All-Star team caused him to suddenly draw more attention. Uggla finished his rookie season with 27 homers and 90 runs batted in. He won numerous rookie awards, including the Players' Choice NL ROY award and Sporting News Rookie of the Year Award.

The Marlins finished Uggla's second season in last place. Uggla finished the year with a .245 batting average, caused mainly by slumps in April and September. However, he did surpass his rookie home run total, hitting 31 home runs and knocking in 88 runs.

On May 10, 2008, Uggla hit his first career grand slam in the fourth inning off of Nationals pitcher Joel Hanrahan. That month, he set a Marlins record for most home runs by a Marlin in a month with 12.

Uggla was named to the 2008 MLB All-Star Game at Yankee Stadium, as well as opting to take part in the 2008 Major League Baseball Home Run Derby. Uggla hit six home runs in the first round of the derby. Uggla finished fifth, tied with Grady Sizemore. In the All-Star Game, Uggla committed two consecutive errors on playable balls in the 10th inning, and a third error in the bottom of the 13th, making him the first player with three errors in a single All-Star Game. Uggla also struck out three times, and grounded into a double play. On September 28, 2008, Uggla hit the last home run ever at Shea Stadium.

During the 2008 offseason, Uggla went to arbitration with the Marlins and was awarded $5.35 million; the Marlins had offered him $4.4 million. On June 5, 2009, Uggla reached 100 career home runs in his 502nd game, faster than any other second baseman.

On January 18, 2010, Uggla signed a one-year, $7.8 million contract with the Marlins. He hit his 144th career home run on July 31, setting the Marlins all-time career mark. On September 13, 2010, he became the first second baseman in Major League history to hit 30 or more home runs in four seasons.

=== Atlanta Braves (2011–2014) ===
After the 2010 season, Uggla rejected a four-year, $48 million contract offer from the Marlins. Soon thereafter, Uggla was traded to the Atlanta Braves for infielder Omar Infante, and reliever Michael Dunn. On January 4, 2011, Uggla and the Atlanta Braves agreed to a 5-year, $62 million contract.

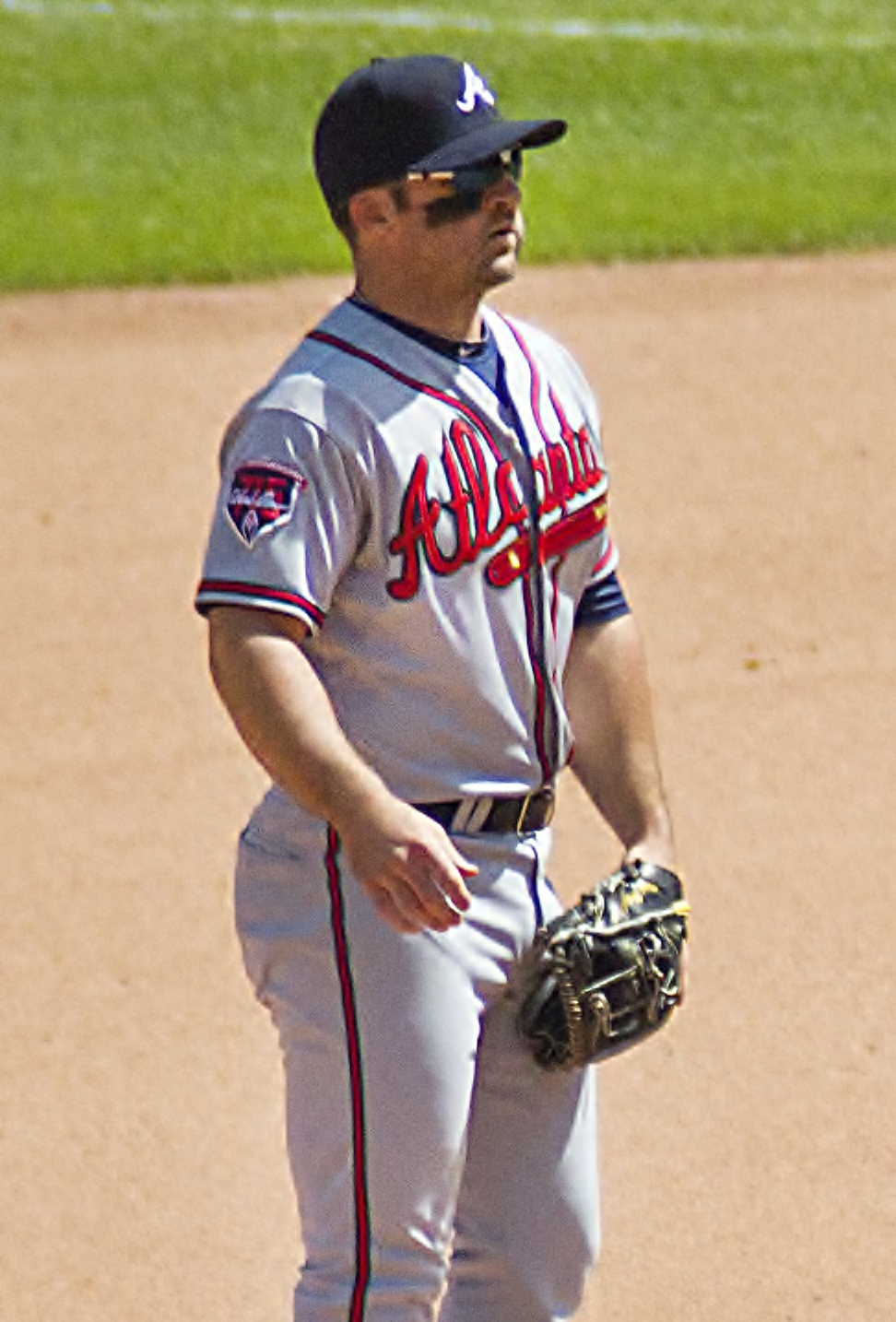
Uggla with the Atlanta Braves in 2014

During the 2011 season with the Braves, Uggla became the 23rd player in MLB history to have a hitting streak of at least 33 games. Uggla, who had gotten off to a poor start, had a .173 batting average after going hitless on July 4. The next day, he collected two hits in four at bats to start the streak. During the hitting streak, Uggla along with rookie Freddie Freeman became the first Braves in the modern era to have concurrent 20-game hitting streaks. On August 12, Uggla hit two home runs in a home game against the Chicago Cubs to break the Atlanta Braves record for longest hitting streak, which had been set by Rico Carty in 1970. He also hit a single and a home run in the next game, extending the streak to 33 games. The streak ended on August 14, 2011, after he went 0-for-3 with a sacrifice fly against the Chicago Cubs.

After the first few weeks, he raised his average over .200. Uggla hit .377 with 15 homers and 32 RBIs during his streak, which was the third-longest by a second baseman in Major League history, and the longest in the majors since 2006.

On August 22, 2011, Uggla hit his 30th home run of the season for his fifth consecutive season of 30 or more home runs. As of the 2011 season, he is the only second baseman to have hit 30 or more home runs in more than three seasons. Uggla was named National League Player of the Month for August; for the month, he was tied for the Major League and led all National Leaguers with 10 home runs. He also had 21 RBI, 33 hits, a .340 (33-for-97) batting average and a .670 slugging percentage with a .405 on-base percentage.

In 2011, Uggla hit a career high 36 home runs. On defense, he tied for the Major League lead in errors by a second baseman, with 15.

In 2012, Uggla performed poorly, with a batting average below .220 through 92 games. His power production was also down, as he hit 12 home runs through 93 games. He also struck out at a rate higher than his previous seasons. His fielding percentage of .980 was equivalent to his poor career fielding percentage. He also, however, drew walks at the highest rate of his career. This actually put his on-base percentage for the 2012 regular season at .348, tied for third best among second basemen with Marco Scutaro of the Giants, behind only Robinson Canó of the Yankees and Aaron Hill of the Diamondbacks.

2013 proved to be a difficult season for Uggla. With 80 hits in 443 plate appearances, batting .179, Uggla had the lowest batting average among qualified MLB batters and tied Rob Deer for the lowest season batting average for a player qualifying for the batting title. On October 1, the Braves announced they would leave Uggla off the 25-man roster during the playoffs.

Uggla had an average beginning to his 2014 season, hitting .237 through his first 16 games, but he really cooled off and hit .114 over his next 12 games, leading the Braves to consider other options at second base. He lost the starting job on May 8 to Ramiro Peña and Tyler Pastornicky, and eventually to Tommy La Stella by the end of May. He was released on July 18, 2014. He batted .162/.241/.231 for Atlanta in 130 at bats.

The Atlanta Braves continued to pay Uggla $19 million through the 2015 season.

=== San Francisco Giants (2014) ===
On July 21, 2014, Uggla signed a minor league contract with the San Francisco Giants and was called up four days later. He played in four games for the Giants, batting 0-for-11 and committing two fielding errors. He was designated for assignment on August 1, but rejected his assignment and three days later became a free agent.

Despite only playing four major league games for the Giants, Uggla was given a World Series ring in August 2015, as the Giants had gone on to win the 2014 World Series.

=== Washington Nationals (2015) ===
On December 26, 2014, Uggla signed a minor league contract with the Washington Nationals, that included an invitation to spring training. He made the opening day roster as second baseman. While Uggla was not a regular fixture in the Nationals' starting lineup, he played a key role in a come-from-behind victory over the Atlanta Braves, his former team, on April 28, 2015. He tripled to drive in two runs and then hit a three-run home run in the ninth to put the Nationals ahead for good. Uggla's last game was October 3, 2015, in which Max Scherzer no-hit the New York Mets in a 2–0 win. Uggla homered in his final at-bat. He batted .183/.298/.300 in 120 at-bats. The Nationals did not renew Uggla's contract at the end of the year, and he subsequently became a free agent.

== Personal life ==
The surname Uggla is Swedish in origin, one of the most numerous Swedish noble families, and means "Owl".

Uggla married Janette Repsch in December 2013. They have a daughter and a son together. He has two children from a previous marriage.

== See also ==
- List of Miami Marlins team records
- List of Silver Slugger Award winners at second base
- List of Major League Baseball career home run leaders
- List of Major League Baseball players with a home run in their final major league at bat
- Rule 5 draft results

Awards and achievements
Preceded by Willy Taveras	Sporting News National League Rookie of the Year; 2006	Succeeded by Ryan Braun
Preceded by Willy Taveras	Players Choice NL Most Outstanding Rookie; 2006	Succeeded by Ryan Braun
