= Hjalmar Uggla =

Soil scientist and member of anti-Nazi resistance in Poland

- Born: March 17, 1908; Warsaw, Poland
- Died: March 13, 1983 (aged 74); Olsztyn, Poland
- Citizenship: Poland
- Awards: Gold Award of the Polish Society of Soil Science Gold Award of the Polish Forest Society The award of the Meritorious Teacher of the Polish People’s Republic Knight's Cross of the Order of Polonia Restituta Officer's Cross of the Order of Polonia Restituta Righteous Among the Nations The Commander's Cross of the Order of Polonia Restituta
- Scientific career
- Fields: Soil science
- Institutions: Warsaw University of Life Sciences, Higher Agricultural School in Olsztyn

Hjalmar Frederik Karl Uggla (March 17, 1908 – March 13, 1983) was a Polish soil scientist, professor, and head of the Department of Soil Science at the Higher Agricultural School in Olsztyn (later renamed to the Academy of Agriculture and Technology, now University of Warmia and Mazury in Olsztyn). During World War II, he was a member of a Polish resistance movement. He was also awarded the Righteous Among the Nations prize.

Hjalmar Uggla was born in Warsaw in an intelligentsia family from the Swedish aristocracy residing in the nineteenth century in Finland, which at that time was part of the Russian Empire. The professor's ancestors were sent by the tsarist authorities as empire officials to the Congress Poland. After two generations, the family Polonized and during the wars clearly defined its Polish national identity.

He was the father of Andrzej Nils Uggla, a literary studies professor at Uppsala University.

== Education and scientific career ==
H. Uggla studied at the Faculty of Forestry at the Warsaw University of Life Sciences (SGGW), from which he graduated in 1933. By 1929, he started working as an assistant at this university's Department of Soil Science. Between 1935 and 1939, he was working as a soil classifier in Polesia and Kuyavia. Between 1940 and 1945, he was employed on the Central Experimental Silk Station farm in Milanówek. After the war, he returned to academic work at the Warsaw University of Life Sciences. After defending his doctoral thesis in 1950, he became the organizer and director of the Department of Soil Science at the newly founded Higher School of Agriculture in Olsztyn. He studied mainly hydrogenic soils and forest soils, among others on cartography and soil classification, erosion and soil protection. He was perceived as one of the creators of the ecological direction in pedology. He was an author of over 130 scientific publications and five academic textbooks and an organizer and active member of the Olsztyn branch of Soil Science Society of Poland.

== Wartime activities ==
From the beginning of World War II, Hjalmar Uggla was an active member of the resistance movement – first in the Union of Armed Struggle, and then of the Home Army. He belonged to the platoon of the "Mielizna" center under the pseudonym "Sowa" ("Owl") as a paramedic in the rank of an older shooter. He took an active part in sabotage operations and taking over air discharges. Using documents of his Swedish origin and fluent knowledge of German, he intervened many times with the occupation authorities on the release of detained members of the resistance movement and other people. After the end of the Warsaw Uprising, he hid escapees (civilians, insurgents, Jews, and nuns) from a burning Warsaw in his home in Milanówek. At the end of 1944, about 50 people were hiding at the same time at the Uggla house in Milanówek. The whole family was threatened with the death penalty for this activity. Among the rescued was Kazimierz Lewartowicz, a Jew currently living in the US, together with his mother Zofia, a concert pianist, who were kept in a secret hiding place prepared specifically for this purpose. At the request of Kazimierz Lewartowicz, the Yad Vashem Memorial Institute in Jerusalem gave the title Righteous Among the Nations posthumously, Hjalmar Uggla and his wife Ludwika Uggla on May 6, 2007.

== Awards and decorations ==
- Gold Award of the Polish Society of Soil Science
- Gold Award of the Polish Forest Society
- The award of the Meritorious Teacher of the Polish People's Republic
- Knight's Cross of the Order of Polonia Restituta
- Officer's Cross of the Order of Polonia Restituta
- Righteous Among the Nations (2007)
- The Commander's Cross of the Order of Polonia Restituta (2008)
