= Bengt Uggla =

Swedish modern pentathlete

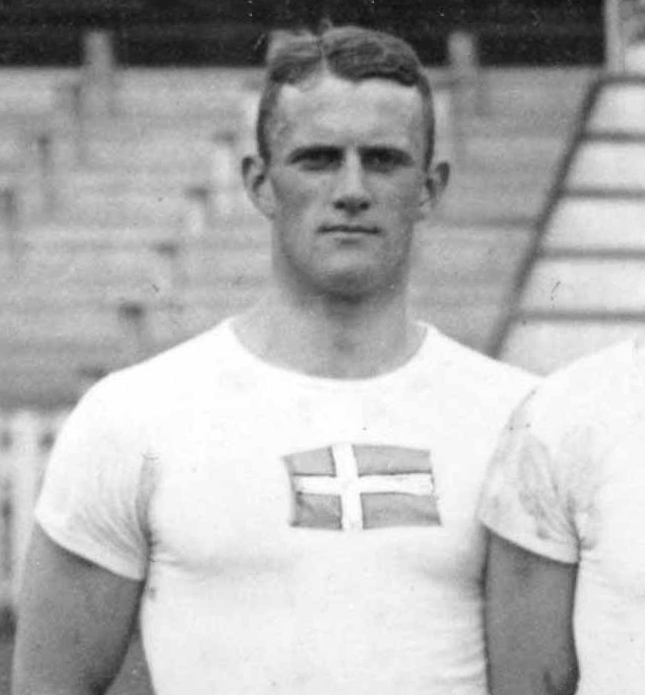
- Uggla at the 1920 Olympics

Personal information
- Born: 9 September 1894 Stockholm, Sweden
- Died: 26 February 1937 (aged 42) Stockholm, Sweden

Sport
- Sport: Modern pentathlon
- Club: I1 IF, Stockholm

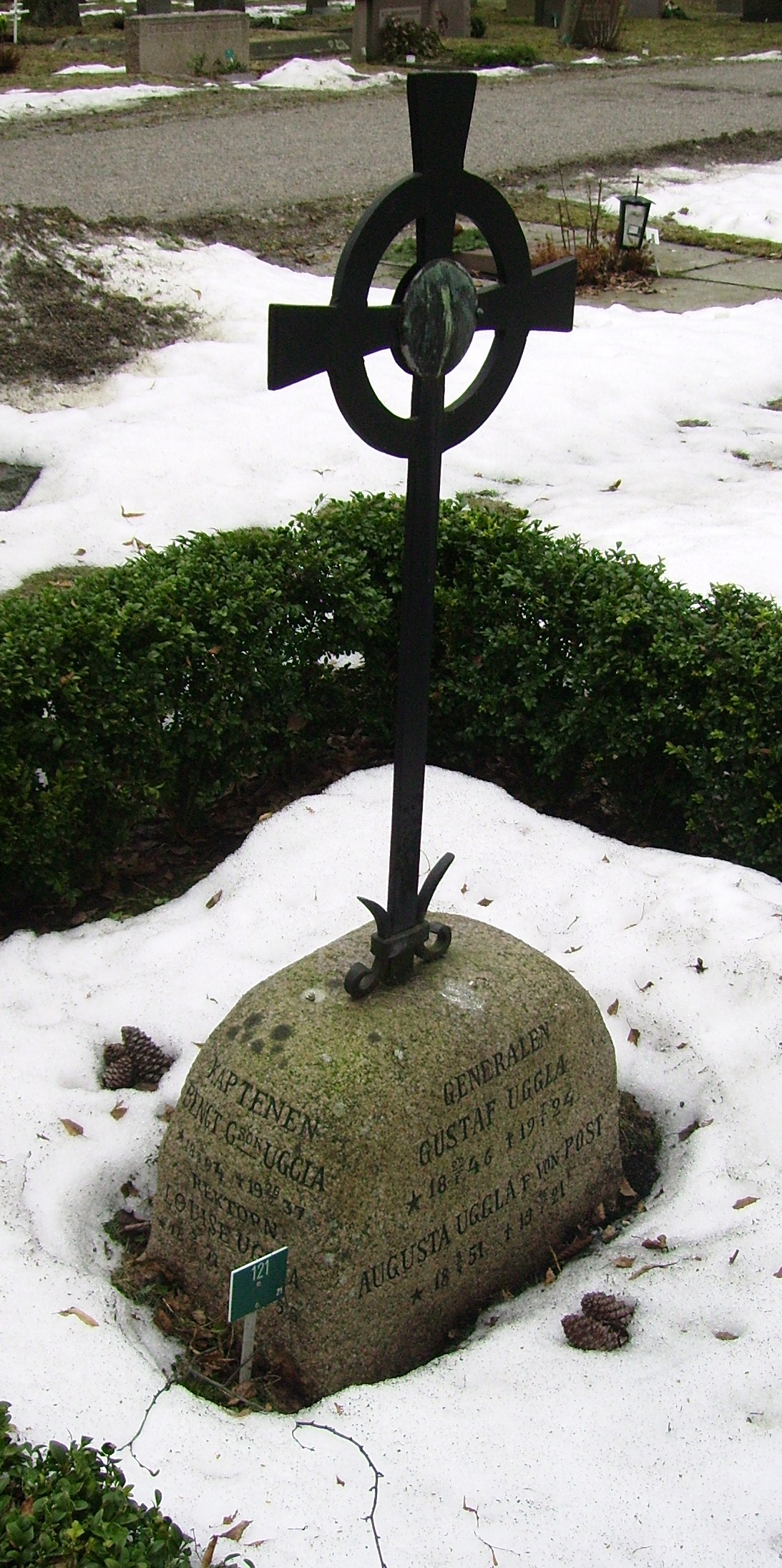
Uggla family grave in Solna, Stockholm

Bengt Uggla (9 September 1894 – 26 February 1937) was a Swedish modern pentathlete. He participated in the 1920 Summer Olympics and finished fourth. His elder brother Bertil competed in various sports, including modern pentathlon at the 1924 Olympics.

Uggla was the youngest son of General Gustaf Uggla. Uggla passed studentexamen in Linköping in 1912 and was commissioned as an officer two years later. He became a captain in Svea Life Guards. Uggla died on 26 February 1937. The cause of death was influenza with associated blood clot.
