= List of ship decommissionings in 1976 =

The list of ship decommissionings in 1976 includes a chronological list of all ships decommissioned in 1976.

	Operator	Ship	Flag	Class and type	Fate	Other notes
31 January	United States Navy	Hancock		Essex-class aircraft carrier	Scrapped	
30 April	German Navy	Greif		Seeadler-class fast attack craft	Sold to Greece	Renamed Kyklos
7 May	Finnlines	Bore Star	Finland	Ferry (used as a cruise ship)	End of charter; returned to Steamship Company Bore	Placed in Silja Line traffic
27 June	German Navy	Geier		Seeadler-class fast attack craft	Sold to Greece	Renamed Tyfon
25 July	German Navy	Kondor		Seeadler-class fast attack craft	Sold to Greece	Renamed Lailaps
30 July	German Navy	Seeadler		Seeadler-class fast attack craft	Sold to Greece	Renamed Esperos
24 August	German Navy	Habicht		Seeadler-class fast attack craft	Sold to Greece	Renamed Kataurus
1 September	Steamship Company Bore	Bore	Finland	Ferry	Laid up; sold to Jakob Lines in 1977	Renamed Borea
10 November	Steamship Company Bore	Bore Star	Finland	Ferry	Chartered to Finnlines	
18 November	Royal Netherlands Navy	De Zeven Provinciën		De Zeven Provinciën-class cruiser	Transferred to Peru	Renamed BAP Aguirre
26 November	German Navy	Kormoran		Seeadler-class fast attack craft	Sold to Greece	Renamed Scorpius
27 December	German Navy	Sperber		Seeadler-class fast attack craft	Sold to Greece	Cannibalized
Date uncertain	Royal Navy	Hampshire		County-class destroyer	Scrapped	
Date uncertain	Polish Navy	Gryf		Training and hospital ship	Relegated to an accommodation ship.	

== Bibliography ==
- Friedman, Norman (2022) [1983]. U. S. Aircraft Carriers: An Illustrated Design History (Revised ed.). Annapolis, Maryland: Naval Institute Press. ISBN 978-1-68247-762-5.
