= BAP Almirante Grau (CLM-81) =

De Zeven Provinciën-class cruiser

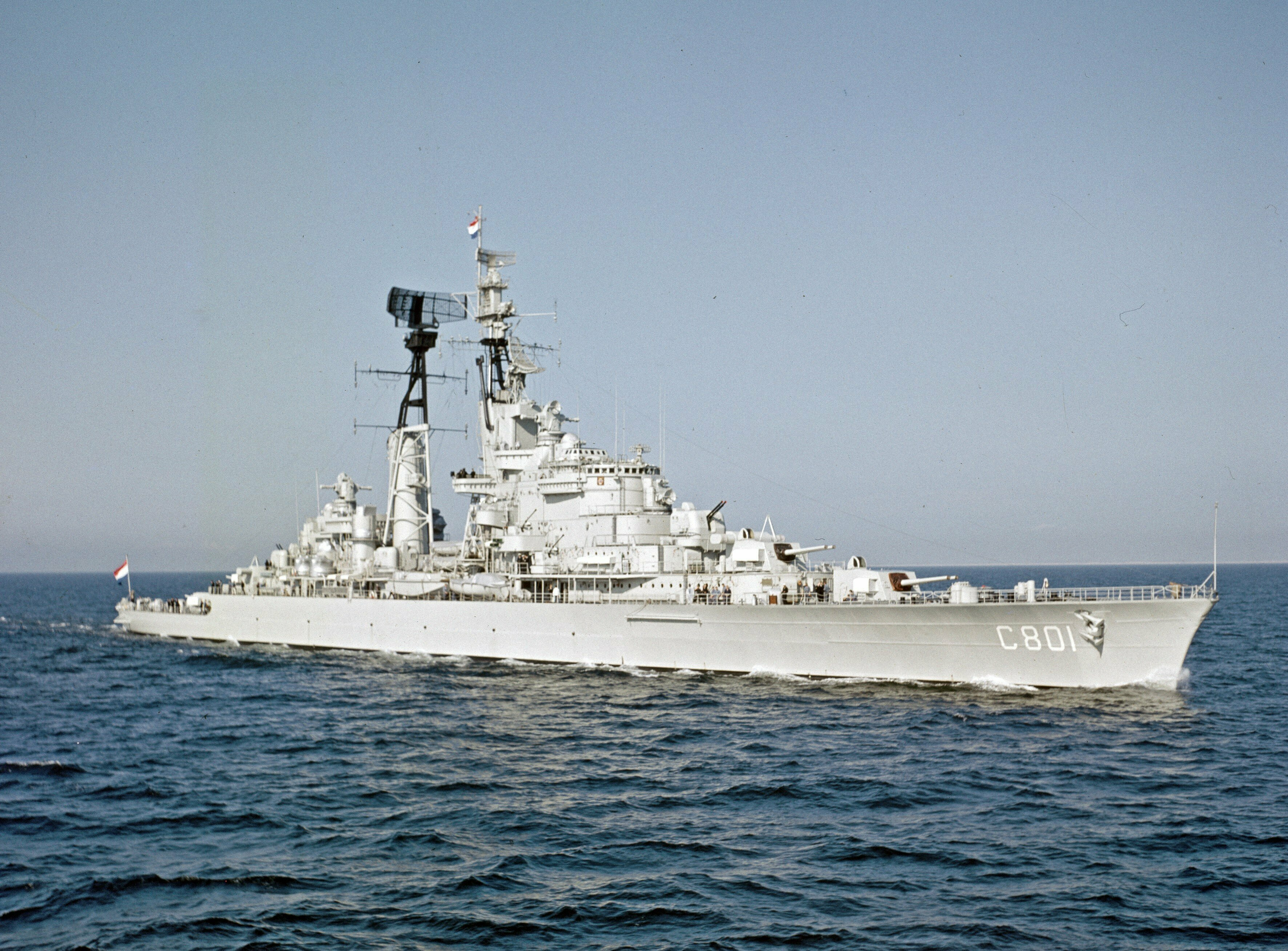
- The modernised De Ruyter

History

Netherlands
- Name: De Ruyter
- Namesake: Michiel de Ruyter
- Builder: Wilton-Fijenoord, Schiedam
- Laid down: 5 September 1939
- Launched: 24 December 1944
- Commissioned: 18 November 1953
- Decommissioned: 16 October 1972
- Fate: Sold to Peruvian Navy in March 1973

Peru
- Name: Almirante Grau
- Namesake: Admiral Miguel Grau Seminario
- Acquired: 7 March 1973
- Commissioned: 23 May 1973
- Decommissioned: 26 September 2017
- Home port: Callao
- Motto: Poder y Gloria (Power and Glory)
- Fate: Sold for scrapping, July 2022

General characteristics
- Class & type: De Zeven Provinciën-class cruiser
- Displacement: 9,681 tons standard; 12,165 tons full load
- Length: 187.32 m (614.6 ft)
- Beam: 17.25 m (56.6 ft)
- Draught: 6.72 m (22.0 ft)
- Propulsion: 4 Werkspoor-Yarrow three-drum boilers; 2 De Schelde Parsons geared steam turbines; 2 shafts; 85,000 shp (63,000 kW)
- Speed: 32 kn (59 km/h; 37 mph)
- Range: 6,900 nmi (12,800 km; 7,900 mi) at 12 kn (22 km/h; 14 mph)
- Complement: 47 officers, 606 enlisted
- Sensors & processing systems: Signaal SEWACO Foresee PE CMS; Signaal LW-08 early warning; Signaal DA-08 surface search; Signaal STIR-240 fire control; Signaal WM-25 fire control; Signaal LIROD-8 optronic; Decca 1226 navigation
- Electronic warfare & decoys: Signaal Rapids ESM system; CME Scimitar ECM system; 2 Matra Défense Dagaie decoy launchers; 1 Matra Défense Sagaie decoy launcher
- Armament: 8 Otomat Mk 2 SSM; 4 × 2 Bofors 152/53 guns; 2 × 2 OTO Melara 40/L70 DARDO guns; 4 × 1 Bofors 40 mm Automatic Gun L/70
- Armor: 50-76 mm belt; 50-125 mm turrets; 50-125 mm conning tower

BAP Almirante Grau (CLM-81) was a De Zeven Provinciën-class light cruiser that served in the Dutch and Peruvian navies. Completed for the Dutch in 1953 as HNLMS De Ruyter (C801), she was acquired by Peru in 1973 and served as fleet flagship.

Almirante Grau underwent a major modernization program between 1985 and 1988 during which she was fitted with new weapons and electronics. She was the last gun cruiser in service in any navy before being decommissioned on 26 September 2017.

In 2019, it was to be said that she would be preserved as a museum ship. However, it was later announced on 14 February 2022 that the ship would put up for sale. By July 2022 the ship was moved out of its harbor in Peru to be scrapped.

== Construction ==
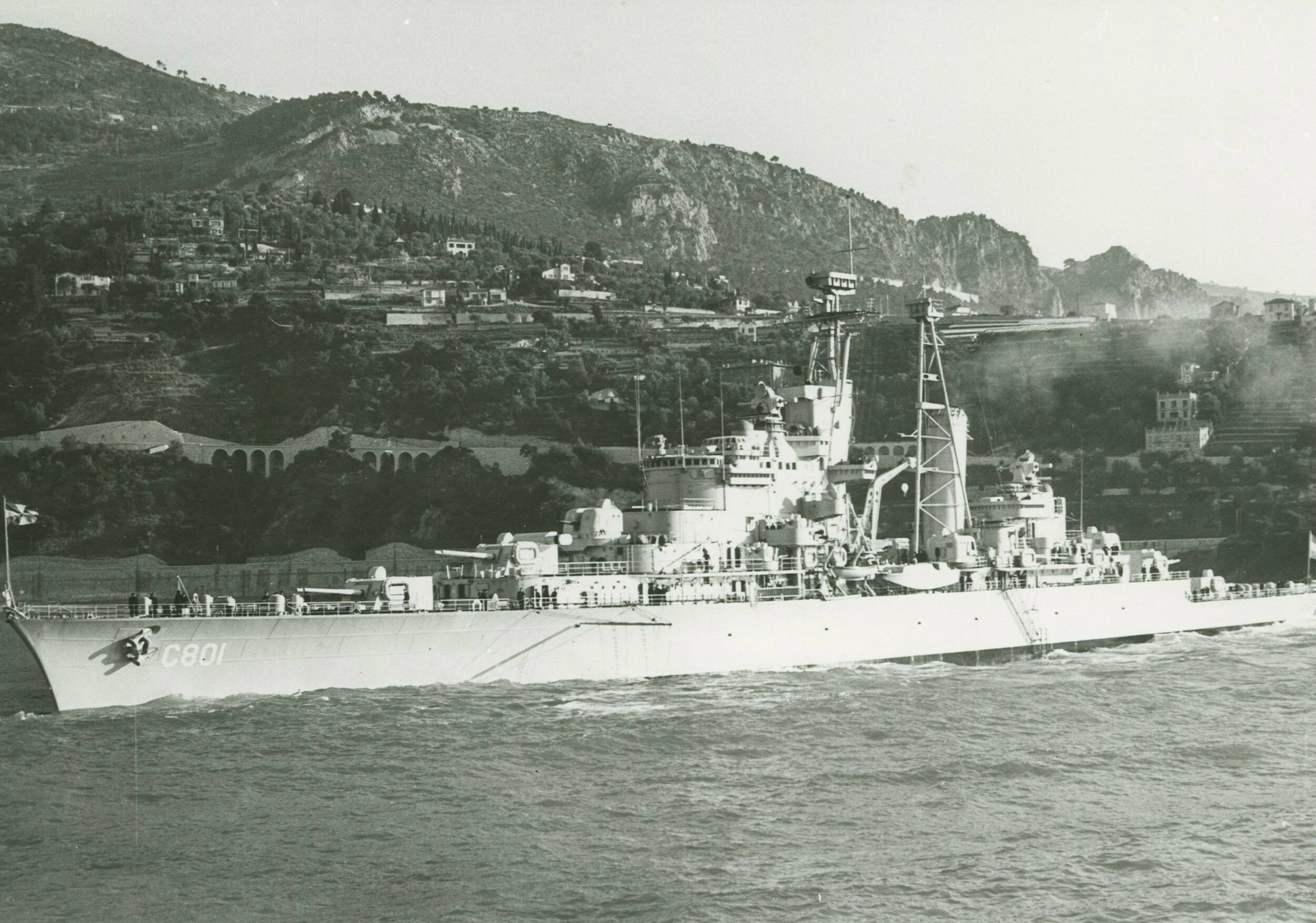
HNLMS De Ruyter in her original post-war configuration.

De Ruyter was laid down by the Royal Netherlands Navy on 5 September 1939 as the cruiser HNLMS De Zeven Provinciën at the Wilton-Fijenoord shipyard at Schiedam. She and her sister-ship, later De Zeven Provinciën, were intended to replace the two Java-class cruisers in the Dutch East Indies. She was named after Dutch naval hero Michiel de Ruyter.

At the German invasion of the Netherlands in May 1940 little had been constructed. The Kriegsmarine intended to complete her as the training cruiser KH 1 but construction was slow and she was not launched until 24 December 1944, with the intent by then to use her as a blockship in the Nieuwe Waterweg, the approaches to Rotterdam.

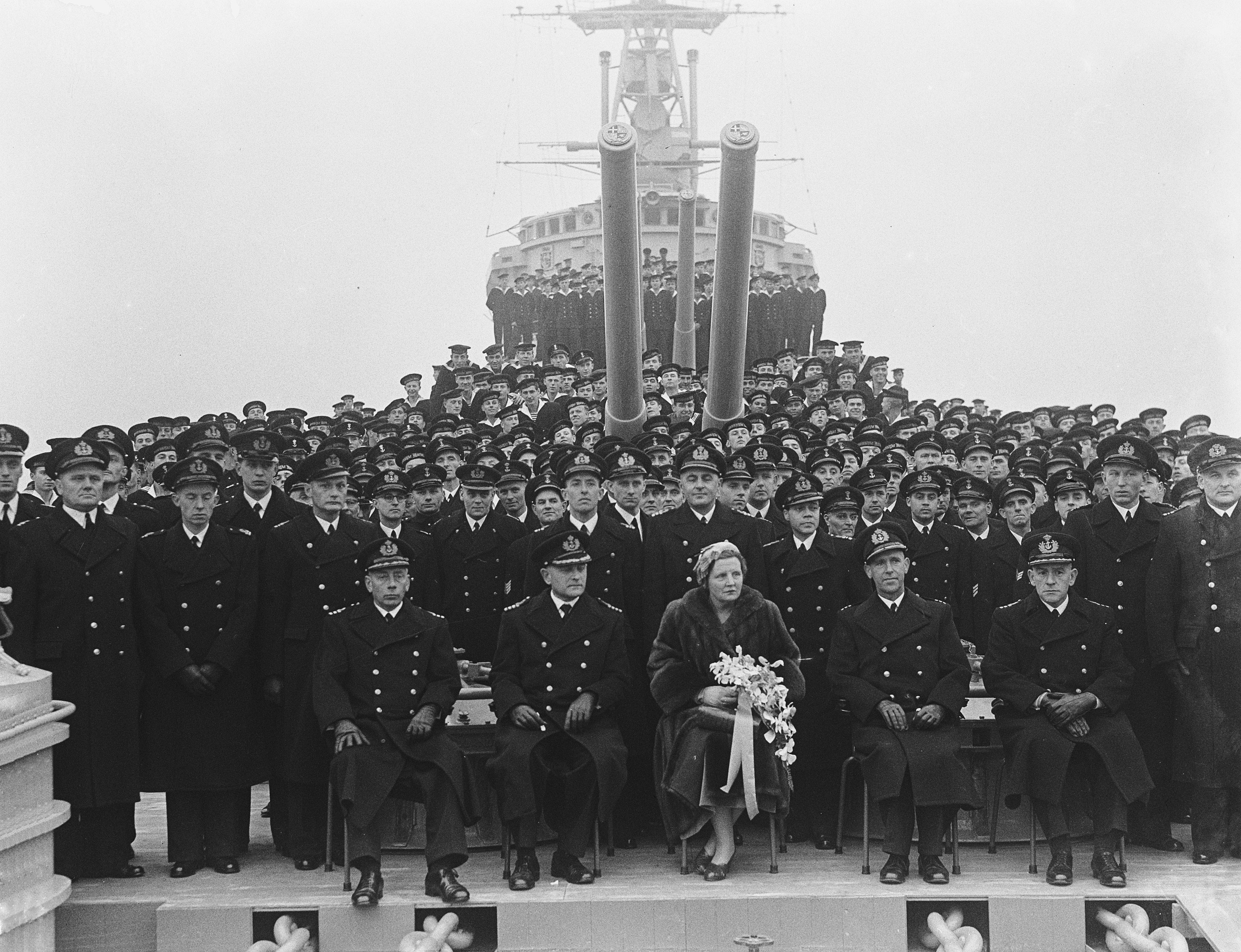
Her Majesty Queen Juliana of the Netherlands and Captain W. J. Kruys with Officers and crew at the commissioning of HNLMS De Ruyter in 1953.

After the liberation of the Netherlands, the Navy completed De Zeven Provinciën with modifications.

She was commissioned as HNLMS De Ruyter (C801) on 18 November 1953, in the presence of Her Majesty Queen Juliana of the Netherlands. The first captain of the new cruiser was W. J. Kruys.

== Royal Netherlands Navy service ==
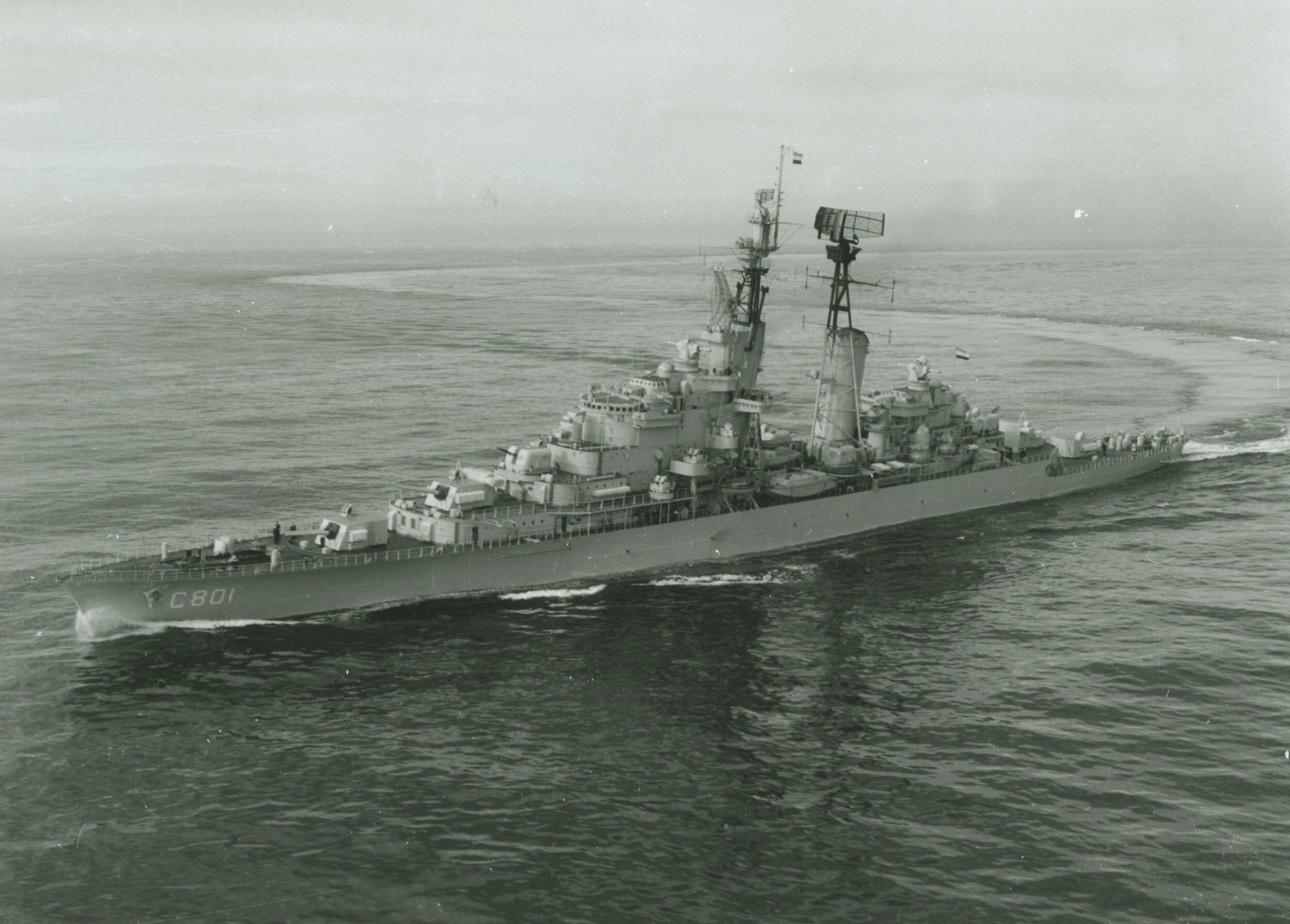
De Ruyter seen here in September 1971, just before she was decommissioned.

In Dutch service both ships participated in several NATO exercises, and were frequently used as flagships for different naval task forces.

Between 1962 and 1964, De Zeven Provinciën underwent a refit which included the removal of the two aft turrets and the installation of a RIM-2 Terrier SAM system, but lack of funds precluded the same modifications from being carried out in De Ruyter.

In 1968 it was reported that the completion of the Tromp-class frigates would mean that the De Ruyter would be taken out of service.

After two decades in service, she was decommissioned on 16 October 1972.

== Peruvian Navy service ==
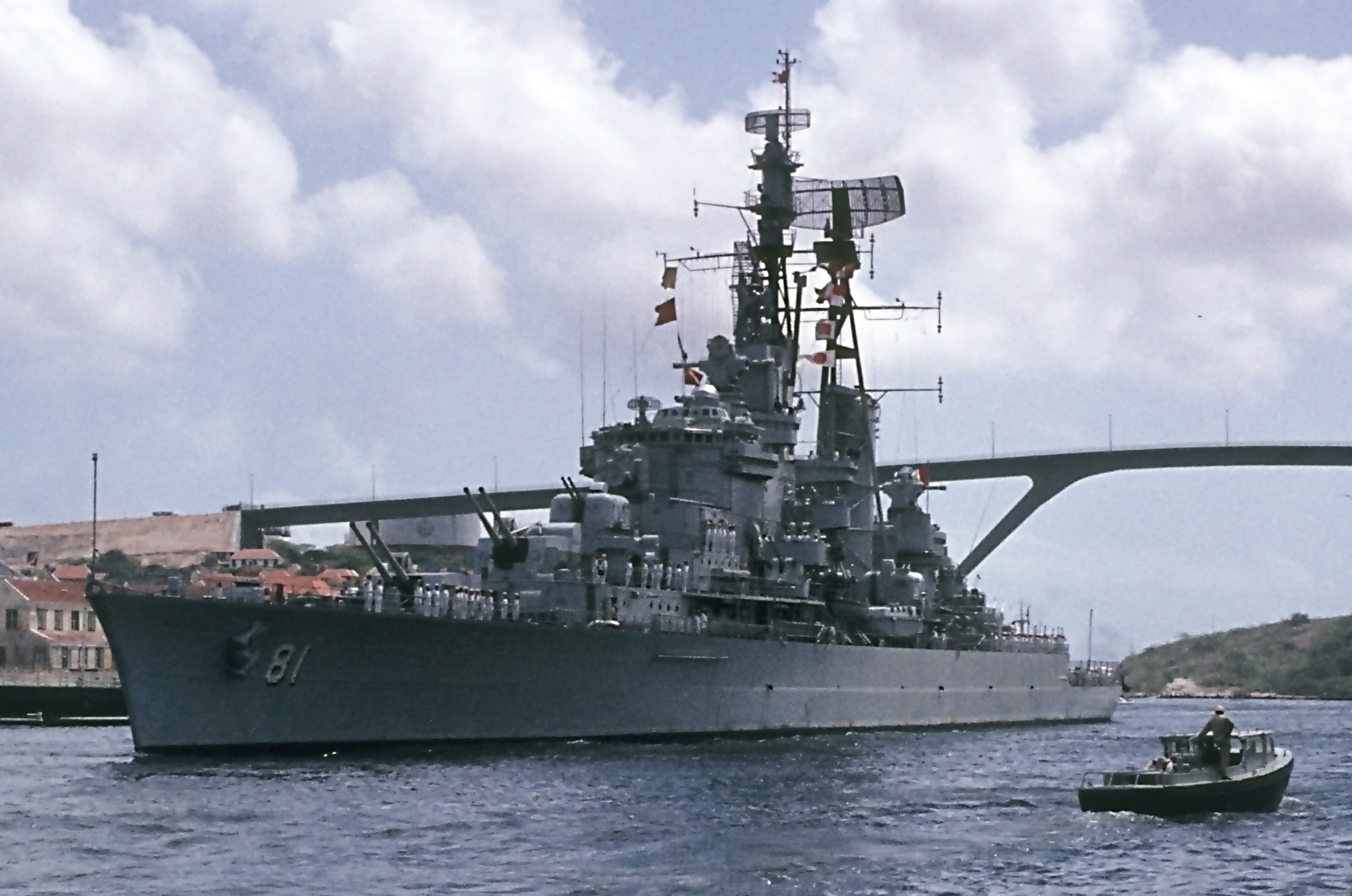
BAP Almirante Grau (CLM-81) leaves the harbor of Curaçao, June 1973.

The Peruvian Navy bought De Ruyter on 7 March 1973 as a counter to the acquisition of the Swedish cruiser Göta Lejon by the Chilean Navy. Commissioned on 23 May 1973 as Almirante Grau, in honor of the Peruvian Admiral Miguel Grau, the ship arrived at her new homeport of Callao on 11 July 1973.

She was designated fleet flagship in succession to another cruiser of the same name (the former HMS Newfoundland), which was renamed Capitán Quiñones.

=== Modernization ===
From 1985 until 1988, she underwent a major modernization program by Amsterdam Naval Services (ANS) at its shipyard in Amsterdam, during which she was denominated Proyecto de Modernización 01 (Modernization Project 01) or PM-01.

Her role as flagship was assumed by her sistership Aguirre as Almirante Grau. Both ships regained their former names when the former De Ruyter returned to Callao on 15 February 1988.

The upgrade program carried out in the Netherlands included the following:

- Fitting of the Signaal SEWACO Foresee PE combat management system
- Fitting of a Signaal DA-08 surface-search radar
- Fitting of a Signaal LW-08 air-search radar
- Fitting of a Decca 1226 navigation radar
- Fitting of a Signaal STIR-24 fire-control radar
- Fitting of a Signaal WM-25 fire-control radar
- Fitting of two Signaal LIROD-8 optronic directors
- Fitting of the Signaal Rapids ESM system
- Fitting of the CME Scimitar ECM system
- Fitting of two Matra Défense Dagaie decoy launchers
- Fitting of one Matra Défense Sagaie decoy launcher
- Fitting of a Link Y data link
- Fitting (towers) of two Bofors signal amplifiers, including aiming and firing limitation
- Removal of four twin Bofors 57/60 mm gun mountings
- Removal of the CWE-610 hull sonar

Further work was carried out by SIMA dockyards in Callao as follows:

- Eight Otomat Mk 2 SSMs were fitted in 1993
- Two OTO Melara Twin 40L70 DARDO compact gun mountings were fitted in 1996, replacing four single Bofors 40/70 mm gun mountings

The LW-08 radar was later replaced by an AN/SPS-6, the former being installed in the frigate BAP Carvajal (FM-51) in 2003.

== Decommissioning ==
Almirante Grau was decommissioned on 26 September 2017. She was the last gun cruiser in service in any navy, although its main armament was supplemented with Otomat anti-ship missiles. She was replaced by the BAP Montero, now known as BAP Almirante Grau.

On 9 August 2019, the Peruvian Navy announced that she would be preserved as a museum ship in Lima, though in February 2022, the ship was placed on sale. In July 2022 it was reported that she was to be scrapped.

== Gallery ==
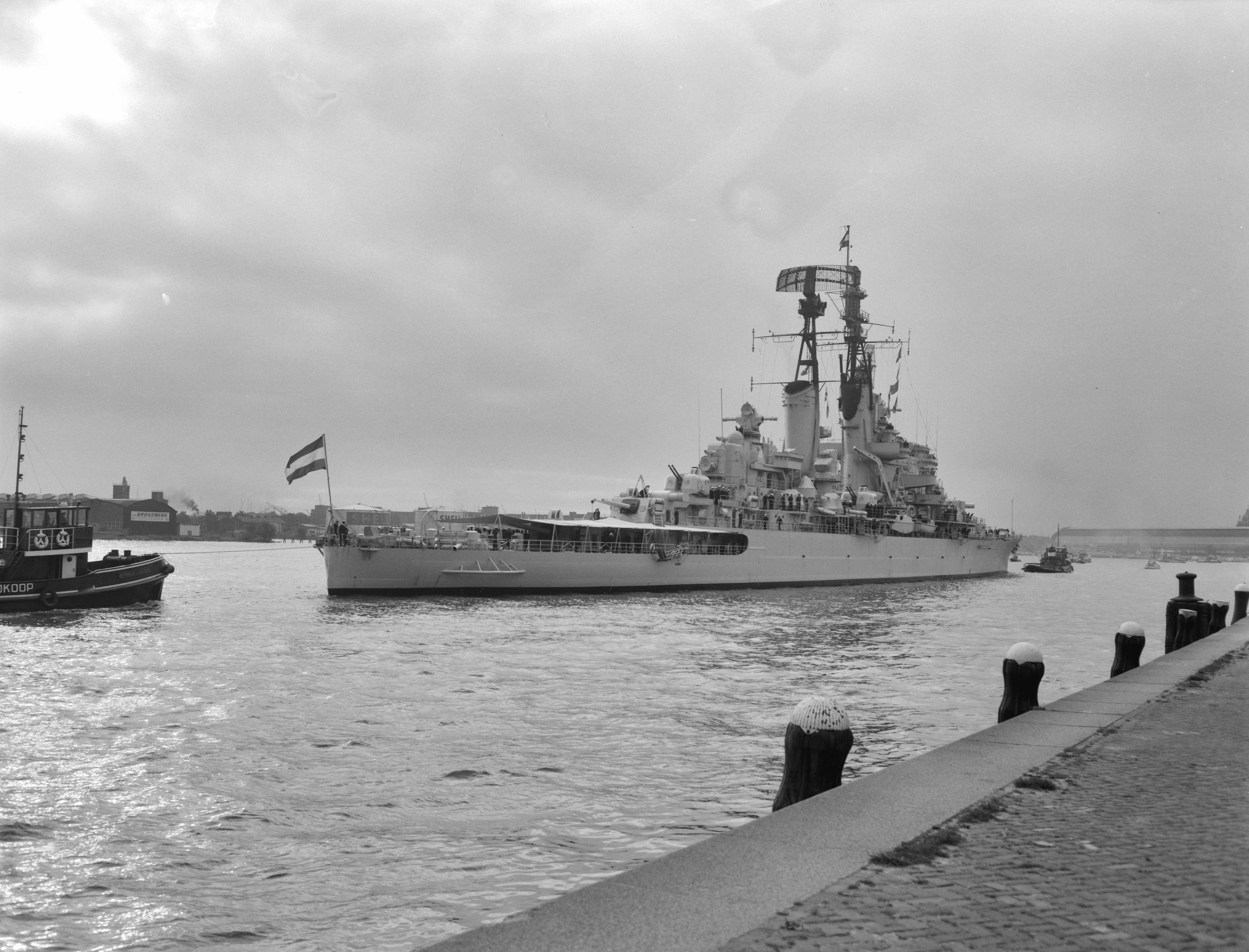
HNLMS De Ruyter 1962

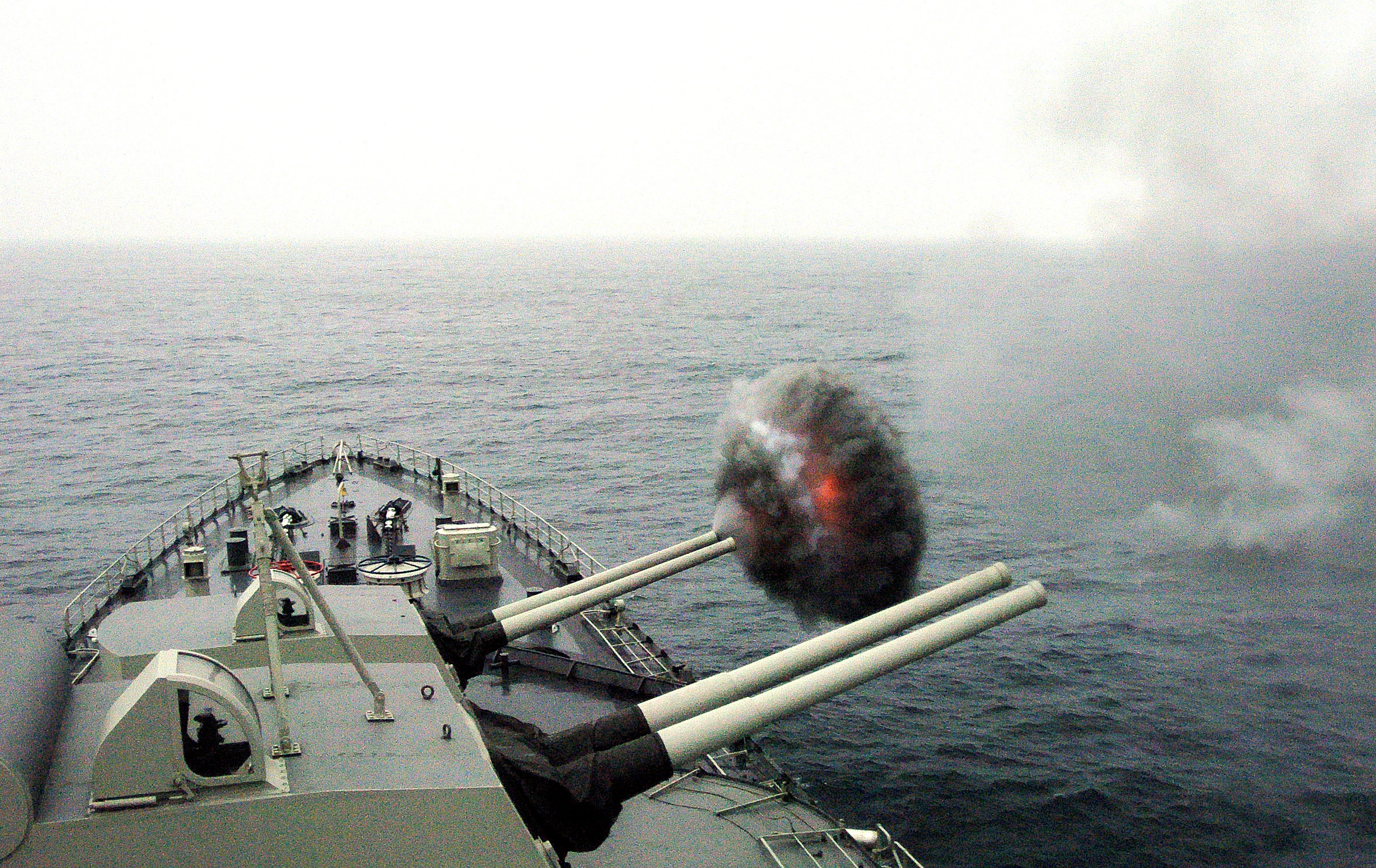
Almirante Grau firing her guns

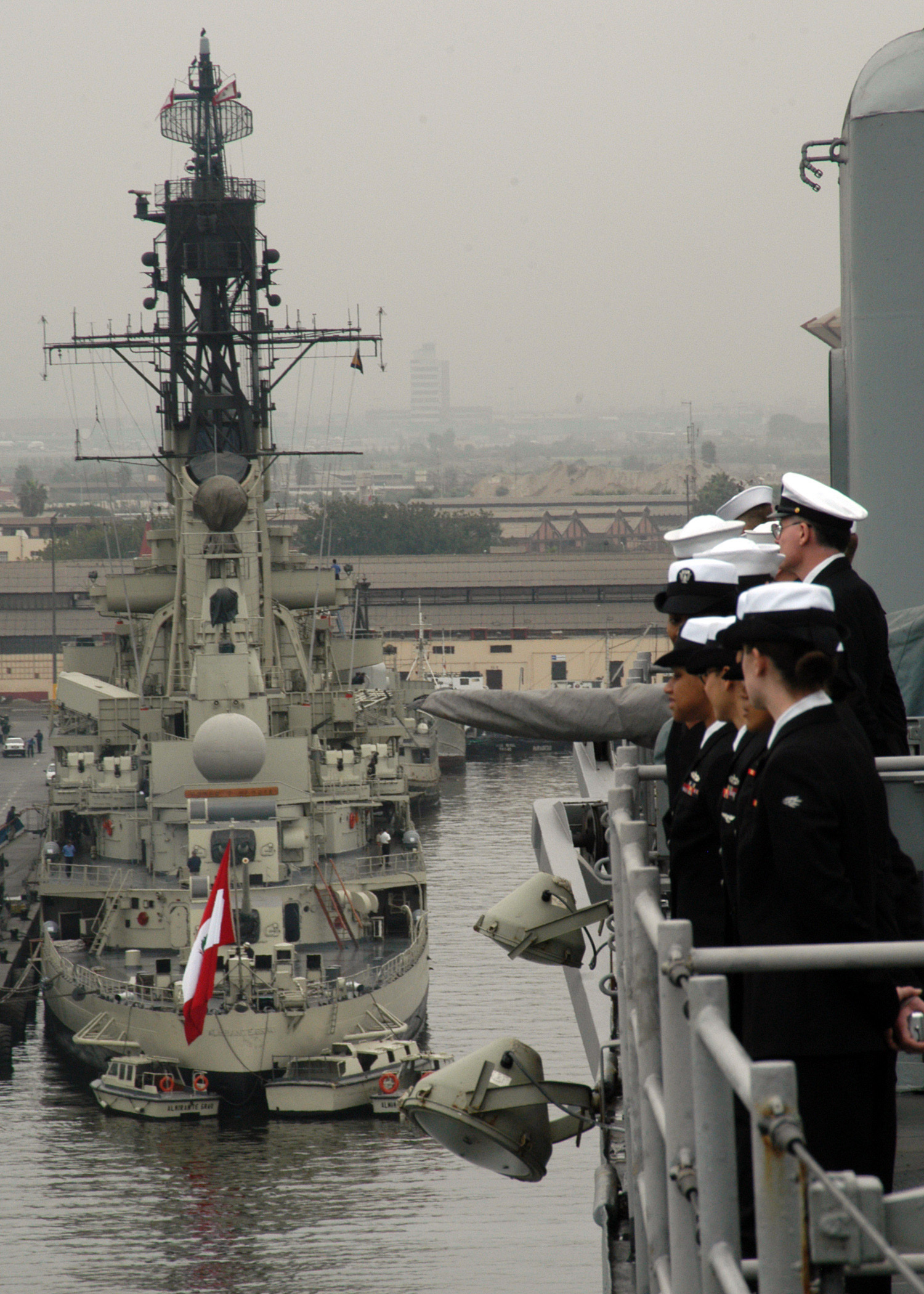
A stern view of BAP Almirante Grau from USS Pearl Harbor

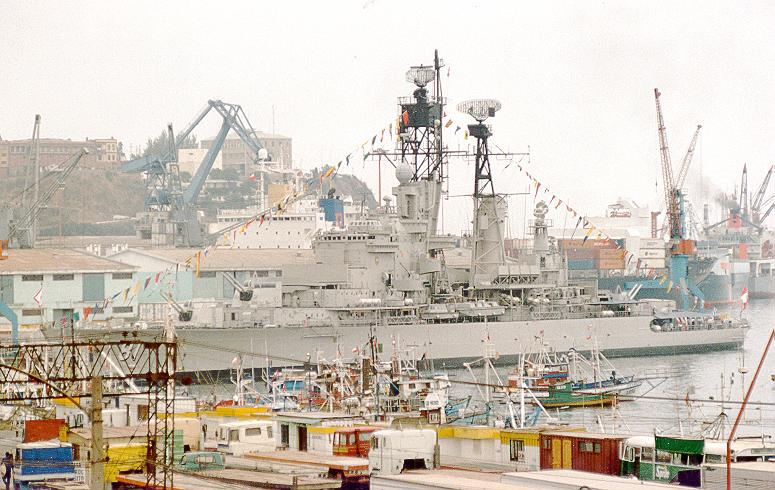
BAP Almirante Grau 1993

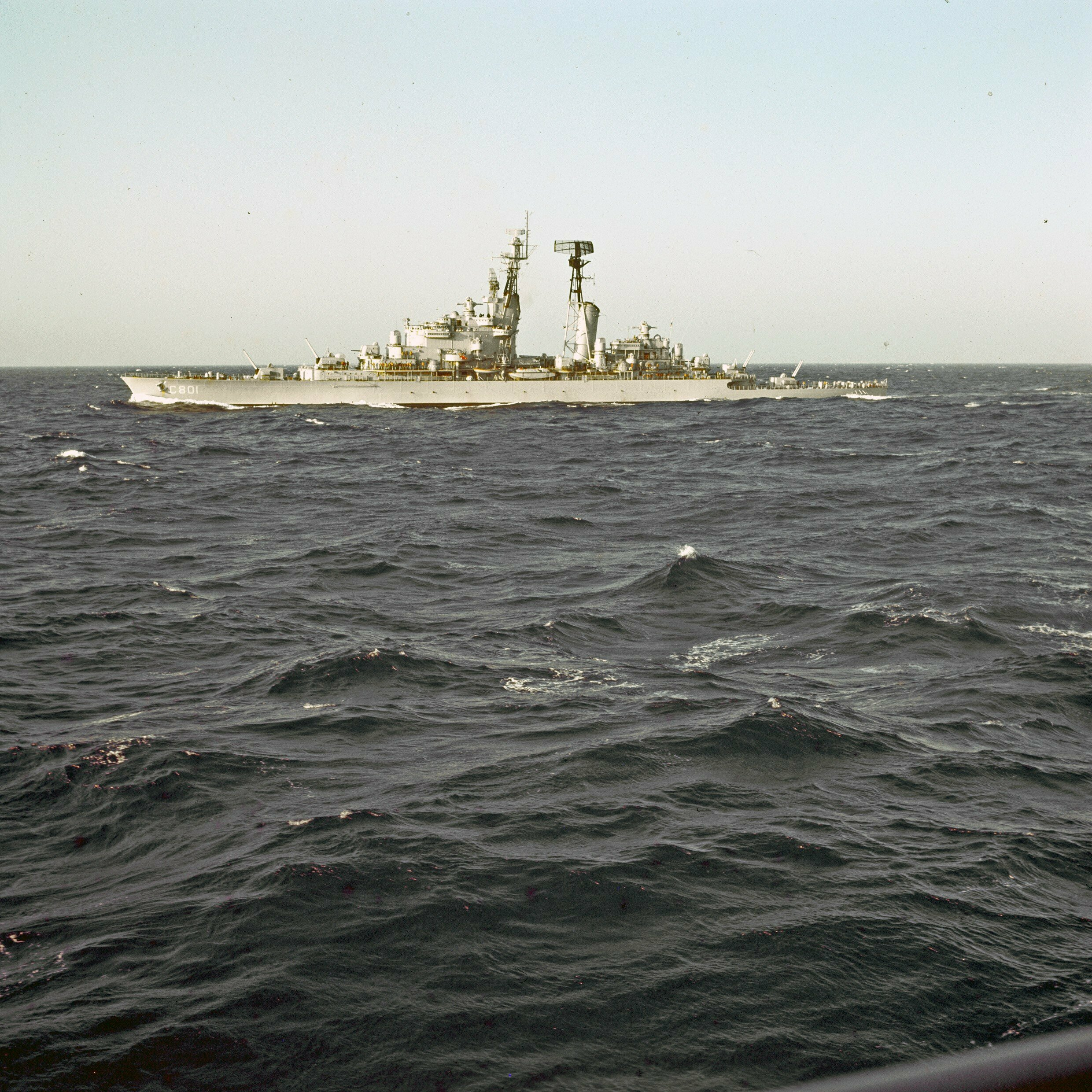
De Ruyter at sea with guns elevated.

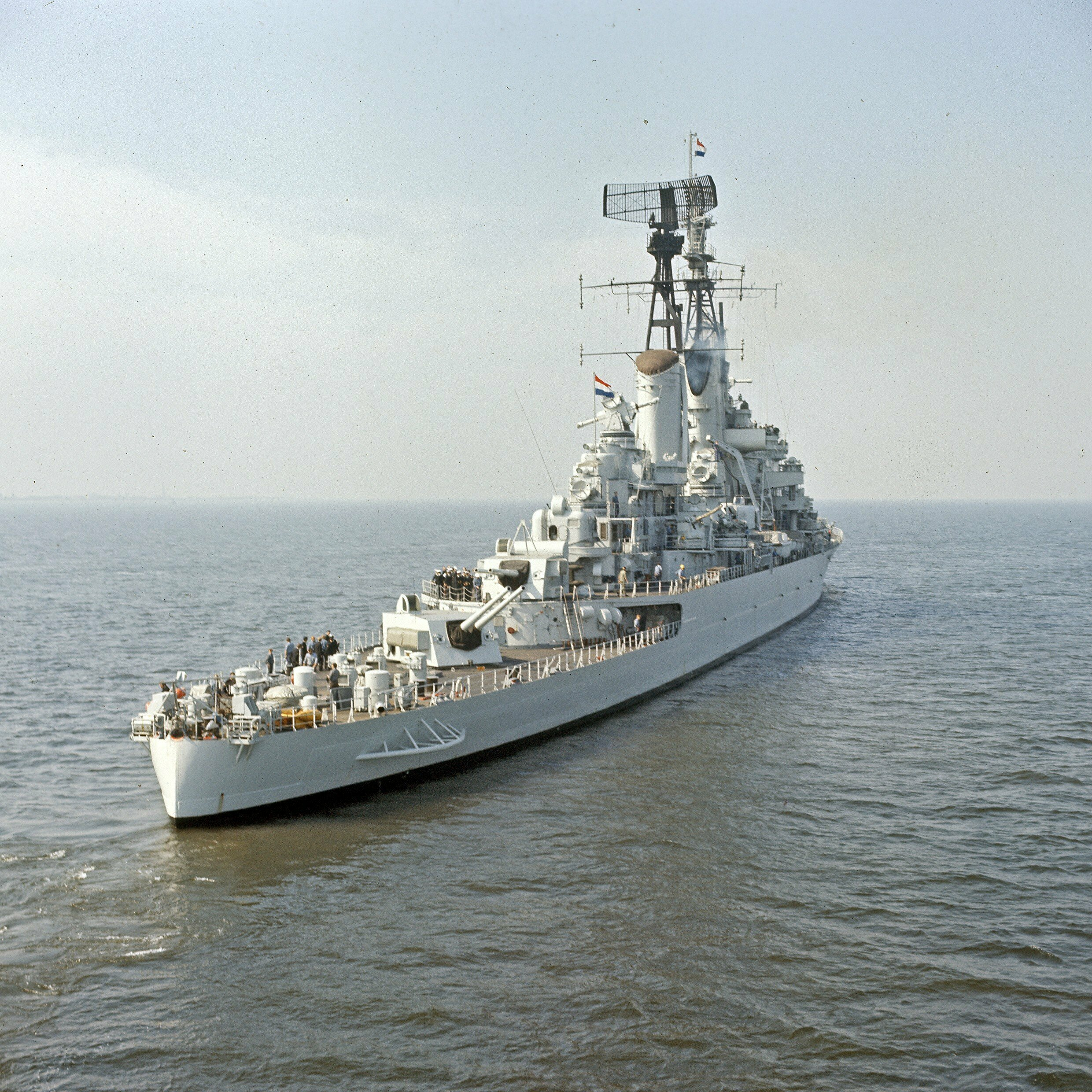
De Ruyter; view from the stern.

== Sources ==
- Baker III, Arthur D., The Naval Institute Guide to Combat Fleets of the World 2002-2003. Naval Institute Press, 2002.
- Rodríguez Asti, John, Cruceros. Buques de la Marina de Guerra del Perú desde 1884. Dirección de Intereses Marítimos, 2000. (in Spanish)
- van Dijk, A. (1988). "Re: The Dutch Shipbuilding Program of 1939". Warship International. XXV (3): 225. ISSN 0043-0374.
- van Dijk, Anthonie (1989). "Re: The Dutch Shipbuilding Program of 1939". Warship International. XXVI (2): 107. ISSN 0043-0374.
- Jane's Fighting Ships 2011-2012.
- Unexpected end: old cruiser De Ruyter on its way to scrap from MarineSchepen
