= Tre Kronor-class cruiser =

Swedish light cruisers (1947–1984)

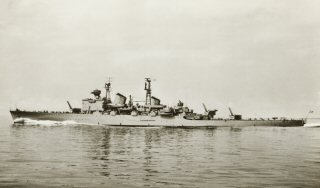
- HSwMS Tre Kronor

Class overview
- Name: Tre Kronor class
- Operators: Swedish Navy; Chilean Navy
- Built: 1943–1947
- In commission: 1947–1984
- Planned: 2
- Completed: 2
- Retired: 2

General characteristics
- Type: Cruiser
- Displacement: 7,400 long tons (7,519 t) standard; 9,200 long tons (9,348 t) full load
- Length: 174 m (570 ft 10 in) (pp); 182 m (597 ft 1 in) (oa)
- Beam: 16.45 m (54 ft 0 in)
- Draft: 5.94 m (19 ft 6 in)
- Propulsion: 2 shaft geared turbines, 4× 4-drum boilers, 100,000 shp (75,000 kW)
- Speed: 33 knots (61 km/h; 38 mph)
- Range: 4,350 nautical miles (8,060 km; 5,010 mi) at 14 knots (26 km/h; 16 mph)
- Complement: 618
- Armament: As built: 7 × Bofors 152 mm guns; 20 × Bofors 40mm m/36 guns; 7 × Bofors 20 mm m/40 guns; 6 × torpedo tubes; Göta Lejon, post 1958: 7 × 152 mm (6 in) guns; 4 × 57 mm Bofors; 11 × 40 mm guns; 6 × torpedo tubes
- Armour: Belt: 70 mm (2.8 in); Deck: 30 mm (1.2 in)upper, 30 mm (1.2 in) main; Turrets: 50–127 mm (2.0–5.0 in); Conning tower: 20–25 mm (0.79–0.98 in)

The Tre Kronor class (English: Three Crowns class) was a class of two cruisers built for the Swedish Navy during World War II, comprising Tre Kronor and Göta Lejon. Tre Kronor was discarded in 1968 and Göta Lejon was sold to Chile in 1971. Renamed Almirante Latorre, she remained in service until being discarded in 1986.

== Design and development ==
The outbreak of World War II caused the Swedish Navy to change its naval strategy, with it being decided to base the fleet on two squadrons of destroyers, each of which would be led by a cruiser, instead of the existing organisation of slow coastal defence ships and small torpedo boats. In 1940, therefore, the Swedish government decided that two cruisers were to be built. The cruisers were designed by the Italian shipyard CRDA in 1940–1941.

The main armament was seven Bofors 152 mm guns, with one triple turret forward and two twin turrets aft. The guns were being built by Bofors for the Eendracht-class cruisers being built in the Netherlands for the Royal Netherlands Navy but were taken over by the Swedish government when the Netherlands surrendered to Germany in May 1940. They could fire a 46-kilogram (101 lb) shell to a range of 26,000 metres (28,000 yd) at a rate of 12–15 rounds per minute, and could elevate to 70 degrees, being capable of both anti-surface and anti-aircraft use. Additional anti-aircraft armament was provided by 20 Bofors 40 mm guns in 10 twin turrets and seven 20 mm m/40 guns. Six 533 mm (21 in) torpedo tubes were fitted, and the ship could also carry 160 mines.

A political debate broke out about the cruisers, with this, together with rework of the design, ensured that work did not start until 1943. The ships were built by the Götaverken and Eriksberg shipyards in Gothenburg. HSwMS Tre Kronor was launched on 16 December 1944, and HSwMS Göta Lejon on 17 November 1945.

== Service history ==
The delayed start to the ships and industrial action meant that World War II was long over when the ships were completed, with both ships entering service in 1947. They were refitted in the late 1940s and early 1950s, with a new bridge fitted, radar added and the 20 mm guns replaced by seven more 40 mm Bofors guns.

Göta Lejon had another major refit between 1957 and 1958, with new radar being fitted, and a revised secondary anti-aircraft armament of four Bofors 57 mm guns and eleven 40 mm Bofors guns. A similar upgrade for Tre Kronor was cancelled due to lack of funds.

Tre Kronor went into reserve in 1958, was stricken on 1 January 1964 and sold for scrap in 1968, being used to build a pontoon bridge. The more modern Göta Lejon was not stricken until 1 July 1970, and was sold to Chile in July 1971, being commissioned into the Chilean Navy as Almirante Latorre on 18 September 1971. Latorre was stricken from the Chilean Navy in 1984, and was sold in August 1986, being scrapped in Taiwan in 1987.

== Ships ==
	Builder	Laid Down	Launched	Commissioned	Fate
Tre Kronor	Götaverken	27 September 1943	16 December 1944	25 October 1947	Stricken, 1 January 1964; Sold for scrap, 1968
Göta Lejon	Eriksbergs Mekaniska Verkstad	27 September 1943	17 November 1945	15 December 1947	Stricken (Swedish Navy), 1 July 1970 Sold to Chile to serve as Almirante Latorre, 18 September 1971; Stricken (Chilean Navy), 1984
