= HNLMS De Zeven Provinciën =

Eight ships of the Royal Netherlands Navy have been named HNLMS De Zeven Provinciën or similar, after the original seven provinces of the Netherlands forming the Union of Utrecht and signing the Act of Abjuration (declaration of independence):

- Dutch ship De Zeven Provinciën (1643), ship of the line of the Amsterdam Admiralty;
- Dutch ship De Zeven Provinciën (1665), ship of the line (1665–1694), of the Maze Admiralty;
- Dutch ship De Zeven Provinciën (1694), ship of the line of the Maze Admiralty;
- Dutch ship De Zeven Provinciën (1782), ship of the line of the Noorderkwartier Admiralty;
- HNLMS De Zeven Provinciën (1909) – a coastal defence ship in service from 1910 to 1942;
- HNLMS De Zeven Provinciën (C802) (1950–1976), De Zeven Provinciën-class cruiser;
- HNLMS De Zeven Provinciën (F802) (2002– ), the lead ship of the De Zeven Provinciën-class frigates.

== See also ==
- Dutch ship Verenigde Provinciën (1665), ship of the line of the Amsterdam Admiralty;
