= HSwMS Göta Lejon =

Swedish cruiser

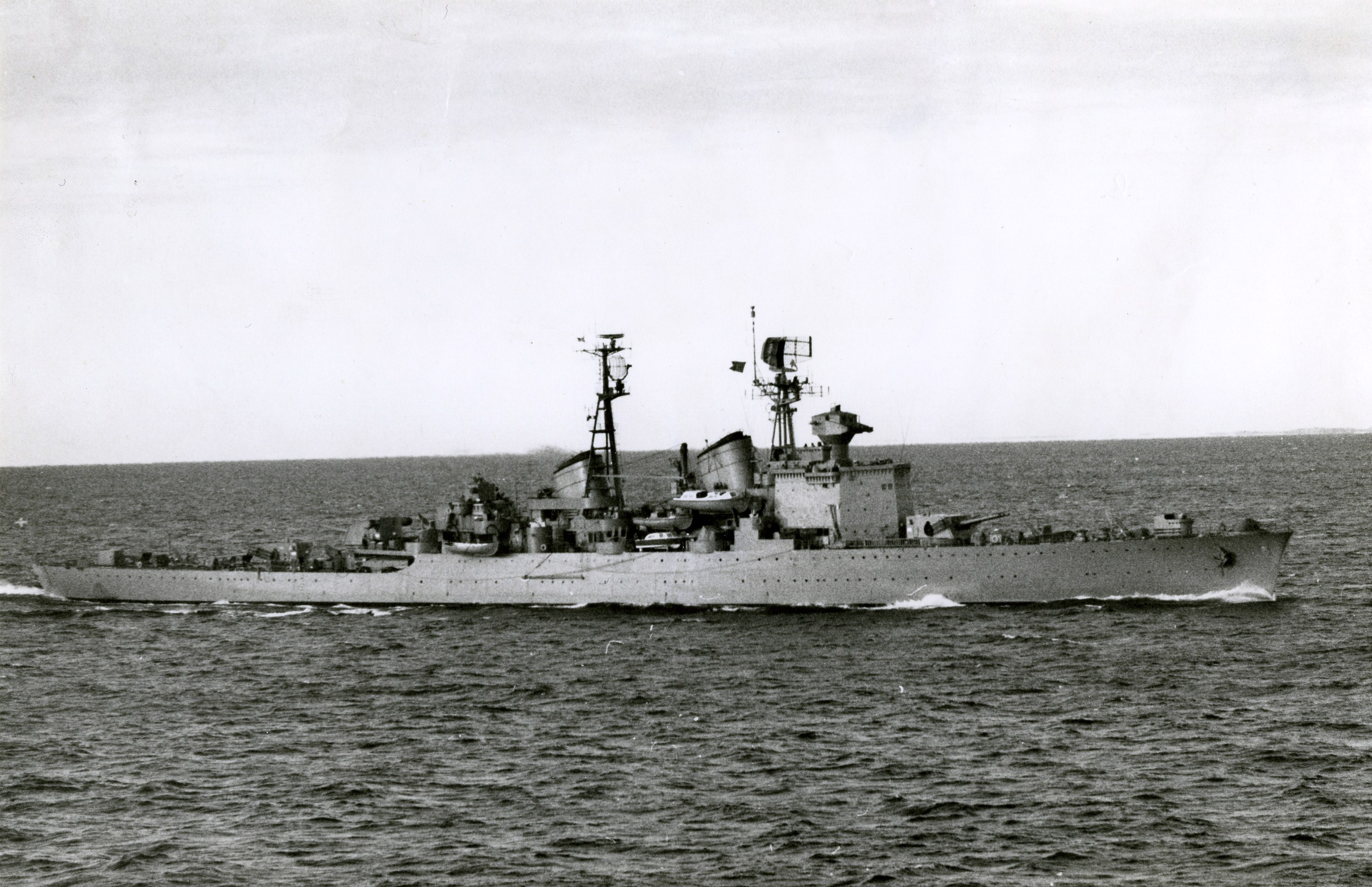
- Göta Lejon in 1958

History

Sweden
- Name: Göta Lejon
- Namesake: Göta Lion
- Builder: Eriksbergs Mekaniska Verkstads AB, Gothenburg
- Laid down: 27 September 1943
- Launched: 17 November 1945
- Commissioned: 15 December 1947
- Out of service: 1 July 1970
- Motto: Nemo me impune lacessit; ("No one provokes me with impunity")
- Fate: Sold to Chile, 1971
- Badge

Chile
- Name: Almirante Latorre
- Commissioned: 1971
- Decommissioned: 1984
- Identification: CL-04
- Fate: Scrapped, 1986

General characteristics
- Class & type: Tre Kronor-class cruiser
- Displacement: 8,200 long tons (8,332 t) standard; 9,200 long tons (9,348 t) full load
- Length: 182 m (597 ft 1 in)
- Beam: 16.7 m (54 ft 9 in)
- Draft: 5.7 m (18 ft 8 in)
- Propulsion: 2 shafts
- Speed: 33 knots (61 km/h; 38 mph)
- Complement: 445
- Armament: As built : 7 × Bofors 152 mm guns; 20 × Bofors 40 mm guns; 9 × 20 mm guns; 6 × torpedo tubes; From 1950 : 7 × 152 mm (6 in) guns; 21 × 40 mm guns; 6 × 20 mm guns; 6 × torpedo tubes
- Armour: Belt: 70 mm (2.8 in); Deck: 30 + 30 mm (1.2 + 1.2 in); Conning tower and turrets: 127 mm (5 in)

HSwMS Göta Lejon was a Swedish cruiser. Together with her sister ship Tre Kronor, they were the largest ships ever to serve in the Royal Swedish Navy. In 1971 Göta Lejon was sold to Chile where she was renamed Almirante Latorre and served in the Chilean Navy until 1984. She was sold to Taiwan in 1986 to be scrapped.

== Bibliography ==
- Westerlund, Karl-Eric (1980). "Sweden". In Chesneau, Roger (ed.). Conway's All the World's Fighting Ships 1922–1946. New York: Mayflower Books. pp. 368–377. ISBN 0-8317-0303-2.
- Westerlund, Karl-Eric & Chumbley, Stephen (1995). "Sweden". In Chumbley, Stephen (ed.). Conway's All The World's Fighting Ships 1947–1995. Annapolis, Maryland: Naval Institute Press. pp. 443–453. ISBN 1-55750-132-7.
- Whitley, M. J. (1995). Cruisers of World War Two: An International Encyclopedia. Annapolis, Maryland: Naval Institute Press. ISBN 1-55750-141-6.
