= Seven Provinces =

Seven Provinces may refer to

- Septem Provinciae, an ancient Roman province
- Dutch Republic, the Seven United Provinces of the Netherlands
- Seven Sealands, jurisdictional regions of medieval Frisia
- HNLMS De Zeven Provinciën, several Dutch ships
