= Harry Bong =

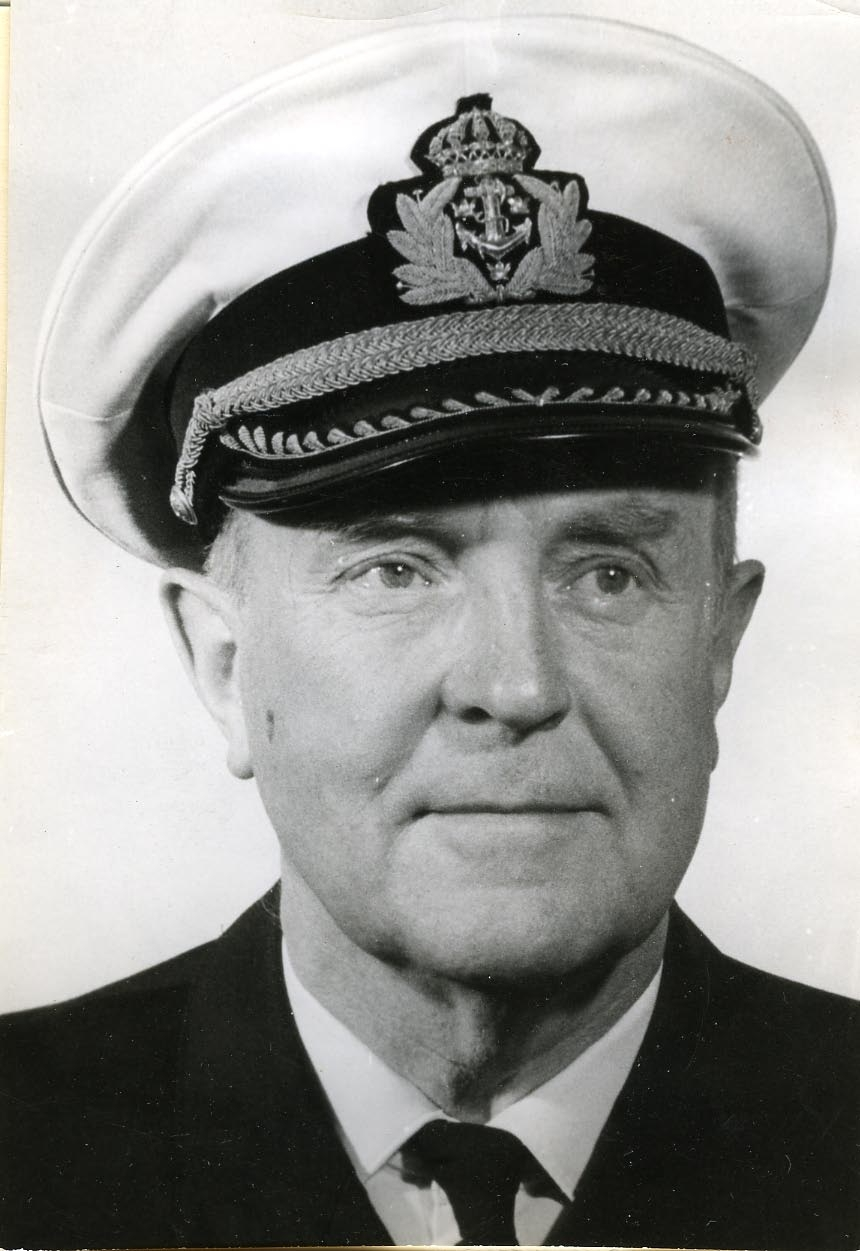
- Born: Nils Harry Martin Bong; 13 June 1905; Kristianstad, Sweden
- Died: 18 July 1987 (aged 82); Kivik, Sweden
- Military career
- Allegiance: Sweden
- Branch: Swedish Navy
- Service years: 1926–1965
- Rank: Captain
- Commands: HSwMS Antares; HSwMS Örnen; HSwMS Oscar II; Gothenburg Squadron; HSwMS Tre Kronor; Karlskrona Naval Training Schools

Captain Nils Harry Martin Bong (13 June 1905 – 18 July 1987) was a Swedish Navy officer. Bong served as commanding officers of the torpedo boat HSwMS Antares, the cruisers HSwMS Örnen and HSwMS Tre Kronor, and the coastal defence ship HSwMS Oscar II. He also served as commanding officer of the Gothenburg Squadron and of the Karlskrona Naval Training Schools.

== Early life ==
Bong was born on 13 June 1905 in Kristianstad, Sweden, the son of Martin Bong, a manufacturer, and his wife Anna (née Holmkvist). He passed studentexamen in 1923.

== Career ==
Bong was commissioned as a naval officer in the Swedish Navy in 1926 with the rank of acting sub-lieutenant. Bong served aboard the Sverige-class coastal defence ships, and he served aboard HSwMS Manligheten, HSwMS Dristigheten, HSwMS Äran and HSwMS Svea as an artillery officer. He graduated from the Royal Swedish Naval Staff College in 1933 and was promoted to Lieutenant (Kapten) in 1938. In 1938 he was appointed captain of the torpedo boat HSwMS Antares. Bong then served as a cadet officer from 1940 to 1942.

In 1943, Bong was appointed captain of the torpedo cruiser HSwMS Örnen. He was promoted to lieutenant commander in 1944 and served as captain of the coastal defence ship HSwMS Oscar II from 1944 to 1945. Bong was promoted to commander in 1949, and served as commanding officer of the Gothenburg Squadron from 1949 to 1950. He was then head of the Naval Staff's Education Department from 1951 to 1954 and was promoted to Captain in 1954. In 1954, he served as captain of the cruiser HSwMS Tre Kronor and as commanding officer of the 1st Squadron of the Coastal Fleet from 1954 to 1955. Bong then served as commanding officer of the Karlskrona Naval Training Schools (Karlskrona örlogsskolor, KÖS) from 1955 until his retirement in 1965.

Bong was chairman of the board of the Bongs fabriker AB from 1945 to 1965, chairman of the Karlskrona Orchestra Association (Karlskrona orkesterförening) from 1955 to 1965, the Naval Officers' Society in Karlskrona (Sjöofficerssällskapet i Karlskrona) from 1955 to 1965. He was also on the board of the Swedish Armed Forces School for Secondary Education from 1951 and of the Social Welfare Bureau of the Swedish Armed Forces (Försvarets socialbyrå) from 1951.

== Personal life ==
In 1936, he married Gunilla Holmström (1912–1988), the daughter of Lennart Holmström and Anna (née Ericsson). They had four children; Fredrik (born 1936), Christina (born 1939), Ingrid (born 1942), and Martin (born 1948).

Bong died on 18 July 1987 in his home in Kivik.

== Dates of rank ==
- 1926 – Acting sub-lieutenant
- 1929 – Sub-lieutenant
- 1938 – Lieutenant
- 1944 – Lieutenant commander
- 1949 – Commander
- 1954 – Captain

== Awards and decorations ==
Bong's awards:

- (Sweden) Commander 1st Class of the Order of the Sword (6 June 1964)
- (Sweden) Swedish Women's Voluntary Defence Organization Royal Medal of Merit in gold
- (Sweden) Swedish Naval Volunteers' Gold Medal (Sjövärnskårens guldmedalj)
- (Sweden) Swedish Federation of Orchestral Associations' Gold Medal (Sveriges orkesterföreningars riksförbunds guldmedalj)
- (Sweden) Blekinge Gymnastics Association's Gold Medal (Blekinge gymnastikförbunds guldmedalj)
- (Sweden) Swedish Military Sports Association's Medal of Merit in Gold (Sveriges militära idrottsförbunds förtjänstmedalj i guld)

== Honours ==
- Member of the Royal Swedish Society of Naval Sciences (1951)
