= HSwMS Tre Kronor =

Cruiser of the Royal Swedish Navy

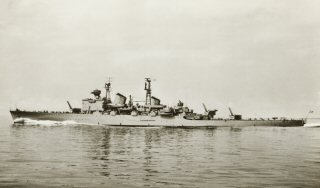
- HSwMS Tre Kronor

History

Sweden
- Name: Tre Kronor
- Namesake: Tre Kronor
- Builder: Götaverken, Gothenburg
- Laid down: 27 September 1943
- Launched: 16 December 1944
- Commissioned: 25 October 1947
- Out of service: 1 January 1964
- Motto: För Sveriges frihet; ("For the freedom of Sweden")
- Fate: Stricken, 1 January 1964 and scrapped, 1968
- Badge

General characteristics
- Class & type: Tre Kronor-class cruiser
- Displacement: 7,400 long tons (7,519 t)
- Length: 181.96 m (597 ft 0 in)
- Beam: 16.45 m (54 ft 0 in)
- Draft: 5.9 m (19 ft 4 in)
- Propulsion: 2 shafts, 90000shp
- Speed: 33 knots (61 km/h; 38 mph)
- Complement: 618
- Armament: As built : 7 × Bofors 152 mm guns; 20 × Bofors 40 mm guns; 9 × 20 mm guns; 6 × torpedo tubes; From 1950 : 7 × 152 mm (6 in) guns; 21 × 40 mm guns; 6 × 20 mm guns; 6 × torpedo tubes
- Armor: 70 mm (2.8 in); Deck: 30 + 30 mm (1.2 + 1.2 in); Conning tower and turrets: 127 mm (5 in)

HSwMS Tre Kronor was a cruiser built for the Royal Swedish Navy during the Second World War.

== Description ==
The Tre Kronor-class ships had an overall length of 181.96 meters (597 ft 0 in), a beam of 16.45 metres (54 ft 0 in) and a draft of 5.94 metres (19 ft 6 in) at deep load. They displaced was 7,400 long tons (7,500 t) at normal load, which increased to 9,200 long tons (9,300 t) at deep load. Four steam boilers fed steam to two geared steam turbines that each drove a single propeller shaft. The engines were rated at 100,000 shaft horsepower (75,000 kW) which gave the ships a speed of 33 knots (61 km/h; 38 mph). They had a complement of 618 officers and men.

== History ==
At the start of the war most of the ships of the Royal Swedish Navy were quite old and the navy was in need of new ships. In 1940 the government decided that three cruisers were to be built. A political debate broke out about the cruisers and works did not start until 1943. The ship was to be built in Götaverken in Gothenburg. Eventually only two of the cruisers were built, and the third cruiser-squadron of the Coastal Fleet would be led by the modernised AA-cruiser HSwMS Gotland.

The turrets used on HSwMS Tre Kronor were built by Bofors and were originally ordered by the Dutch Navy to be fitted on the two De Zeven Provinciën-class cruisers, but after the German occupation of the Netherlands the Swedish government was afraid they would be claimed by the Germans so they were confiscated.

Tre Kronor was launched 16 December 1944, commissioned on 25 October 1947, and served until 1 January 1964.

== Captains ==
- 1947–1948: Erik af Klint
- 1949–1951: Erik Friberg
- 1954–1954: Harry Bong
- 1954–1955: Magnus Starck
- 1955–1956: Åke Lindemalm
- 1956–1957: Magnus Hammar
- 1957–1958: Anders Nilson

== Bibliography ==
- Westerlund, Karl-Eric (1980). "Sweden". In Chesneau, Roger (ed.). Conway's All the World's Fighting Ships 1922–1946. New York: Mayflower Books. pp. 368–377. ISBN 0-8317-0303-2.
- Westerlund, Karl-Eric & Chumbley, Stephen (1995). "Sweden". In Chumbley, Stephen (ed.). Conway's All The World's Fighting Ships 1947–1995. Annapolis, Maryland: Naval Institute Press. pp. 443–453. ISBN 1-55750-132-7.
- Whitley, M. J. (1995). Cruisers of World War Two: An International Encyclopedia. Annapolis, Maryland: Naval Institute Press. ISBN 1-55750-141-6.
