= BAP Aguirre (CH-84) =

De Zeven Provinciën-class cruiser

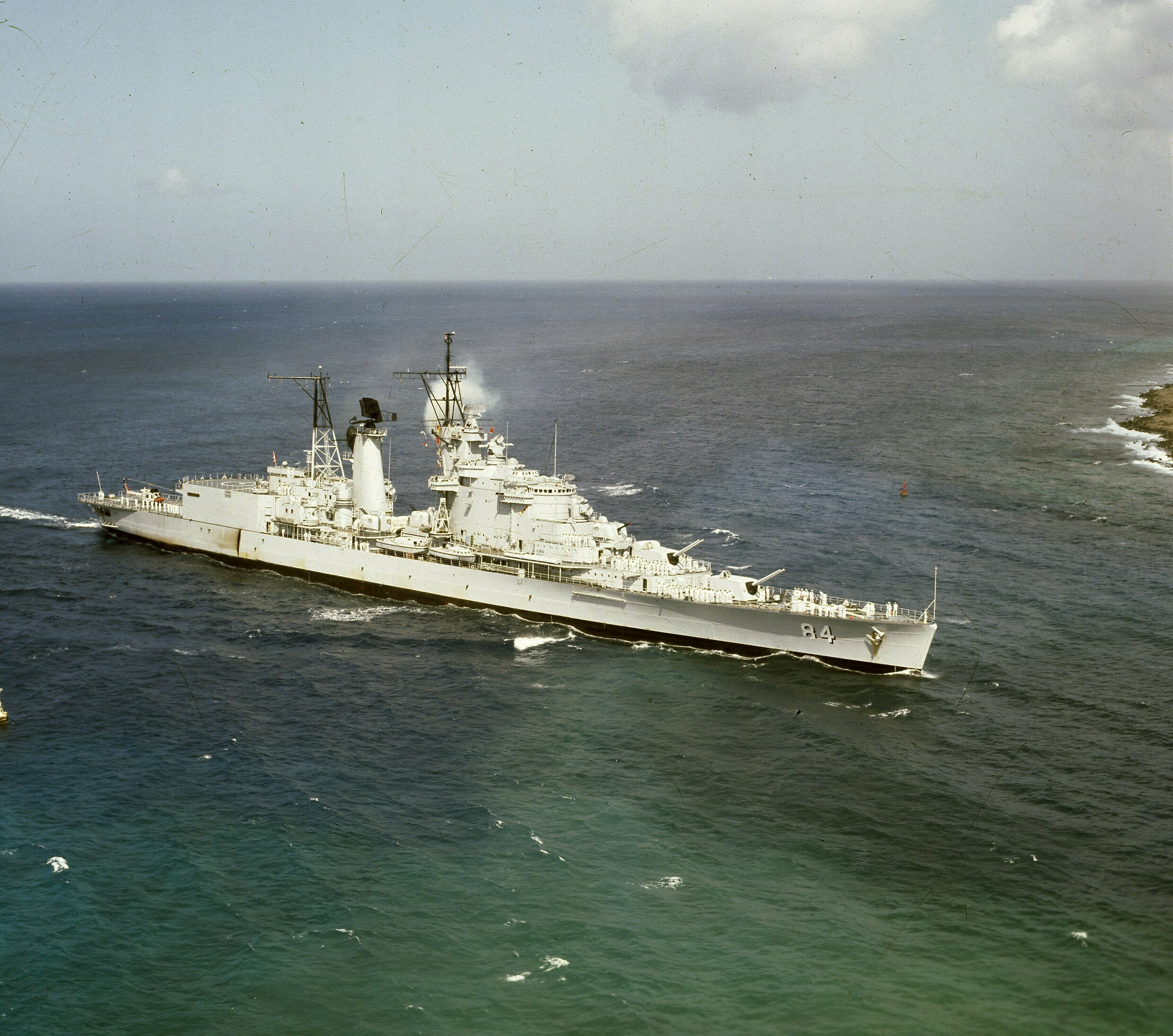
- BAP Aguirre (CH-84) in 1978

History

Netherlands
- Name: De Zeven Provinciën
- Builder: Rotterdamsche Droogdok Maatschappij, Rotterdam
- Laid down: September 5, 1939
- Launched: December 19, 1941
- Commissioned: November 18, 1953
- Decommissioned: August 1976
- Out of service: Sold to Peruvian Navy in August 1976
- Motto: Ad Victoriam
- Fate: Transferred to Peru in August 1976

Peru
- Name: Aguirre
- Acquired: August 1976
- Commissioned: February 24, 1978
- Decommissioned: March 21, 1999
- Renamed: BAP Almirante Grau between August 7, 1986 and February 15, 1988
- Home port: Callao
- Fate: Scrapped in 2000

General characteristics
- Class & type: De Zeven Provinciën-class cruiser
- Displacement: 9,681 tons standard; 12,165 tons full load
- Length: 187.32 m
- Beam: 17.25 m
- Draught: 6.72 m
- Propulsion: 4 Werkspoor-Yarrow three-drum boilers; 2 De Schelde Parsons geared steam turbines; 2 shafts; 85,000 shp (63,000 kW)
- Speed: 32 knots (59 km/h)
- Range: 6,900 nm at 12 knots (22 km/h)
- Complement: 47 officers, 606 enlisted
- Sensors & processing systems: 1 Signaal LW-02 early warning; 1 Signaal DA-02 surface search; 1 Signaal ZW-03 surface search; 1 Signaal M25 fire control; 3 Signaal M45 fire control; 2 Decca 1226 navigation; 1 CWE-610 N hull sonar
- Armament: 2 Bofors 152/53 twin guns; 3 twin Bofors 57/60 mm guns; 4 single Bofors 40/70 mm guns
- Armor: 50-76 mm belt; 50-125 mm turrets; 50-125 mm conning tower
- Aircraft carried: 3 ASH-3D Sea King helicopters
- Aviation facilities: Main flight deck: 35 × 17 m; Hangar roof helicopter platform: 20 × 16.46 m; Fixed hangar for 3 heavy helicopters.

BAP Aguirre (CH-84) was a De Zeven Provinciën-class cruiser in service with the Peruvian Navy. It was completed for the Royal Netherlands Navy in 1953 as HNLMS De Zeven Provinciën. After two decades in service, it was decommissioned in August 1976 and sold to Peru. Before being transferred to the Pacific Ocean, it underwent a major rebuild program by Rotterdamse Droogdok Maatschappij (RDM) at its shipyard in Rotterdam. Modifications included the removal of its RIM-2 Terrier SAM system and the installation of a fixed hangar and a flight deck. The upgrade was finished on October 31, 1977 and the ship was commissioned on February 24, 1978 at the Dutch naval base of Den Helder. Renamed Aguirre, in honor of the Peruvian Commander Elías Aguirre, it arrived to its new homeport of Callao on May 17, 1978.

In service, the Aguirre participated in several exercises, including the multinational UNITAS manoeuvres. From August 7, 1986 through February 15, 1988, while the BAP Almirante Grau (CLM-81) underwent a major refit in the Netherlands, the Aguirre was temporarily renamed Almirante Grau and designated as fleet flagship. By the 1990s the ship systems were beginning to show their age, but lack of funds prevented any major upgrade. Finally, on March 21, 1999, the ship was decommissioned.

== Sources ==
- Rodríguez Asti, John, Cruceros. Buques de la Marina de Guerra del Perú desde 1884. Dirección de Intereses Marítimos, 2000.
- Scheina, Robert L. & Smigielski, Adam (1995). "Peru". In Chumbley, Stephen (ed.). Conway's All the World's Fighting Ships, 1947–1995 (revised ed.). Naval Institute Press. pp. 303–307. ISBN 1-55750-132-7.
- Jane's Major Warships 2003
