= Kommendör =

Rank in the Swedish Navy

Captain kommendör
- Flag of the captain, Swedish Navy.

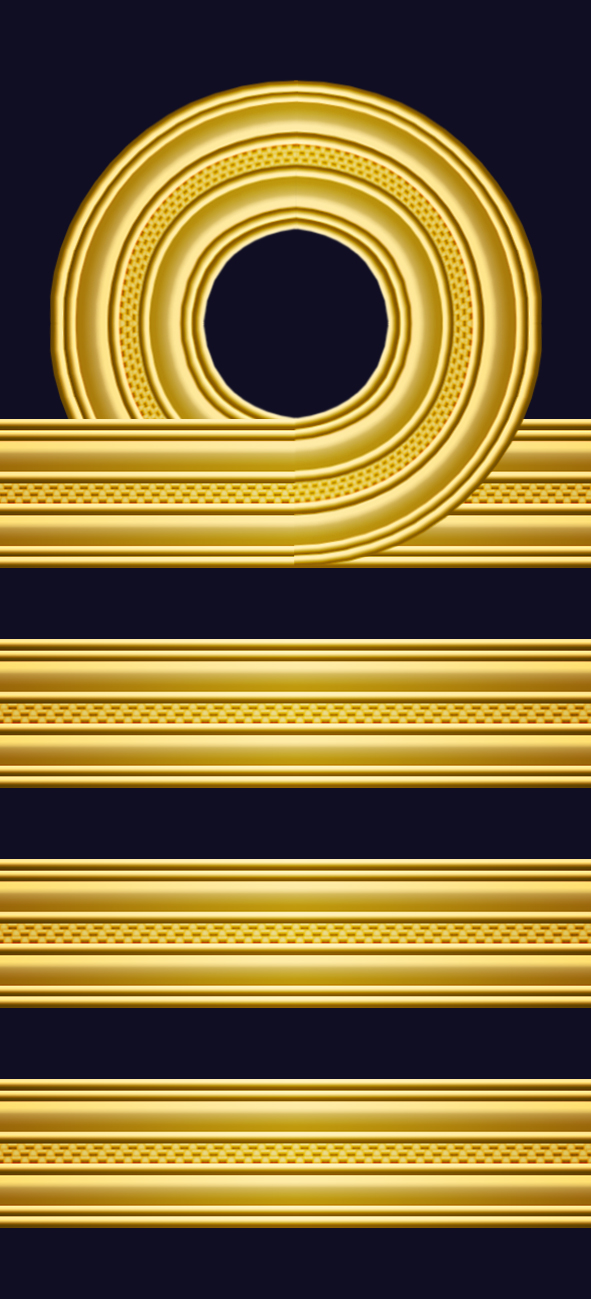
- Shoulder mark of a Swedish captain.

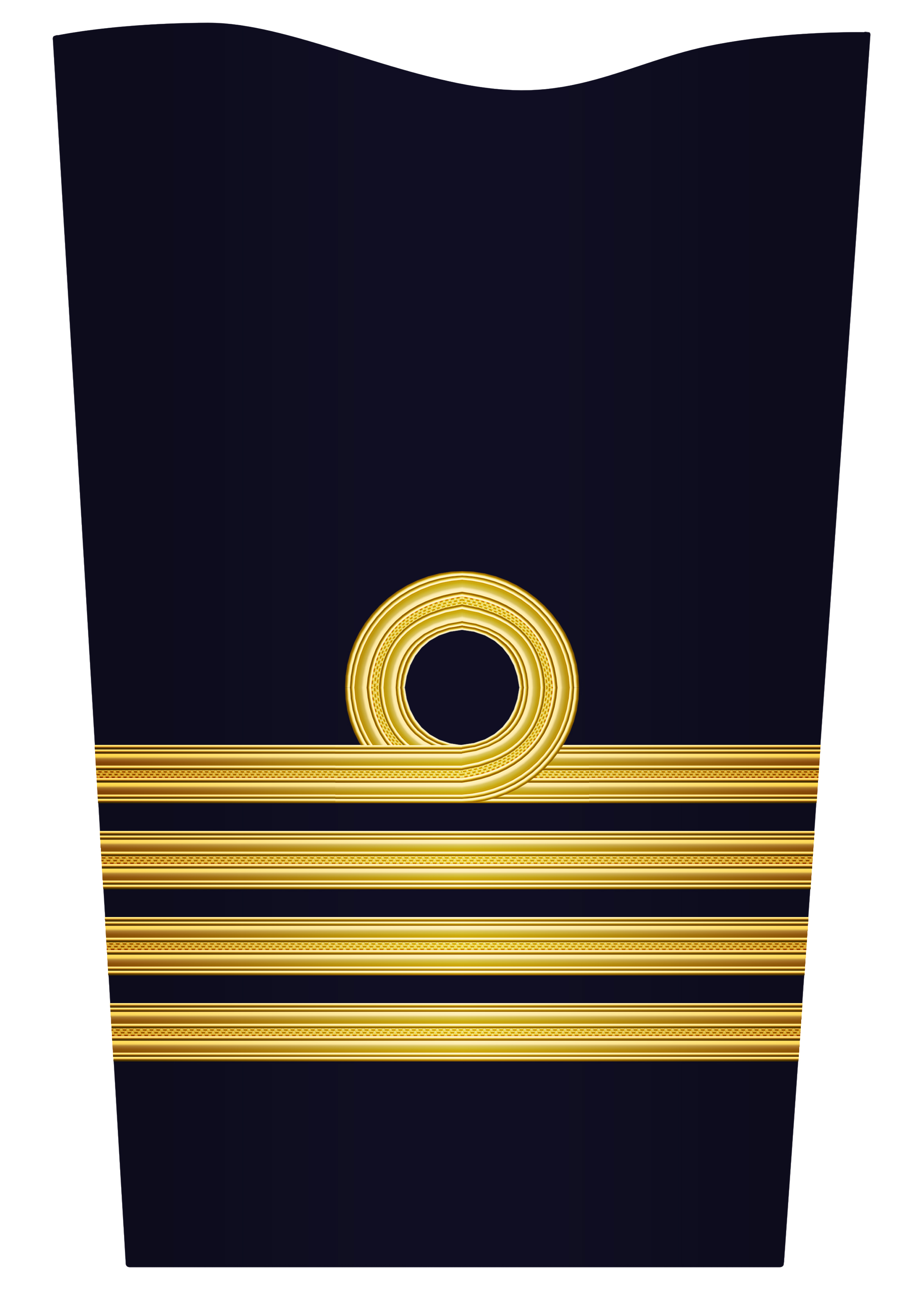
- Sleeve insignia of a Swedish captain.
- Country: Sweden
- Service branch: Swedish Navy
- Abbreviation: Kmd (Swedish), Capt (N) (English)
- Rank: Captain
- NATO rank code: OF-05
- Non-NATO rank: O-6
- Formation: 1600s
- Next higher rank: Rear admiral (lower half) (2000–); Senior captain (1972–2000); Rear admiral (–1972)
- Next lower rank: Commander
- Equivalent ranks: Colonel

Kommendör, abbreviated kmd (lit. 'Commodore', official Captain) is the most senior rank of commissioned officer below that of flag officer (i.e. admirals) in the Swedish Navy, ranking below rear admiral (lower half) and above commander. The rank is equivalent to colonel in the Swedish Army, Swedish Air Force and the Swedish Amphibious Corps.

== History ==
A captain used to serve as commander of ships of the line. The rank was introduced in 1674 as the title of the chief of staff of a squadron commander in the fleet. In 1729, there were thirteen captains admitted to the Admiralty of Sweden (Amiralitetskollegiet). Captain in the navy was changed in 1771 to colonel. During the 1824 regulation, the rank of colonel was changed to a new rank with the name commander of the 1st class (kommendörkapten av 1:a klassen), but in 1845 the rank of captain was reintroduced.

During the first half of the 20th century, the captain served on board as squadron commander, division commander (coastal defence ship division) and as flag captain, ashore as station commander or shipyard commander, head of the Royal Swedish Naval Materiel Administration, department head there and in the Naval Staff, corps commander, etc. There were eight captains in the Swedish Navy in 1911.

Previously, captain was a rank between rear admiral and commander of the 1st class (kommendörkapten av 1:a graden), then between kommendör av 1. graden (senior captain) and commander (kommendörkapten), but today it is a rank between rear admiral (lower half) and commander.

== Promotion ==
Responsible head of promotion for a captain is the Director of Human Resources at the Swedish Armed Forces Headquarters.

== Uniform ==
=== Shoulder mark ===
The top galloon is shaped like a "loop" for an officer in the Swedish Navy (the loop is shaped like a "grenade" for an officer in the Swedish Amphibious Corps). The rank insignia is worn on the shoulder mark to jacket and coat (jacka m/87, kappa m/87), as well as to blue wool sweater (blå ylletröja m/87), trench coat (trenchcoat m/84), sea coat (sjörock 93, black raincoat and to white shirt (vit skjorta m/78). Rank insignia on shoulder mark (axelklaffshylsa 02B) is worn on all garments with shoulder straps.

1. The shoulder mark (Axelklaffshylsa m/02B) is designed as galloons sewn directly to another shoulder mark (axelklaffshylsa m/87 blå).

2. Before 2003, captains wore three 8 mm gold galloons and a loop of 16 mm gold galloons m/51.

3. The wowen shoulder mark (AXELKLAFFSHYLSA M/02 INVÄVD KOMMENDÖR FLOTTAN) is worn on the naval combat dress (sjöstridsdräkt m/93), duty uniform (arbetsdräkt m/87 (blå)) and combat uniform (Fältuniform m/90 lätt, m/90 lätt blå, m/90 tropik (green, beige and blue)).

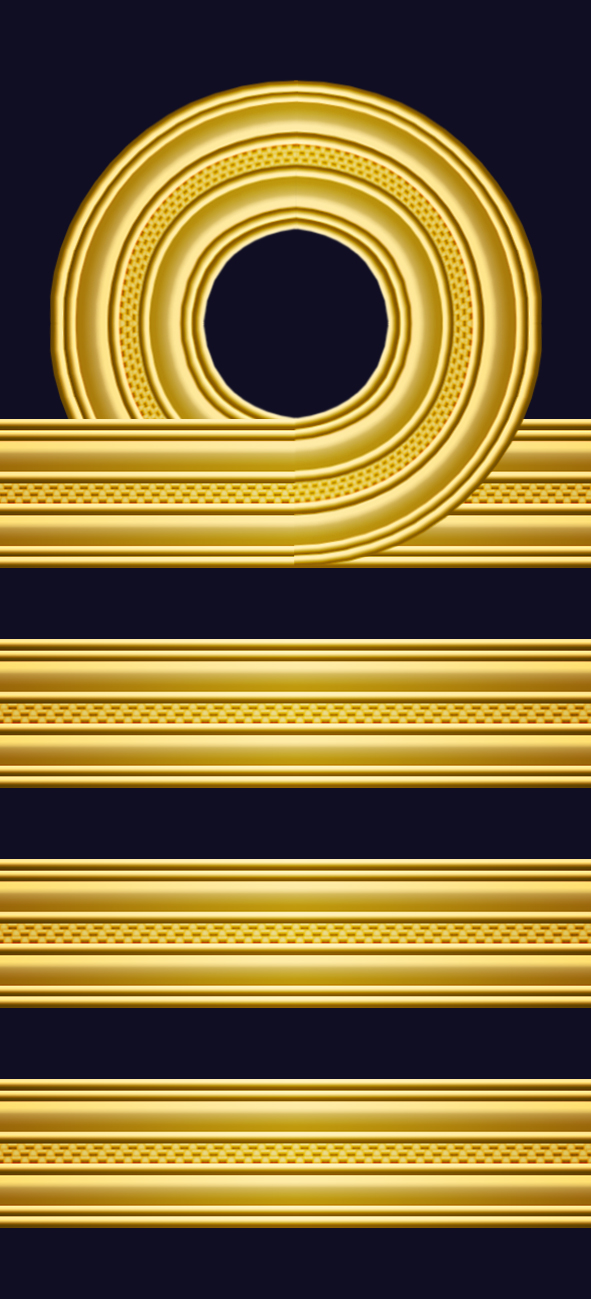
1. Embroidered shoulder mark (2003–present)

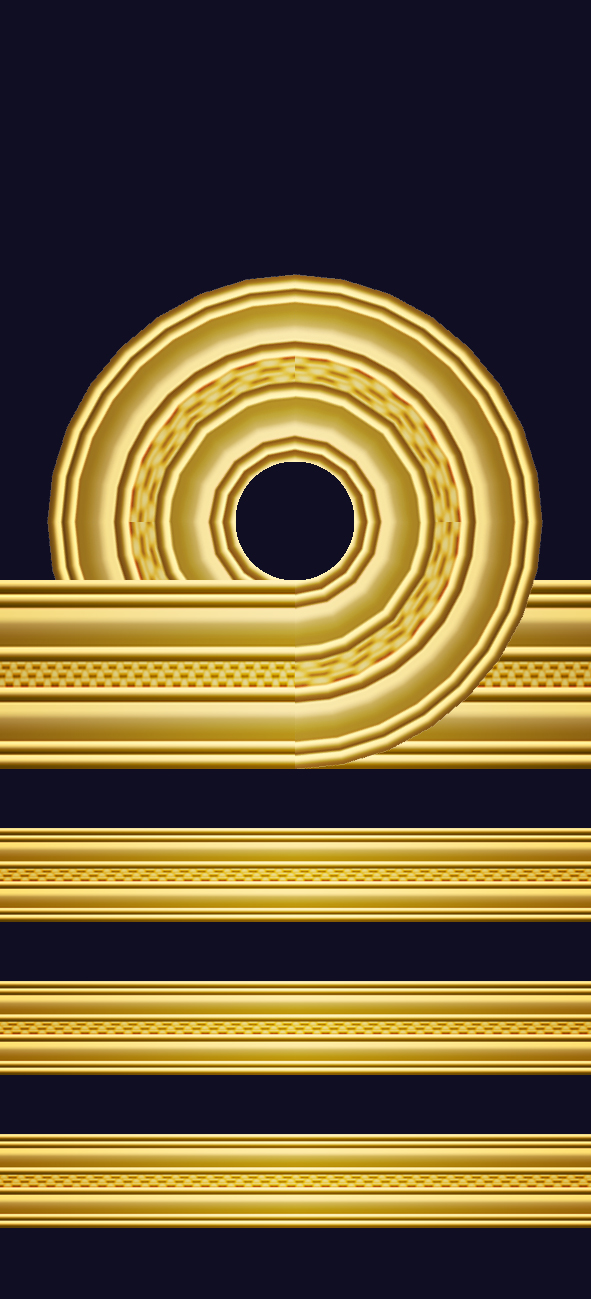
2. Embroidered shoulder mark (–2003)

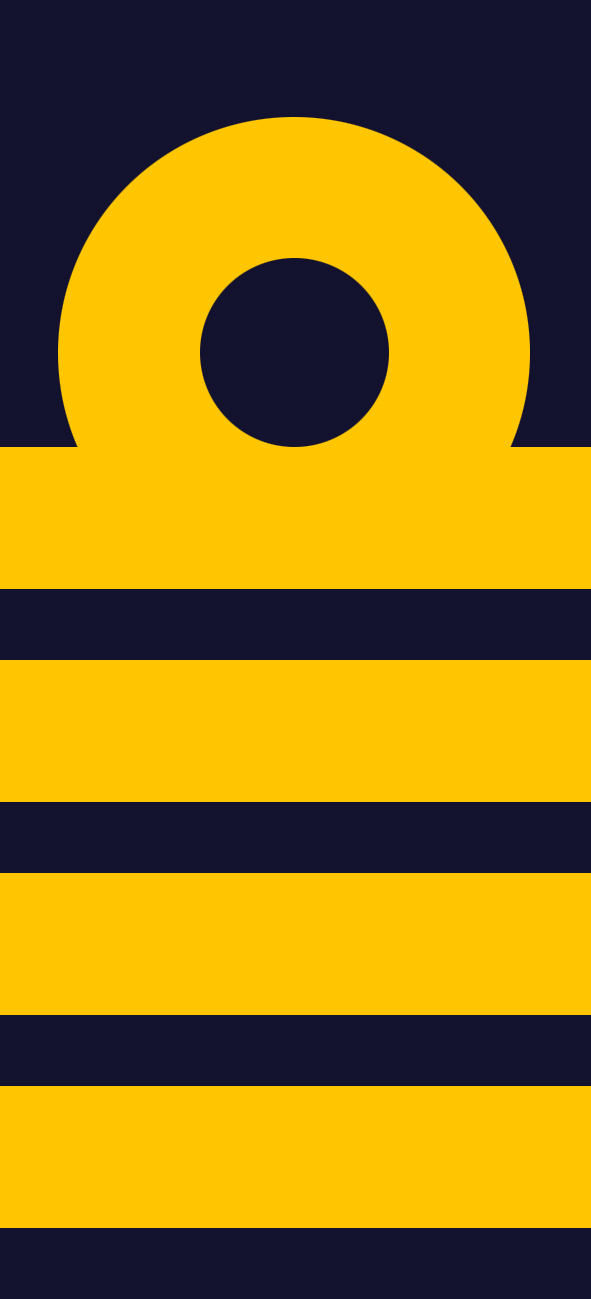
3. Wowen shoulder mark (2003–present)

=== Sleeve insignia ===
Rank insignia is worn on both sleeves for inner suit jacket (innerkavaj m/48) and mess jacket (mässjacka m/1878).

1. On the sleeve an 11 mm galloon m/51 with chevron and three 11 mm galloons m/51. Galloon 12.6 mm rank insignia (gradbeteckning m/02) (navy or amphibious corps). 12.6 mm galloon m/02 gradually replaces 11 mm galloon m/51. The distance between galloons should be 6 mm. The distance from the bottom edge of the sleeve to the bottom edge of the top galloon should be 100 mm. This sleeve insignia was worn by a commander (kommendörkapten) until 2003.

2. Before 2003, captains wore three 11 mm gold galloons and a loop of 23 mm gold galloon m/51.

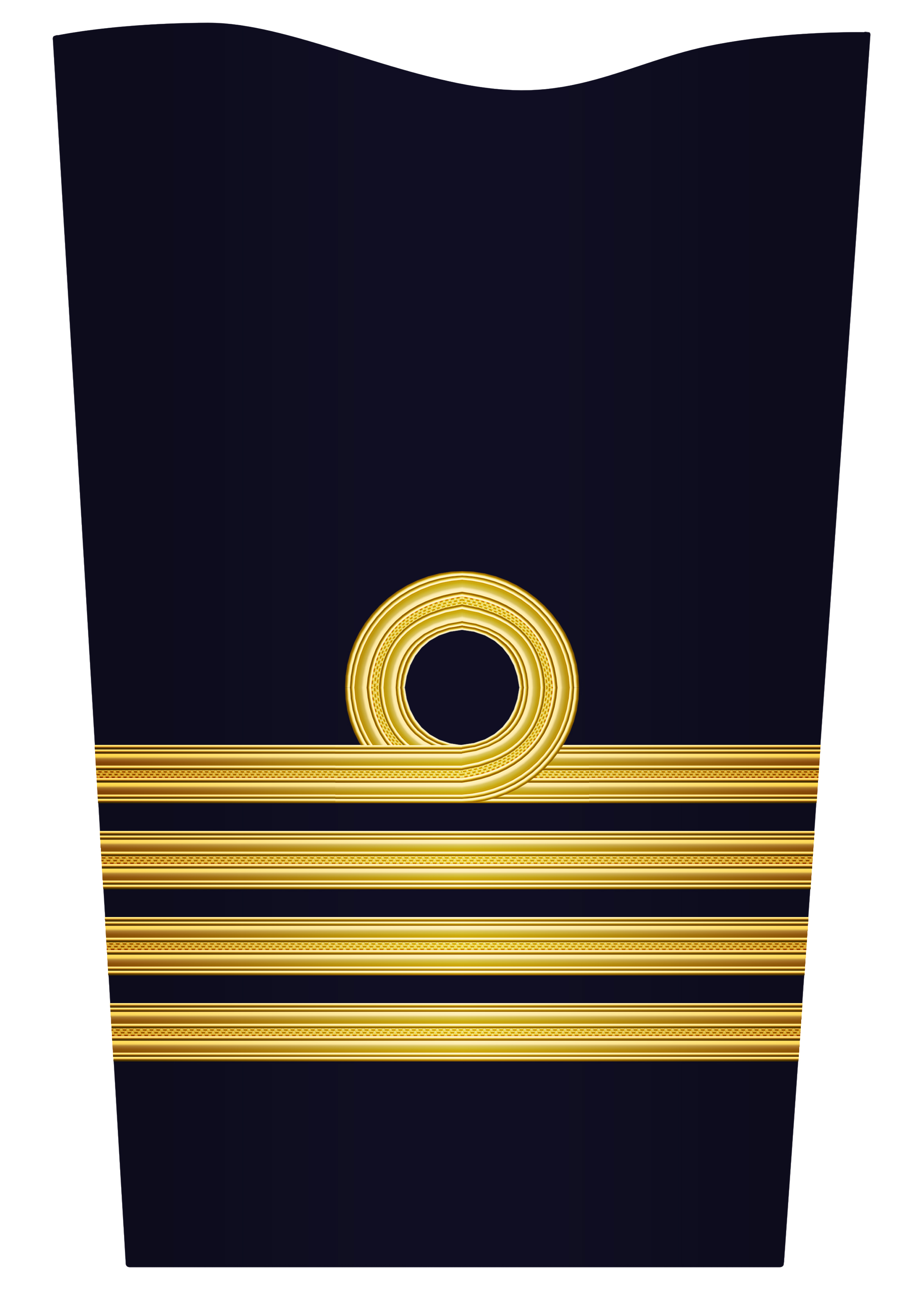
1. Sleeve insignia for a captain (2003–present)

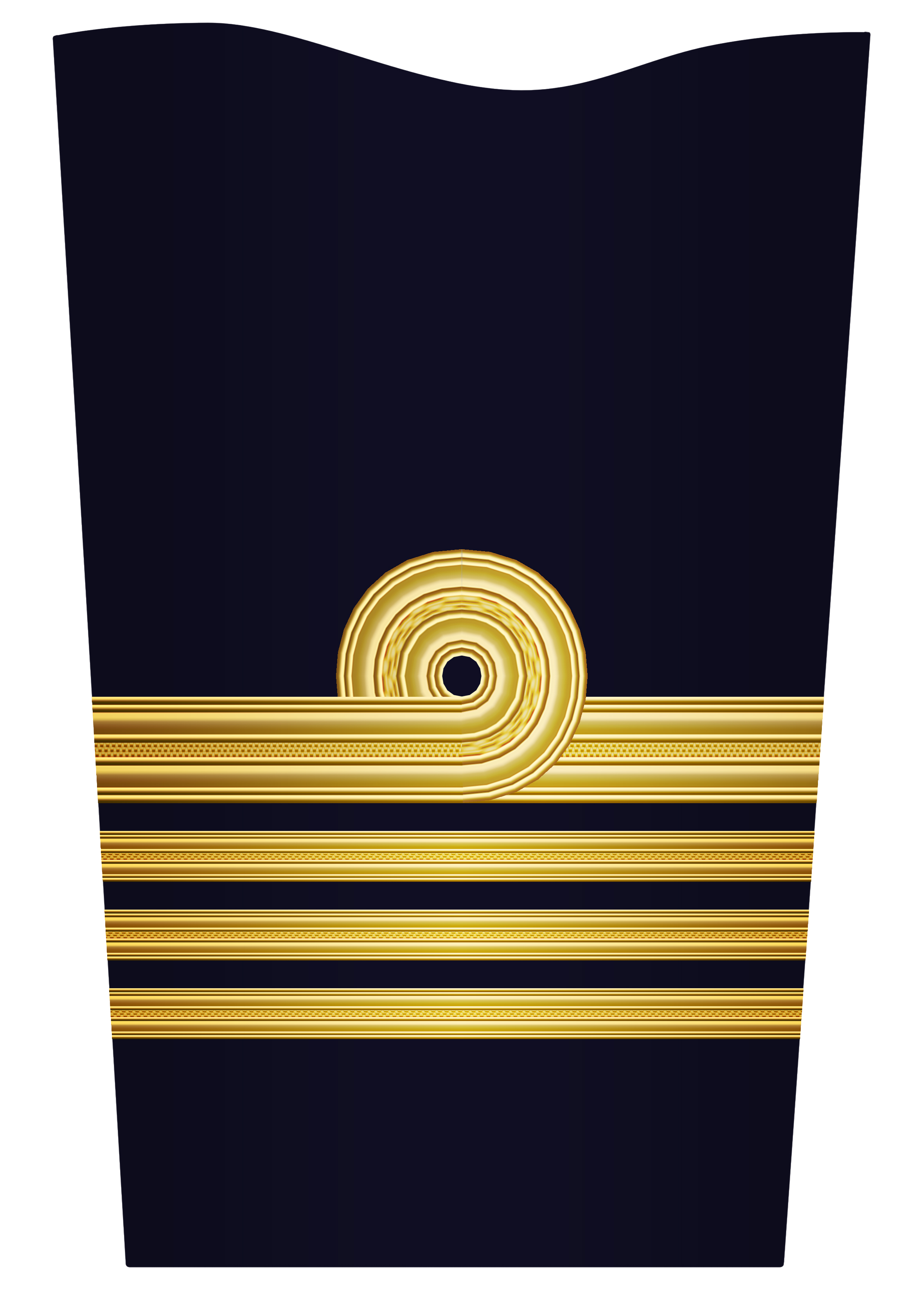
2. Sleeve insignia for a captain (?–2003)

=== Hats ===
==== Peaked cap ====
A captain wears as embellishments (known as scrambled egg) a gold embroidered laurel wreath (skärmbroderi m/49) on the visor of the peaked cap (skärmmössa m/48). It also fitted with a hat badge (mössmärke m/78 off för flottan) and with a strap in form of a golden braid (mössträns m/42).

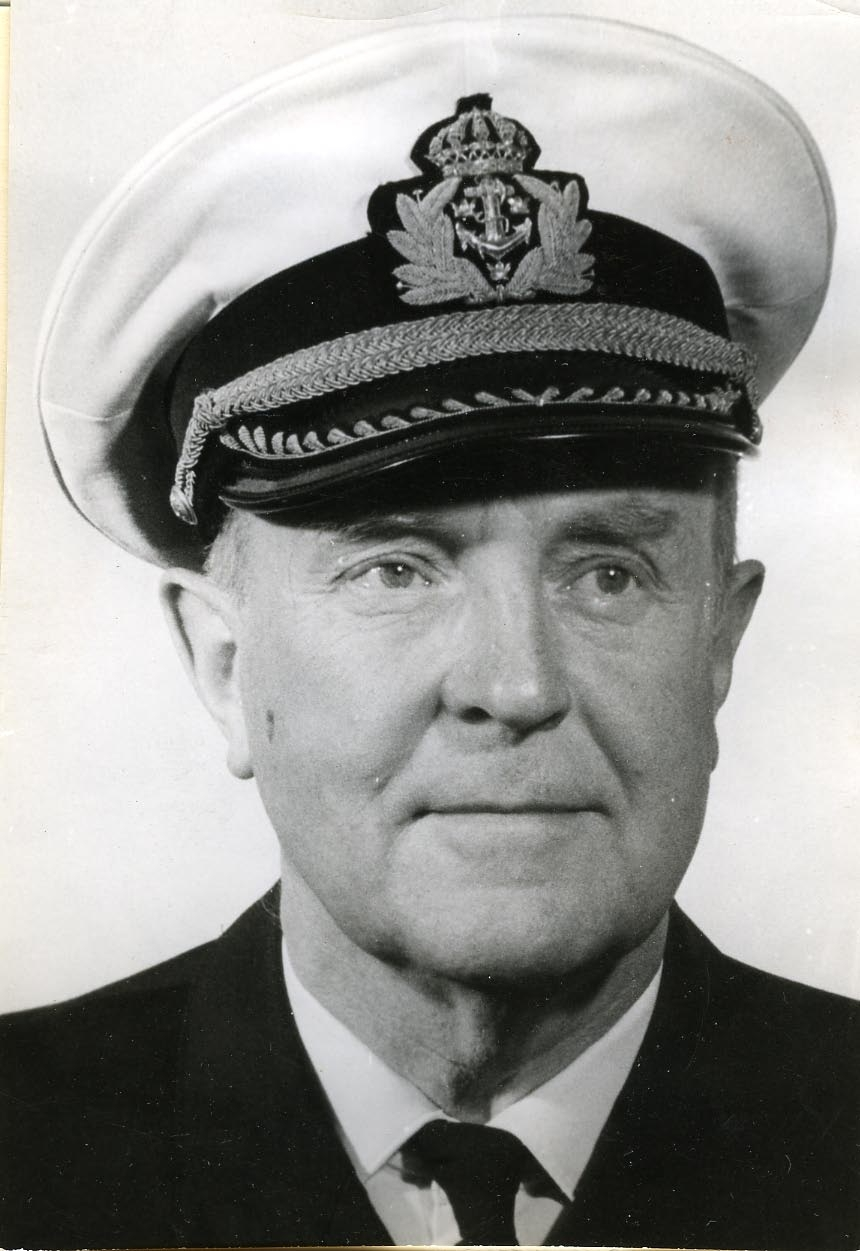
Peaked cap worn by Captain Harry Bong.

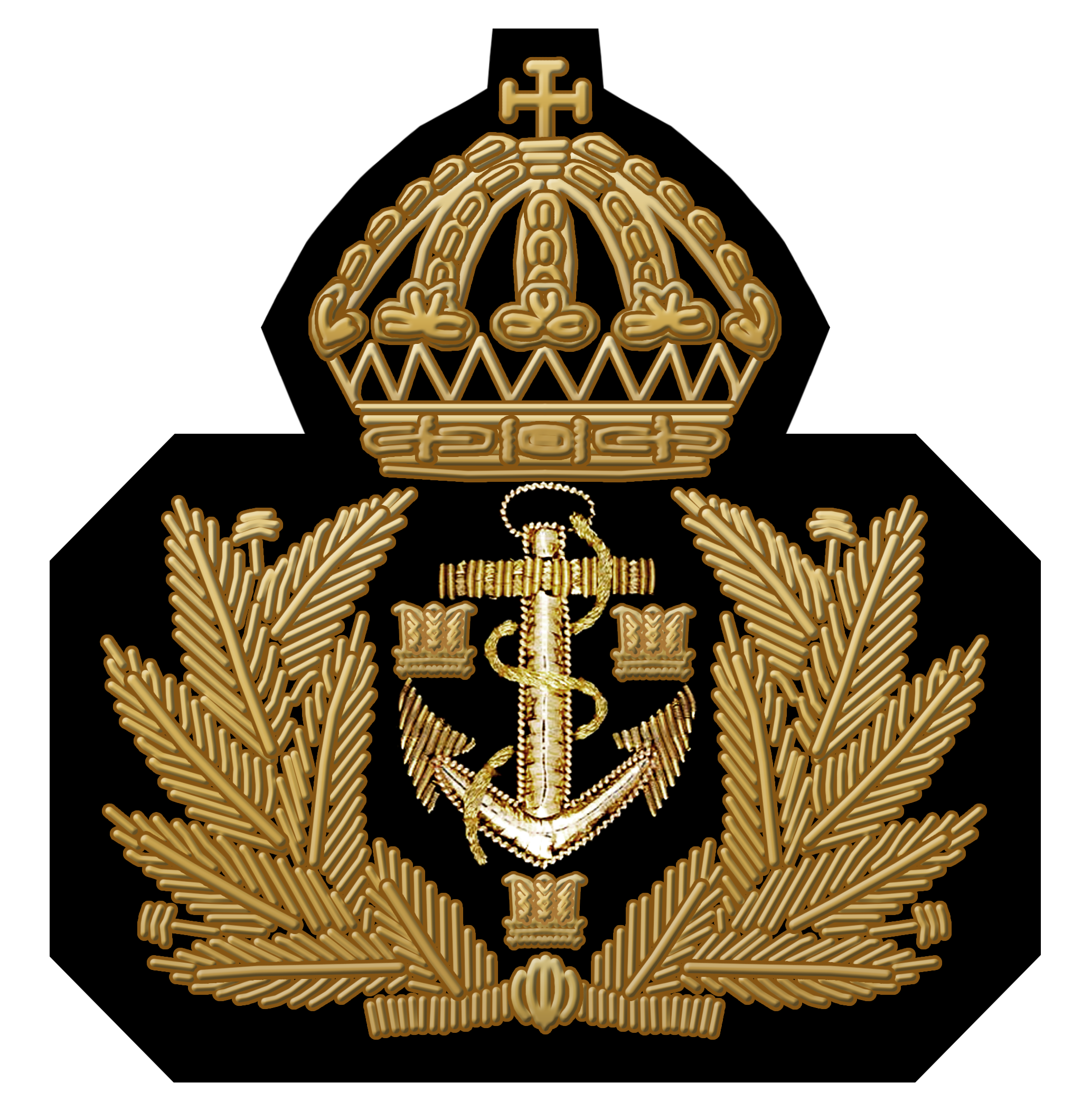
Hat badge

==== Side cap and winter hat ====
An officer wears a hat badge (mössmärke m/78 off) for the navy and another (mössmärke m/87 off) for amphibious units on the side cap (båtmössa m/48) and on the winter hat (vintermössa m/87).

=== Aiguillette ===
A captain wears a large aiguillette (stor ägiljett m/1816) to mess dress, service dress uniform in connection with representation (equivalent), and to full dress uniforms. For uniform parts without a shoulder strap (axelklaff), a shoulder girdle is used in the navy (if applicable with a royal name cipher) to attach a large aiguillette to the shoulder next to the shoulder seam. For the inner jacket (innerkavaj m/48) and the mess jacket, the aiguillette is attached to two small buttons under the coat.

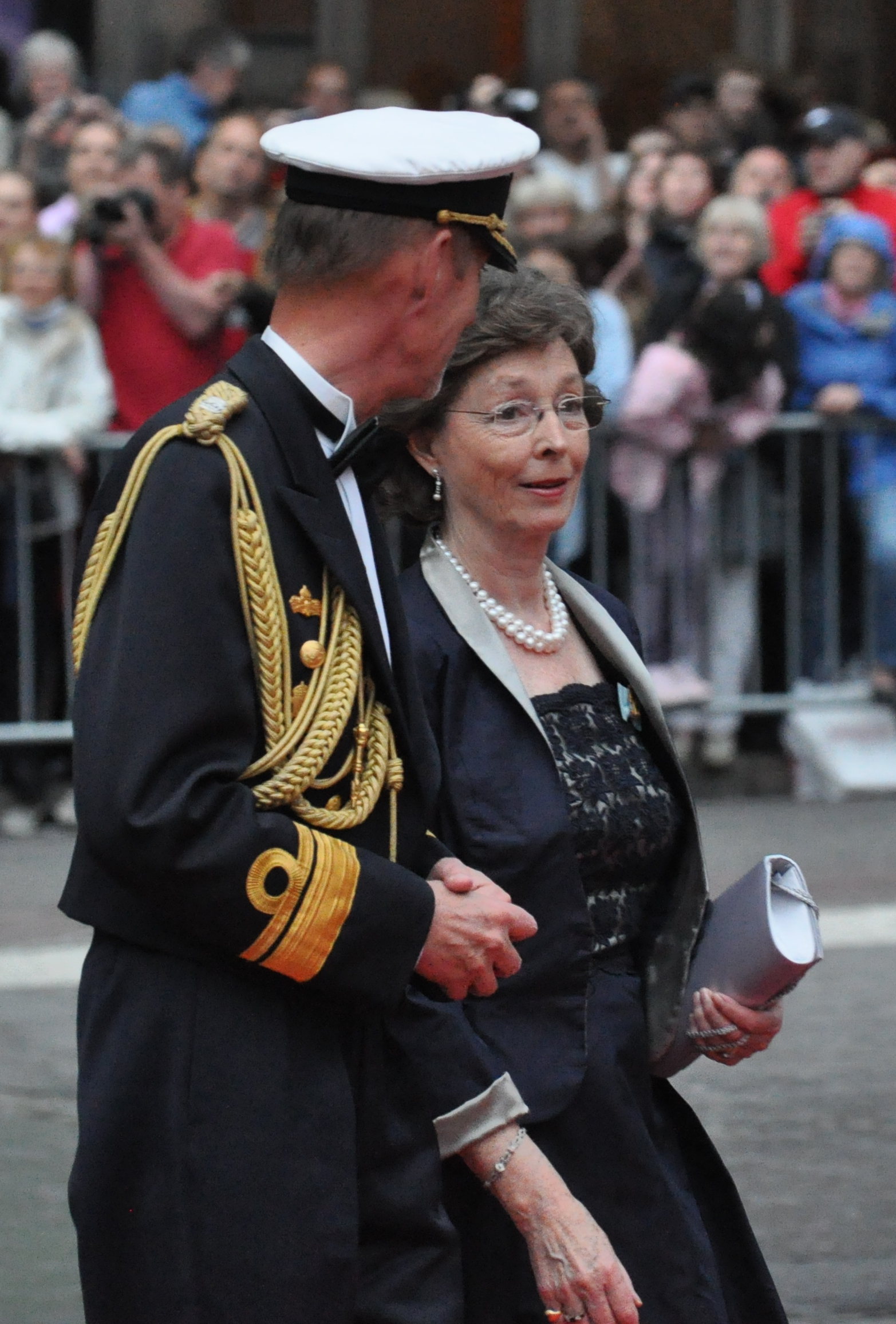
Large aiguillette (Stor ägiljett m/1816) on mess uniform

=== Epaulette ===
A captain wears epaulette's (epålett m/1878) to white tie (frack m/1878) and to coat (rock m/1878). On the epaulette, a captain wears 7 mm and 4 mm (within) fringe in two rows.

== Personal flags ==
The command flag of a captain (and for a senior captain, colonel and senior colonel), is the so-called Örlogsstandert ("Navy Standard"), which is a triangular swallowtailed flag per fess blue and yellow. The Navy Standard is carried on Swedish Navy ships, from which the captain exercises his command, or on which he travels in the service, but with the same restriction as for the admiral, etc. The command flag received its current appearance in 1927.

Örlogsstandert

== Gun salute ==
When raising or lowering flags of the commander's, squadron, department or division commander, a gun salute is given with 11 rounds for captain (17 for admiral, 15 for vice admiral and 13 for rear admiral).
