= Bofors 15,2 cm kanon m/42 =

15,2 cm kanon m/42
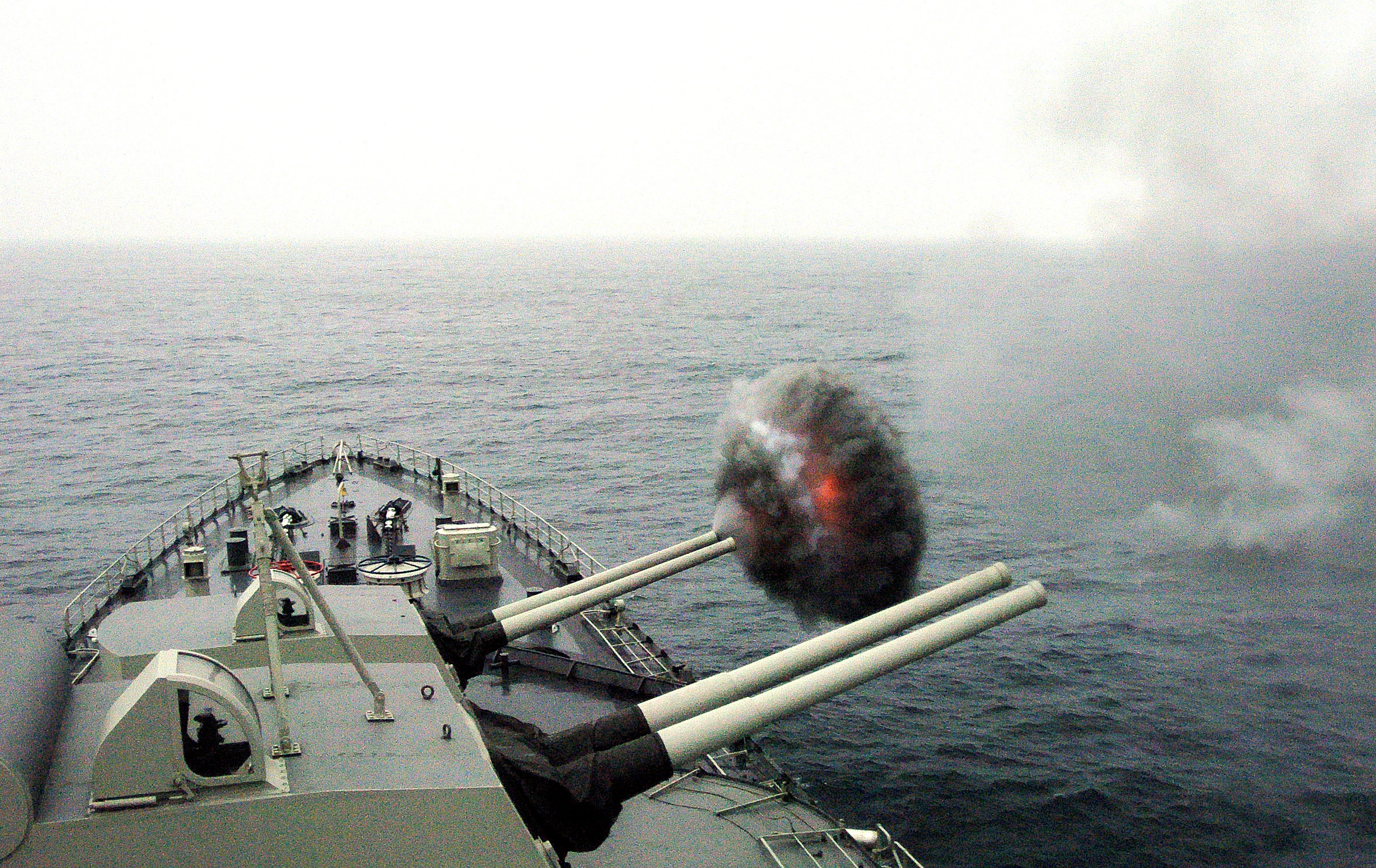
- BAP Almirante Grau firing its guns in the 2004 UNITAS Exercise
- Type: Naval gun
- Place of origin: Sweden

Service history
- In service: 1947–2017
- Used by: Swedish Navy; Royal Netherlands Navy; Chilean Navy; Peruvian Navy

Production history
- Designer: Bofors
- Designed: 1942
- Manufacturer: Bofors
- No. built: 30

Specifications
- Barrel length: 8.05 metres (317 in)
- Shell: 45 kilograms (99 lb)
- Caliber: 152 millimetres (6.0 in)
- Elevation: -10 to +60°
- Rate of fire: 12-15 shots /min
- Maximum firing range: 28,400 yards (26,000 m)

The Bofors 152 mm kanon m/42 is a naval gun for use on ships. It was initially used aboard light cruisers and cruisers including the Swedish Tre Kronor class and the Dutch De Zeven Provinciën class, after World War II. The last active ship to use the gun was the Peruvian Navy cruiser BAP Almirante Grau and was the largest naval gun still in active service prior to the commissioning of USS Zumwalt in October 2016, which is armed with the 155 mm Advanced Gun System.

The 152 mm gun was first designed in 1939 by Bofors for the Koninklijke Marine cruiser Kijkduin, eventually named De Zeven Provinciën. After the German invasion of the Netherlands in 1940 these artillery pieces were confiscated by the Swedish Government and placed on the Swedish cruiser HSwMS Tre Kronor.
