= HNLMS De Zeven Provinciën (C802) =

Dutch and Peruvian cruiser (1953–1999)

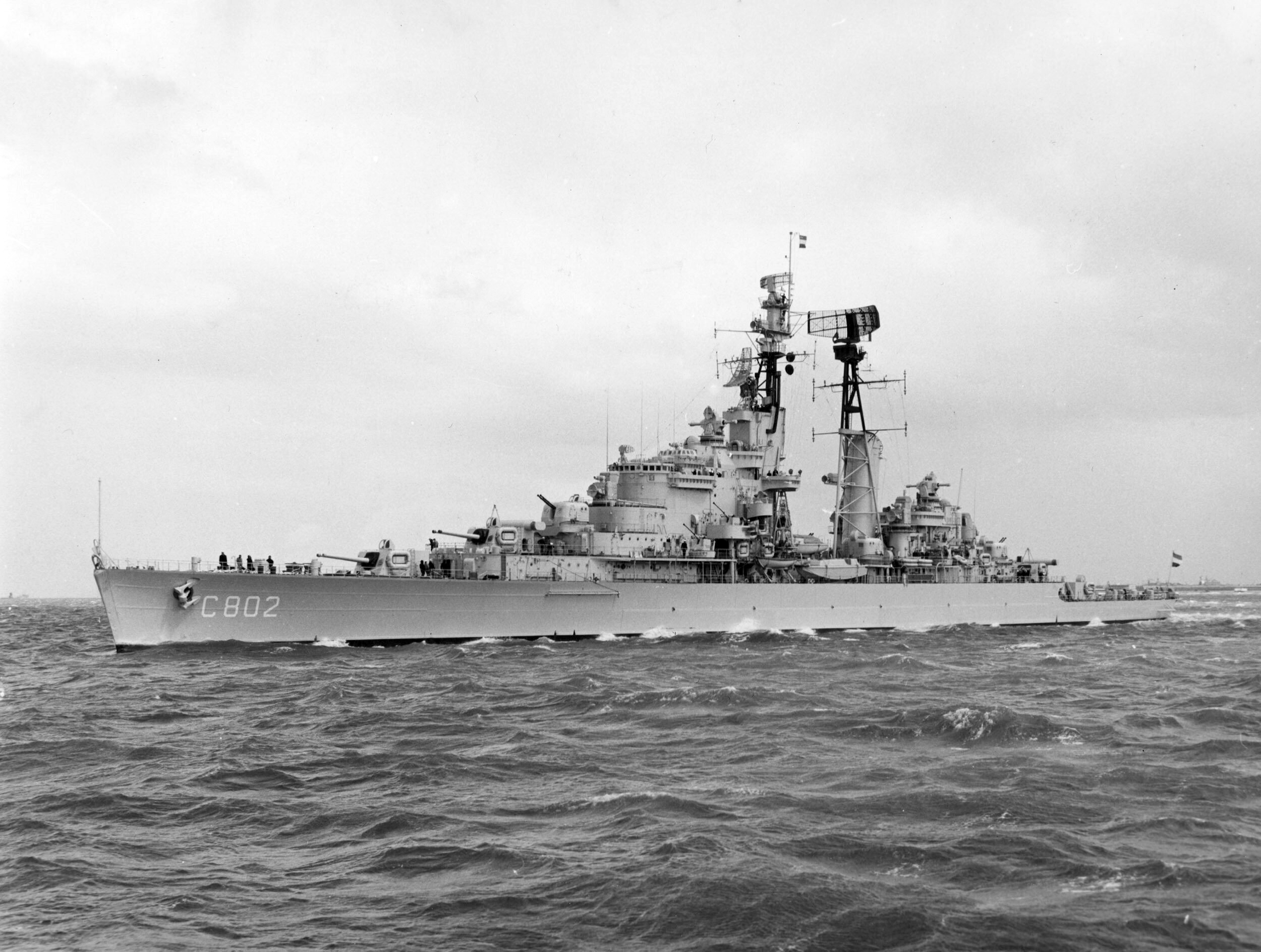
- De Zeven Provinciën before 1962

History

Netherlands
- Name: De Zeven Provinciën
- Builder: Rotterdamsche Droogdok Maatschappij, Rotterdam
- Yard number: RDM-219
- Laid down: 5 September 1939
- Launched: 22 August 1950
- Commissioned: 18 November 1953
- Identification: C802
- Fate: Sold to Peruvian Navy in August 1976, scrapped 2000

General characteristics
- Class & type: De Zeven Provinciën-class cruiser
- Displacement: 9,681 tons standard; 12,250 tons full load
- Length: 187.32 m (614.6 ft)
- Beam: 17.25 m (56.6 ft)
- Draught: 6.72 m (22.0 ft)
- Propulsion: 4 Werkspoor-Yarrow three-drum boilers; 2 De Schelde Parsons geared steam turbines; 2 shafts; 85,000 shp
- Speed: 32 kn (59 km/h; 37 mph)
- Range: 6,900 nmi (12,800 km; 7,900 mi) at 12 kn (22 km/h; 14 mph)
- Complement: 926
- Armament: 8 × Bofors 152/53 twin guns; 8 × 57 mm twin guns; 8 × Bofors 40/70 mm single guns; 1962 rebuild: 4 × Bofors 152 mm guns; 6 × Bofors 57 mm guns; 4 × Bofors 40 mm guns; 4 × 152 mm, 2 × 57 mm, and 4 × 40 mm guns replaced by a RIM-2 Terrier launcher (1962)
- Armor: 50–76 mm (2.0–3.0 in) belt; 50–125 mm (2.0–4.9 in) turrets; 50–125 mm (2.0–4.9 in) conning tower

HNLMS De Zeven Provinciën was a De Zeven Provinciën-class cruiser of the Royal Netherlands Navy. Laid down in 1939, construction was interrupted by World War II and the ship was only commissioned in 1953 with the identification number C802. She served until 1976 when she was purchased by Peru and renamed Aguirre. With the Peruvian Navy she served until 1999 and was scrapped in 2000.

== Design ==
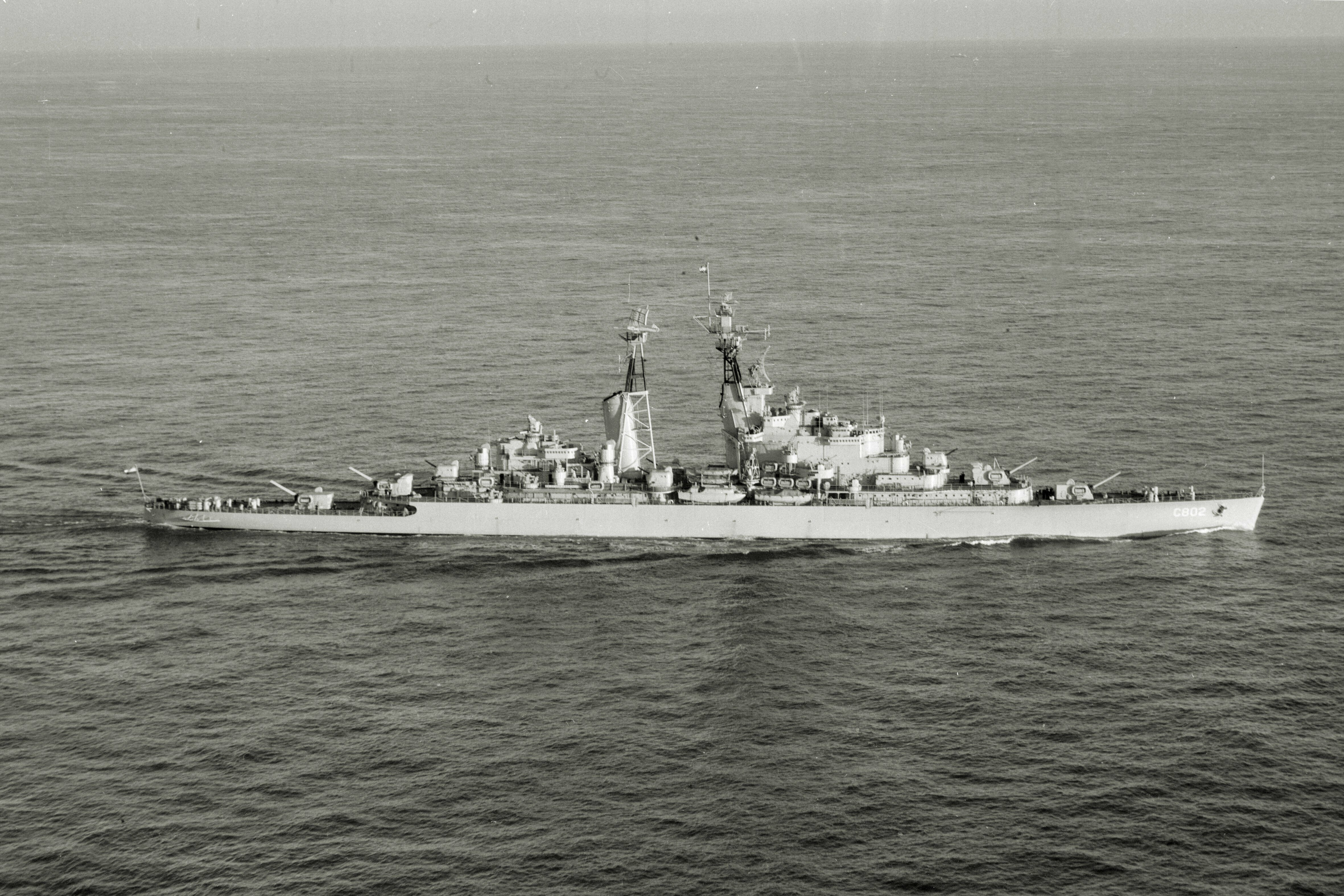
De Zeven Provinciën in 1956

De Zeven Provinciën was armed with eight 152 mm (6.0 in) guns in double turrets, 8 × 57 mm in twin turrets and 8 × 40 mm machine guns. The rear turrets were replaced between 1962 and 1964 with a RIM-2 Terrier SAM system. She was 185.7 m (609 ft) long, had a beam of 17.25 m (56.6 ft) and a draft of 6.85 m (22.5 ft). She displaced 12,250 t and could achieve a speed of 32.2 kn (59.6 km/h; 37.1 mph). She had a crew of 957.

During her service with the Peruvian Navy she was converted to a helicopter cruiser. To do this the remaining turrets at the back of the ship were removed to make space for a hangar and a flight deck big enough to support 4 helicopters.

== History ==
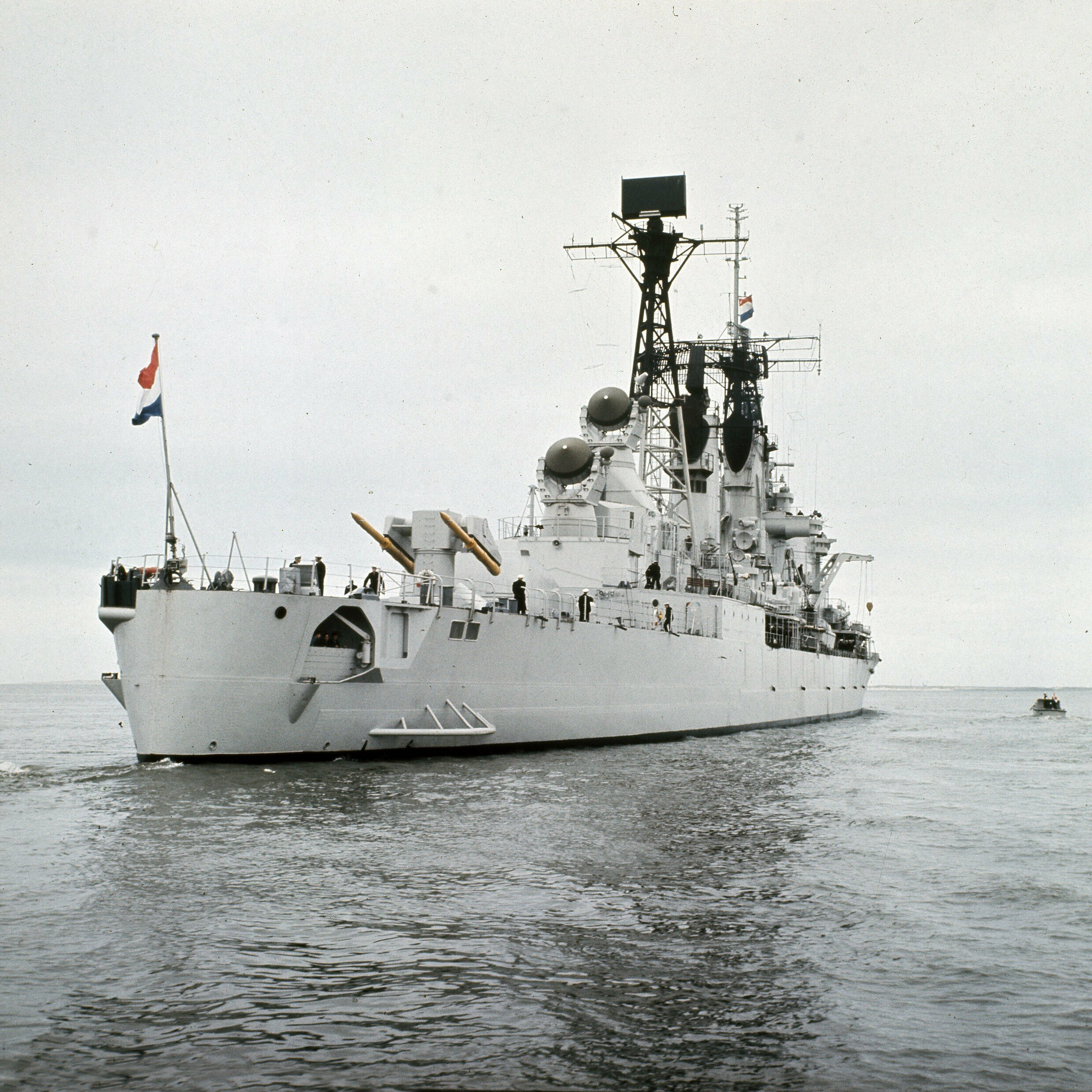
In 1962, the cruiser was upgraded to carry the RIM-2 Terrier missile system, which replaced the three rear turrets.

Construction started in 1939 as Kijkduin, but was interrupted by World War II. She was renamed Eendracht in 1940 and De Ruyter in 1945. Her sister ship was launched in 1944 as De Zeven Provinciën, but the ships swapped to their final names in 1950. She was completed in 1953 and served the Royal Netherlands Navy from 1950 to 1975. In 1968 she was docked at the shipyard of RDM for maintenance. She was sold to Peru in August 1976 and was renamed BAP Aguirre on 24 February 1978.
