= De Zeven Provinciën-class cruiser =

1953 light cruiser class of the Royal Netherlands Navy

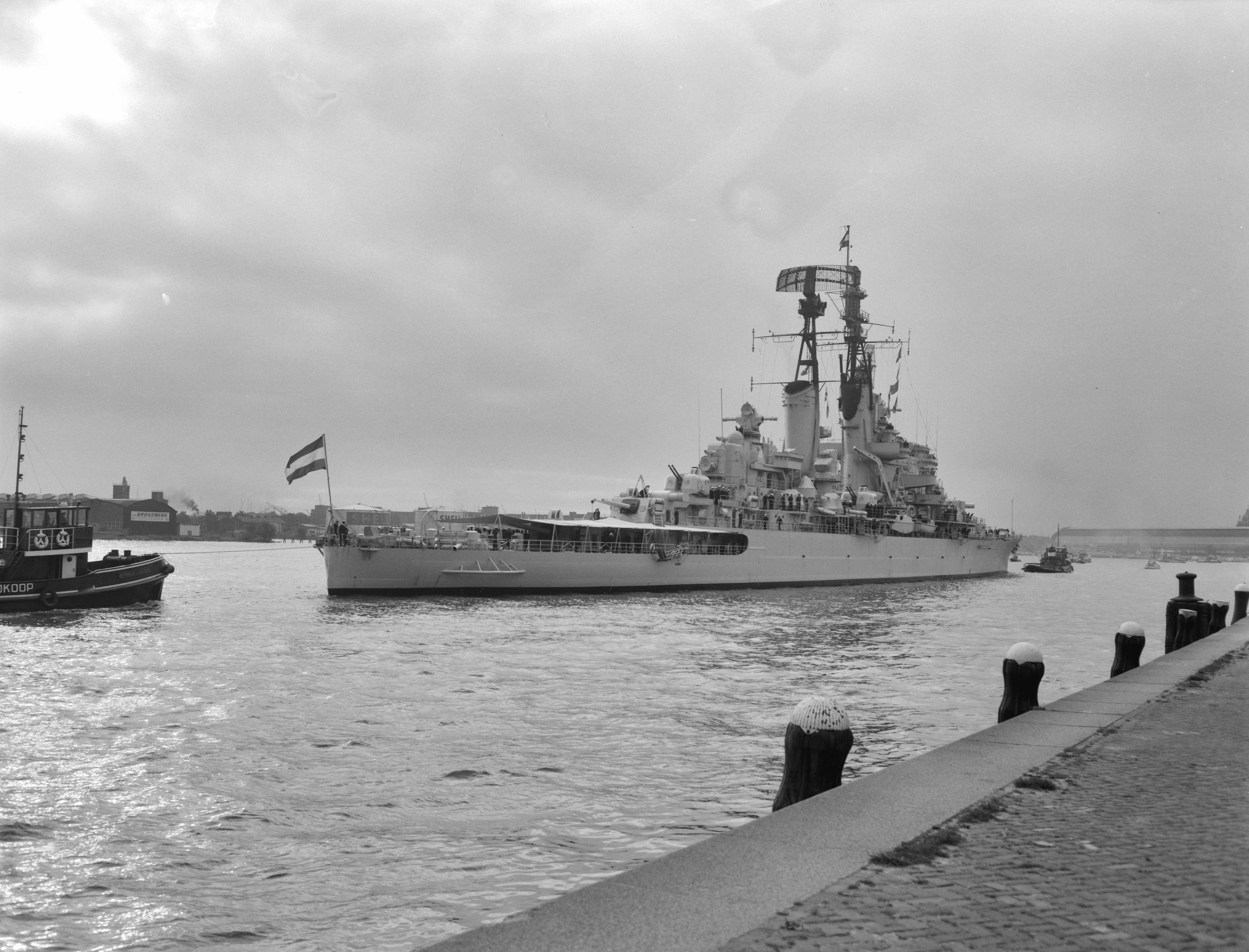
- Stern view of HNLMS De Ruyter, 1962

Class overview
- Builders: Rotterdamsche Droogdok Maatschappij; Wilton-Fijenoord
- Operators: Royal Netherlands Navy; Peruvian Navy
- Preceded by: De Ruyter
- Succeeded by: Tromp-class frigate
- Cost: Approx. ƒ 126-190m (whole project)
- Built: 1939–1953 (Note: Construction delayed by World War II)
- In commission: 1953–2017
- Completed: 2
- Scrapped: 2

General characteristics
- Type: Light Cruiser
- Displacement: 12,040 tonnes
- Length: 187.32 m (614.6 ft)
- Beam: 17.25 m (56.6 ft)
- Draught: 6.72 m (22.0 ft)
- Propulsion: 4 Werkspoor-Yarrow three-drum boilers; 2 De Schelde Parsons geared steam turbines; 2 shafts; 85,000 shp
- Speed: 32 kn (59 km/h; 37 mph)
- Range: 7,000 nmi (13,000 km; 8,100 mi) at 12 kn (22 km/h; 14 mph)
- Complement: 973
- Armament: 8 × 152 mm main guns; 8 × 57 mm AA guns (4x2); 8 × 40 mm AA guns
- Armour: 50–76 mm (2.0–3.0 in) belt; 50–125 mm (2.0–4.9 in) turrets; 50–125 mm (2.0–4.9 in) conning tower

The De Zeven Provinciën class (also called Eendracht class) was a class of light cruisers. They were built by Rotterdamsche Droogdok Maatschappij (RDM) and Wilton-Fijenoord for the Royal Netherlands Navy. The name De Zeven Provinciën refers to the seven provinces which formed the Dutch Republic in 1581.

== Design ==
In the 1930s there was an increased awareness in the Netherlands about the threat which the Imperial Japanese Navy posed to the Dutch East Indies. To face this, the Koninklijke Marine embarked on a major naval expansion program in 1932, which included building two new light cruisers as replacements for the aging Java-class cruisers. The design was an improvement of the earlier HNLMS De Ruyter and both ships were laid down in 1939. The first was named Kijkduin, later changed to Eendracht, and the second one received the name De Zeven Provinciën, hence the name of the class. The main armament was designed as two triple and two twin Bofors 152 mm/53 caliber guns.

However, construction was interrupted by the German invasion of the Netherlands on 10 May 1940. De Zeven Provinciën was 25% completed and Kijkduin 12%. The Germans redesigned the ships main armament. De Zeven Provinciën was planned with four dual turrets 15 cm SK C/28 guns. Eendracht was planned with smaller guns taken from a broken down battleship, but the exact gun types are unknown. The Germans continued work on De Zeven Provinciën which was more advanced than its twin; it was renamed KH1 ("KH" means "Kreuzer Holland") and modified by fitting an Atlantik Bow. Eendracht was renamed KH2. Work progressed very slowly as the dockyards' capacity was used for other purposes and sabotage by the Dutch resistance affected progress. On 24 December 1944, KH1 was launched for use as a blockship in the Nieuwe Waterweg of Rotterdam but this action was never carried out.

After the end of World War II, construction resumed on both ships to a modified design which incorporated the lessons of the war. Armament was modified from two triple and two twin Bofors 152 mm/53 guns, six twin 40 mm AA and two triple 533 mm torpedo tubes to four twin Bofors 152 mm/53 guns, four twin Bofors 57 mm/60 guns and eight single Bofors 40 mm/70 guns. An improved propulsion plant was fitted as well as a second funnel and advanced electronics. Names were also changed with Eendracht becoming De Zeven Provinciën and the former De Zeven Provinciën being renamed De Ruyter. Both ships were finally commissioned by the Royal Netherlands Navy in 1953.

	1938	1939	1940	1940/41	1945	1947	1950	1978
RDM	Kruiser 1939	Kijkduin	Eendracht	KH 2	Eendracht	De Ruyter	De Zeven Provinciën (C802)	Aguirre
Wilton Fijenoord	Kruiser 1938	De Zeven Provinciën	De Zeven Provinciën	KH 1	De Zeven Provinciën	De Zeven Provinciën	De Ruyter (C801)	Almirante Grau

== Ships in class ==
There were two ships in the class: HNLMS De Zeven Provinciën (renamed De Ruyter in 1947) and Kijkduin (renamed Eendracht c. 1940, De Ruyter in 1944 and De Zeven Provinciën in 1947). Both ships enjoyed long service lives, first in the Koninklijke Marine (until the early 1970s) and then in the Marina de Guerra del Perú.

De Zeven Provinciën class construction data
Name	Pennant number	Builder	Laid down	Launched	Commissioned	Decommissioned	Fate
De Zeven Provinciën (ex-Kijkduin, ex-Eendracht, ex-De Ruyter)	C802	Rotterdamsche Droogdok Maatschappij, Rotterdam	19 May 1939	22 August 1950	18 November 1953	16 October 1975	Sold to Peru, August 1976; Decommissioned, March 1999; Scrapped, 2000
De Ruyter (ex-De Zeven Provinciën)	C801	Wilton-Fijenoord, Schiedam	5 September 1939	24 December 1944	18 November 1953	12 October 1972	Sold to Peru, March 1973; Decommissioned, September 2017; Planned to be preserved as a museum ship; Sold for scrap July 2022.

== Royal Netherlands Navy ==
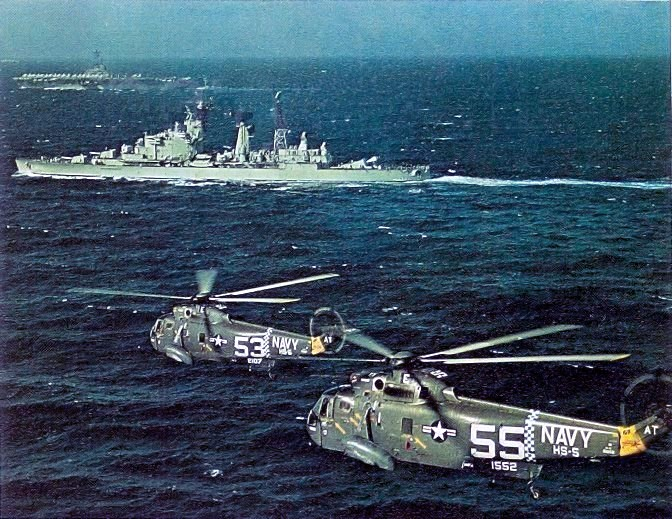
De Zeven Provinciën operating with the US aircraft carrier USS Essex in 1967.

In Dutch service both ships participated in several NATO exercises, and were frequently used as flagships for different naval task forces. Between 1962 and 1964, De Zeven Provinciën underwent a refit by RDM which included the removal of the two aft turrets and the installation of a RIM-2 Terrier SAM system. Lack of funds precluded the same modifications from being carried out in De Ruyter, which was decommissioned in 1972. Her sister ship followed suit in 1975; the cruisers were replaced in Dutch service by the two Tromp-class frigates.

== Peruvian Navy ==
De Ruyter was acquired by the Peruvian Navy and recommissioned in 1973 as fleet flagship BAP Almirante Grau. De Zeven Provinciën was also purchased in 1976, its RIM-2 Terrier SAM removed and replaced by a hangar and a flight deck for ASH-3D Sea King helicopters. On 16 November 1977 she left the shipyard of RDM as BAP Aguirre. From 1985 until 1988 Almirante Grau underwent a major modernization by Amsterdam Naval Services (ANS), which allowed the ship to remain in service, whereas Aguirre was decommissioned in 1999. Almirante Grau was decommissioned in 2017, and in 2019, it was to be said that she would be preserved as a museum ship. However, it was later announced in February 2022 the Peruvian Government decided to open tender for the sale of the ship. By July 2022 the ship was moved out of its harbour in Peru to be scrapped.

== See also ==
- List of cruisers of the Netherlands

== Citations ==
=== Bibliography ===
- Chesneau, Roger, ed. (1980). Conway's All the World's Fighting Ships 1922-1946. Greenwich: Conway Maritime Press. ISBN 978-0-85177-146-5.
- Moore, John (ed.), Jane's Fighting Ships 1974–75. Franklin Watts Inc., 1975.
- (in Spanish) Rodríguez Asti, John, Cruceros. Buques de la Marina de Guerra del Perú desde 1884. Dirección de Intereses Marítimos, 2000.
- netherlandsnavy.nl
- Veenstra, A.J.C. (1986). De kruisers De Ruyter en De Zeven Provinciën. Meppel: Ten Brink. ISBN 978-90-248-7502-3.
- Karremann, Jaime (January 20, 2015). "Kruisers De Ruyter en De Zeven Provinciën (1953)" (in Dutch). marineschepen.nl. Archived from the original on March 25, 2017.
- Teitler, G. (1984). De strijd om de slagkruisers. Dieren: De Bataafsche Leeuw. ISBN 978-9067070287.
- van Dijk, A. (1988). "Re: The Dutch Shipbuilding Program of 1939". Warship International. XXV (3): 225. ISSN 0043-0374.
- W.H.E., van Amstel (1991). De schepen van de Koninklijke Marine vanaf 1945. Alkmaar: De Alk. ISBN 978-9060139974.
