= Military equipment of Sweden during World War II =

Sweden was formally a non-belligerent nation throughout World War II, but saw considerable military build-up as the level of threat from the Soviet Union, United Kingdom or Nazi Germany increased. Between 10,000 and 20,000 Swedes fought as volunteers abroad, a majority of them in service of Finland during the Winter War.

== Army ==
=== Small arms ===
In the early stages of the war, Sweden relied on a numerous army through conscription and the use of a Total Defence policy. In 1945, the Swedish army had been modernized from the use of World War I weapons to semi-automatic rifles and high-tech firearms such as the Carl Gustav. The infantry had also been equipped with a great deal of rocket launchers for anti-tank warfare, and the availability of artillery had increased drastically with the World War II build-up.

Name	Origin	Type	Versions	Quantity	In service	Notes
Pistol m/07	Sweden	Semi-automatic pistol	Pistol m/07	Unknown	1907-1980's	License-built FN Browning 1903.
Pistol m/39	Germany	Semi-automatic pistol	Pistol m/39	Unknown	1939-????	-
Pistol m/40	FinlandSweden	Semi-automatic pistol	Pistol m/40 Pistol m/40B	100,000	1940-1990s	License-built Lahti L-35, manufactured by Husqvarna
Kulsprutepistol m/37	FinlandSweden	Submachine gun	m/37 m/37-39 m/37-39F	35,000	1939-1980s	-
Kpist m/39	Germany	Submachine gun	Kpist m/39	Unknown	1940s-????	-
Kpist m/40	United States	Submachine gun	Kpist m/40	500	1940-1951	M1921 Thompson submachine gun.
Kpist m/45	Sweden	Submachine gun	m/45	300,000	1945–2007	-
Gevär m/96	Sweden	Bolt-action rifle	Karbin m/94 Gevär m/96 Gevär m/38 Gevär m/41 Gevär m/41B	127,000 535,000 88,000 5,300 5,300	1895-1980s	-
Gevär m/39	GermanySweden	Bolt-action rifle	m/39 m/40	5,000	1939-1970s	Modified German K98K's.
Automatgevär m/42	Sweden	Self-loading rifle	Ag m/42	30,000	1942-1960s	-
Kulsprutegevär m/21, m/21-37, m/37	United StatesSweden	Automatic rifle	m/21 m/37	Unknown	1921–1980	Modified M1918 Browning produced under license.
Kg m/39	Czechoslovakia	Automatic rifle	Kg m/39	Unknown	1939-????	-
Kg m/40	Sweden	Automatic rifle	Kg m/40	5,000	1940-????	-
Ksp m/14	Sweden	Medium machine gun	Ksp m/14 m/14-29	Unknown	1910s-1940s	Standard mount. Ksp m/36 mount.
Ksp m/36	Sweden	Medium machine gun	Ksp m/36	Unknown	1910s-????	Upgraded M1917 Browning produced under license.
Ksp m/42	United States; Sweden	Medium machine gun	Ksp m/42	1942–present	License-built, modified M1919.	
Pvkan m/39	Switzerland	Anti-tank rifle	Pvkan m/39	1939–????	-	
Pvg m/42	Sweden	Recoilless anti-tank rifle	Pvg m/42	1942–????	-	
Raketgevär 46	United States; Sweden	Recoilless anti-tank weapon	Raketgevär 46	Unknown	1940s-1960s	License-built M1 Bazooka

=== Armoured fighting vehicles ===
At the beginning of World War II, Sweden had a very low number of motorized vehicles, instead relying horses for transportation. When the war broke out in 1939, Sweden had one armoured division consisting of merely 13 light tanks, only 3 of which were considered to be modern (the remaining 10 had been in service since the 1920s). In 1945, the number of tanks serving the Swedish army had increased from 13 to more than 800.

Number of tanks pre-war: 14

Number of tanks in 1939: 29

Number of tanks in 1940: 38

Number of tanks in 1941: 135

Number of tanks in 1942: 373

Number of tanks in 1943: 544

Number of tanks in 1944: 795

Number of tanks in 1945: 795+

Name	Origin	Type	Versions	Quantity	In service	Notes
Pbil m/39	Sweden	Armoured car	Pbil m/39 Pbil m/40	15 30	1939-1956 1939-1960s	Version with Scania-Vabis engine Version with Volvo engine.
Pbil m/41	Sweden	Armoured car	Pbil m/41	5	1933–1980	More than 50 produced, most of them sold to other countries before and during the war.
Landsverk L-120	Sweden	Light tank	L-120	1	1937–1940	Prototype in active service but never mass-produced.
Strv m/21-29	Sweden	Light tank	m/21 m/21-29	10 5 former m/21	1922-1939	Standard version Upgraded with new engine and electrical starter.
Strv m/31	Sweden	Light tank	Strv m/31	3	1935–1940	Dug in as static bunkers for the Skåne Line
Strv m/37	Czechoslovakia; Sweden	Light tank	Strv m/37	48	1938–1953	License-built version of the AH-IV with Scania-Vabis engines.
L-60	Sweden	Light tank	Strv m/38 Strv m/39 Strv m/40L Strv m/40K	16 20 100 80	1938-1957 1940-1957 1941-1957 1943-1960	Landsverk L-60 In Swedish service.
Strv m/41	Czechoslovakia; Sweden	Light tank	Strv m/41S1 Strv m/41S2	116 104	1942-1950s	License-built, upgraded version of the LT. vz. 38.
Strv m/42	Sweden	Medium tank	Strv m/42 TM Strv m/42 TH Strv m/42 EH Strv m/42 TV	100 125+30 former TM 57 70 former TM	1943-???? 1943-1960 1944-1960 1944-1960	2 Scania-Vabis engines and electromagnetic gearboxes. 2 Scania-Vabis engines and hydraulic gearboxes. 1 Volve engine and a hydraulic gearbox. 2 Scania-Vabis engines and a mechanical gearbox.
Sav m/43	Sweden	Self-propelled artillery	Sav m/43	18	1944–1973	-
Tgbil m/42	Sweden	Armoured personnel carrier	Tgbil m/42 SKP Tgbil m/42 VKP	262 100	1944–2004	Manufactured by Scania-Vabis Manufactured by Volvo

=== Artillery ===
Sweden's artillery corps was made to specialize in mobility and warfare in the Swedish homeland terrain, which mostly consisted of thick forests and small, remote towns. Anti-aircraft warfare was considered important even before the war began, due to Sweden's small aircraft capacity in the 1930s. The Bofors 40 mm, a Swedish auto cannon, was exported to most warring countries in thousands of examples, making it the most common anti-aircraft weapon of the war.

Name	Origin	Type	Versions	Quantity	In service	Notes
Pvkan m/38	Sweden	Light anti-tank gun	m/34 m/38 m/38F	Unknown	1935-????	37mm Bofors AT gun.
Lvakan m/40	Sweden	Anti-aircraft autocannon	m/40	2,592	1940-????	20mm Bofors AA gun.
Lvakan m/36	Sweden	Anti-aircraft autocannon	m/36 m/36A m/36H m/36P m/38 m/39	924	1934–present	40mm Bofors L/60 AA gun.
Bofors 75 mm Model 1929	Sweden	Anti-aircraft gun	7.5 cm m/30 8 cm m/29	350	1930–present	Another 8 bought by Finland, 36 by the Netherlands and dozens by Hungary
Bofors 75 mm Model 1934	Sweden	Mountain gun	Bofors 75 mm	74	1934-????	-
10.5 cm kanon modell 1927	Sweden	Heavy field gun	Model 1927	4 in the coastal artillery, many more in the army	1927–1945	-
Kanon m/34	Sweden	Heavy field gun	m/34	68	1942-????	-
Bofors 12 cm m/14	Sweden	Towed howitzer	m/14	Unknown	????-????	-
Haubits m/40	Sweden	Towed howitzer	m/40	400 total	1940-????	-

In addition to these weapons, Sweden also possessed 9 unspecified heavy anti-aircraft guns with a caliber of 105 mm.

== Navy ==
The Swedish government saw a strong naval defense against a possible Soviet invasion as a high priority during World War II, and like with the rest of Sweden's military the Royal Navy lived through an enormous enhancement, ending up as the second-strongest naval power of the Baltic Sea after the Soviet Union.

=== Coastal defence ships ===
Class	Origin	Type	Names	Quantity	In service	Notes
Sverige class	Sweden	Coastal defence ship	HSwMS Drottning Victoria HSwMS Gustav V HSwMS Sverige	3	1915-1957	
Oscar II class	Sweden	Coastal defence ship	HSwMS Oscar II	1	1905-1950	
Äran class	Sweden	Coastal defence ship	HSwMS Manligheten HSwMS Tapperheten HSwMS Äran	3	1901-1950	

=== Cruisers ===
Class	Origin	Type	Names	Quantity	In service	Notes
Gotland class	Sweden	Seaplane cruiser	HSwMS Gotland	1	1933-1963	The Swedish response to an aircraft carrier, able to carry 8 Hawker Osprey
Tre Kronor class	Sweden	Cruiser	HSwMS Göta Lejon HSwMS Tre Kronor	2	1944-1984	The Göta Lejon was launched on 17 November 1945, 94 days after the surrender of Japan and the end of World War II
Fylgia class	Sweden	Armoured cruiser	HSwMS Fylgia	1	1905-1957	The HSwMS Fylgia is the smallest armoured cruiser ever to be launched
Clas Fleming class	Sweden	Mine cruiser	HSwMS Clas Fleming	1	1912-1960	
Örnen class	Sweden	Torpedo cruiser	HSwMS Örnen	1	1897-1947	Used as a cadet ship from 1926

=== Destroyers ===
Number of destroyers pre-war: 13

Number of destroyers in 1939: 14

Number of destroyers in 1940: 19

Number of destroyers in 1941: 20

Number of destroyers in 1942: 23

Number of destroyers in 1943: 27

Number of destroyers in 1944: 28

Number of destroyers in 1945: 28

Class	Origin	Type	Names	Quantity	In service	Notes
Göteborg class	Sweden	Destroyer	HSwMS Göteborg HSwMS Stockholm HSwMS Malmö HSwMS Karlskrona HSwMS Norrköping HSwMS Gävle	6	1935-1962 1936-1965 1938-1970 1939-1979 1940-1965 1941-1968	After World War II, all ships were rebuilt as frigates
Romulus class	(Kingdom of Italy) Italy	Destroyer/torpedo boat	HSwMS Romulus HSwMS Remus	2	1940-1958	Originally torpedo boats, rebuilt as destroyers for patrolling the Baltic Sea
Psilander class	(Kingdom of Italy) Italy	Destroyer	HSwMS Psilander HSwMS Puke	2	1940-1947	-
Vidar class	Sweden	Destroyer	HSwMS Wale HSwMS Ragnar HSwMS Sigurd HSwMS Vidar HSwMS Wale	4	1909-1947 1909-1947 1910-1947 1908-1940	-
Wrangel class	Sweden	Destroyer	HSwMS Wachtmeister HSwMS Wrangel	2	1917-1947	-
Ehrensköld class	Sweden	Destroyer	HSwMS Ehrensköld HSwMS Nordenskjöld	2	1926-1963	-
Klas class	Sweden	Destroyer	HSwMS Klas Horn HSwMS Klas Uggla	2	1932-1958 1932-1942	-
Mode class	Sweden	Destroyer	HSwMS Magne HSwMS Mjölner HSwMS Mode HSwMS Munin	4	1942-1966 1942-1966 1942-1970 1943-1968	-
Visby class	Sweden	Destroyer	HSwMS Hälsingborg HSwMS Kalmar HSwMS Sundsvall HSwMS Visby	4	1943-1978 1944-1978 1943-1982 1943-1982	-

=== Submarine chasers ===
Class	Origin	Type	Names	Quantity	In service	Notes
Jägaren class	Sweden	Submarine chaser	HSwMS Jägaren HSwMS Kaparen HSwMS Snapphanen HSwMS Väktaren	4	1932-1959 1933-1959 1934-1959 1934-1959	The ship type was called ”vedettbåt” in Swedish used in anti-submarine warfare and for mine clearance. Equipped with two 75 mm guns, anti-aircraft guns and depth charges.

=== Patrol boats ===
Class	Origin	Type	Notes
A class	Sweden	Patrol boat	The ship type was called ”vedettbåt” in Swedish. 40 boats where built for the coastal artillery. The boats where equipped with one 37 mm M/89 canon and had a crew of six men.

=== Mine warfare ships ===
Class	Origin	Type	Names	Quantity	In service	Notes
Älvsnabben class	Sweden	Mine layer	HSwMS Älvsnabben	1	1943-1982	

=== Auxiliary ships ===
Class	Origin	Type	Names	Quantity	In service	Notes
HSwMS Patricia	Sweden	Submarine tender	HSwMS Patricia	1	1940-1971	Passenger ship purchased by the Swedish navy and converted to a submarine tender. Transported Swedish crew members for sailing the four Italian destroyers purchased by the Swedish navy home to Sweden.
HSwMS Dristigheten	Sweden	Seaplane tender	HSwMS Dristigheten	1	1900-1947	An improved Oden-class coastal defence ship and sole member of her class. Converted to a depot ship/seaplane tender in 1927
HSwMS Jacob Bagge	Sweden	Training ship	HSwMS Jacob Bagge	1	1898-1947	Originally an Örnen-class torpedo cruiser. Converted to a seaplane tender (1927-1935) then to a training ship from 1941 and onwards.
Hjkr 3 Drottning Victoria	Sweden	Support cruiser	Hjkr 3 Drottning Victoria	1	1939-1945	Passenger liner called in to service by the Royal Swedish Navy. Converted to a minelaying cruiser as there was a shortage of minelayers in 1939 because minelayer HSwMS Clas Fleming was undergoing modernization.
Hjkr 4 Waria	Sweden	Support cruiser	Hjkr 4 Waria	1	1939-1945	Civilian cargo ship called in to service by the Royal Swedish Navy. Waria was called in to service due to the Soviet Union's attack on Finland. Rebuilt at Finnboda shipyard and completed on April 5, 1940 to suit her new role. She was used mainly as an escort ship. She was returned to Sveabolaget for civil duties in 1945.
Hjkr 5 Warun	Sweden	Support cruiser	Hjkr 5 Warun	1	1939-1945	Civilian cargo ship called in to service by the Royal Swedish Navy. Warun was called into service because of the outbreak of the Finnish Winter War on November 30. In 1939 she was rebuilt at Finnboda Shipyard to suit her new role in the navy. The ship was mainly used in escort duties. She was returned to Sveabolaget for civil duties in 1945.
Hjkr 10 Fidra	Sweden	Support cruiser	Hjkr 10 Fidra	1	1939-1945	Civilian cargo ship called in to service by the Royal Swedish Navy. Fidra was rebuilt at Götaverken shipyards in Gothenburg to suit her new role and was completed on April 2, 1940. She replaced the auxiliary cruiser Drottning Viktoria (Hjkr 3) as a minelayer. She was returned to Sveabolaget in for civil duties 1945.
Hjkr 14 Wiros	Sweden	Support cruiser	Hjkr 14 Wiros	1	1939-1945	Civilian cargo ship called in to service by the Royal Swedish Navy. Wiros was called in as an auxiliary cannon boat due to the outbreak of World War II in September 1939 and was rebuilt at Gävle shipyard. During the rebuilding she was classified as an auxiliary cruiser and was mainly used for escort duties. She was returned to Sveabolaget for civil duties in 1945.

== Air force ==
Sweden's air force at the beginning of World War II was relatively small and lacked modern radar systems, engines, or weaponry. This changed during the build-up in the 1940s, though, eventually providing Sweden with an aircraft storage that was both numerous and of high quality, in preparation for the Cold War.

=== Fighter aircraft ===
Just as the rest of the Swedish Armed Forces, the number of fighter aircraft increased drastically from 98 before the war to almost 600 in 1945. 239 additional aircraft were manufactured immediately after the war.

Number of fighters pre-war: 98

Number of fighters in 1939: 158

Number of fighters in 1940: 290

Number of fighters in 1941: 290

Number of fighters in 1942: 485

Number of fighters in 1943: 485

Number of fighters in 1944: 485

Number of fighters in 1945: 593

Number of fighters post-war: 832

Name	Origin	Type	Versions	Quantity	In service	Notes
J 3	Netherlands	Biplane fighter aircraft	J 3B	7	1930-1945	Another 8 aircraft were in use prior to the war
J 6	Sweden	Biplane fighter aircraft	J 6 J 6A J 6B	7 3 7	1929–1941	3 donated to Finland for the Winter War
J 7	United Kingdom	Biplane reconnaissance aircraft	J 7	11	1930–1940	2 donated to Finland for the Winter War
J 8	United Kingdom; Sweden	Biplane reconnaissance aircraft	J 8 J 8A	37 18	1937-1942 1938-1945	Some used in Finland
J 9	United States	Fighter aircraft	J 9	60	1940–1951	Sweden's first monoplane aircraft
J 11	(Kingdom of Italy) Italy	Biplane fighter aircraft	J 11	72	1940–1946	-
J 20	(Kingdom of Italy) Italy	Fighter aircraft	J 12	60	1939–1945	-
J 21	Sweden	Fighter and attack aircraft	J 21A-1	54	1945–1949	Another 128 aircraft were built immediately after the war
J 22	Sweden	Fighter aircraft	J 22A J 22B	143 55	1942–1952	Numbers may not be correct for the World War II era; some may have been built in 1946
J 26	United States	Fighter aircraft	P-51B P-51D	2 52	1945–1954	Originally P-51 Mustang, another 111 aircraft purchased immediately after the war

=== Bomber aircraft ===
During World War II the Swedish government maintained a neutral (alternatively, defensive) stance and thus saw no priority in adding offensive aircraft to the air force. Despite this, a fairly large number of bombers and ground-attack aircraft served in the Swedish air force during World War II and after, possibly for intimidation purposes - in fact, after 1940, Sweden had more bombers than fighter aircraft. These offensive aircraft may have been meant to attack Soviet naval bases in the Baltic Sea, and some of the later designs could even reach Moscow with full payload.

Number of bombers pre-war: 88

Number of bombers in 1939: 116

Number of bombers in 1940: 276

Number of bombers in 1941: 346

Number of bombers in 1942: 534

Number of bombers in 1943: 743

Number of bombers in 1944: 775

Number of bombers in 1945: 879

Name	Origin	Type	Versions	Quantity	In service	Notes
B 3	(Nazi Germany) Germany	Bomber aircraft	B 3 B 3A B 3B B 3C B 3D	3 35 2 16 16	1936-1948 1937-1958 1937-1958 1939-1944 1941-1958	72 total
B 4	United Kingdom	Biplane bomber	B 4 B 4A	3 42	1937–1947	5 used in the Winter War
B 5	United States	Ground attack aircraft	B 5A B 5B B 5C	1 64 38	1938-1942 1940-1950 1941-1950	103 total
B 6	United States; Sweden	Ground attack aircraft	B 6	2	1940-1953	More were ordered but never entered service
B 16	(Kingdom of Italy) Italy; Sweden	Light bomber Reconnaissance aircraft Reconnaissance aircraft Torpedo bomber Light transport	B 16A S 16A S 16B T 16A Tp 16A	30 66 14 14 2	1940-1943 1940-1945 1942-1945 1941-1942 1941-1946	126 total
Saab 17	Sweden	Bomber and reconnaissance aircraft	B 17 B 17B B 17C S 17BL S 17BS	132 54 77 64 56	1943-1948 1942-1945 1943-1947 1942-1949 1942-1949	383 total
Saab 18	Sweden	Bomber and reconnaissance aircraft	B 18A B 18B	62 120	1944-1947 1945-1958	-
T 1	(Nazi Germany) Germany; Sweden	Torpedo bomber	T 1	2	1928–1939	-
T 2	(Nazi Germany) Germany	Torpedo bomber seaplane	T 2	12	1939–1948	-

=== Auxiliary aircraft ===
Name	Origin	Type	Versions	Quantity	In service	Notes
Trp 1	(Weimar Republic) Germany	Small passenger transport aircraft	Trp 1	3	1928-1946	The world's first all-metal transport aircraft
Trp 2	(Weimar Republic) Germany	Passenger and transport aircraft	Trp 2 Trp 2A	0 2	1933-1945	One Trp 2 was in use until 1935
Trp 3	United Kingdom	Light transport aircraft	Trp 3	1	1936-1942	-
Trp 4	United States	Trainer and utility aircraft	Trp 4	1	1940-1953	-
Tp 5	(Nazi Germany) Germany	Transport aircraft	Tp 5	5	1940-1945	-
Tp 6	United States	STOL aircraft	Tp 6	1	1940-1941	-
Tp 7	United Kingdom	Transport and trainer aircraft	Tp 7	1	1940-1944	Still preserved in flying condition
Tp 8	United States	Biplane transport aircraft	Tp 8 Tp 8A	3 1	1940-????	-
Tp 9	(Nazi Germany) Germany	Bomber, reconnaissance and airliner	Tp 9	1	1940-????	-
Tp 10	Netherlands	Airliner	Tp 10	1	1942-1944	-
Tp 11	Poland	Reconnaissance aircraft	Tp 11	1	1939-1951	-
Tp 12	Sweden	Reconnaissance aircraft	GV 38	6	1941-1945	-

== See also ==
- List of equipment of the Swedish Armed Forces
- Military equipment of Sweden during the Cold War

== Sources and further reading ==
- http://www.beredskapstid.se/cms/index.php?option=com_frontpage&Itemid=76
- https://web.archive.org/web/20120109074948/http://www.sphf.se/Axvall/samling.htm
- http://www2.landskrona.se/kultur/landsverk/militart/pansarstart.html
- http://ww2db.com/country/sweden
