= Military equipment of Sweden during the Cold War =

Sweden played a role of major importance during the Cold War, despite not officially participating. Sweden's location made it an ideal base of operations for both the Soviet Union and the United States, thus Sweden maintained a sizable military and extensive domestic arms industry, especially for a nation of its size and population.

== Army ==
=== Personal equipment ===
Name	Image	Origin	Type	Quantity	Years in service	Notes
Uniforms and Gears
m/1952	M/1952 uniform jacket shown in museum. M/1952 uniform peaked cap shown in museum.	Sweden	Service dress uniform	Unknown	1952-????	
m/1954		Sweden	Guard duty uniform	Unknown	1954-????	Kit consisted of a white helmet, belt, gloves and ankle gaiters. "White outfit m/1954" was a collective term for the kit. It was used by the army together with uniform m/1952 and later to uniform m/1960 for guard duty.
m/1958	Field uniform m/1958. (From the Army Museum's collections).	Sweden	Combat uniform	Unknown	1958-????	Produced in parallel with m/1959 uniform. Intended for winter use.
m/1959	Soldier in m/1959 uniform with automatkarbin 4.	Sweden	Combat uniform	Unknown	1958-????	Intended for summer use.
Combat Helmets
m/1921	Swedish soldier with m/1921 helmet and m/1923 gas mask.	Sweden	Steel helmet	Unknown	1921-????	
m/1926	M/1926 helmet.	Sweden	Steel helmet	Unknown	1926-????	Used primarily by the Swedish Civil Defense.
m/1937	M/1937 helmet.	Sweden	Steel helmet	Unknown	1937-1990s	The m/1937 would see modernization in 1965, with an updated liner.
m/1990	M/1990 helmet with an M90 camouflage pattern cover.	Sweden	Kevlar helmet	Unknown	1990s-????	Two versions were made that were virtually identical but had different inner linings.

=== Small arms ===
Name	Origin	Type	Versions	Quantity	Years in service	Notes
Pistol m/39	Germany	Semi-automatic pistol	Pistol m/38	1,500	1939-????	Walther-built Model HP
Pistol m/40	Finland; Sweden	Semi-automatic pistol	Pistol m/40 Pistol m/40B	100,000	1940-1990s	License-built Lahti L-35, manufactured by Husqvarna
Pistol 88	Austria; Sweden	Semi-automatic pistol	Glock 17 (pist 88) Glock 19 (pist 88B)	Unknown	1980s-present	Modern standard-issue sidearm
Kulsprutepistol m/37	Finland; Sweden	Submachine gun	Kpist m/37 kpist m37-39	35,000	1939-1980s	9 mm Browning Long 9 mm Parabellum
Kulsprutepistol m/39	Germany; Sweden	Submachine gun	M39	Unknown	1940s-????	-
MP 18	German Empire	Submachine gun	MP 18	Unknown	1920s-????	-
Kpist m/45	Sweden	Submachine gun	M/45 M/45B M/45C M/45BE M/45BET M/45S	Unknown	1945–2007	Standard version Minor improvements Comes equipped with a bayonet mount Selective-fire version, used by police Comes equipped with a tear gas launcher Uses a 50-round coffin magazine
Gevär m/96	Sweden	Bolt-action rifle	M/1894 M/1896 M/1938 M/1941 M/1941B	127,000 535,000 88,000 5,300 5,300	1895-1980s	-
Gevär m/39 gevär m/40	Germany; Sweden	Bolt-action anti-tank rifle	Kar 98k	5,000	1939-1970s	Rechambered from the original 8 × 57 IS to 8×63mm patron m/32
Automatgevär m/42	Sweden	Self-loading rifle	Ag m/42A Ag m/42B	Unknown	1942–1965	-
Automatkarbin 4	Germany; Sweden	Battle rifle	AK4 AK4B AK4OR	Unknown	1965–present	Standard version Equipped with Aimpoint red dot sight Equipped with 4×24 telescopic sight
Automatkarbin 5	Sweden	Assault rifle Designated marksman rifle Assault rifle Assault rifle Carbine Police combat rifle	FFV Ak 5 FFV Ak 5B Bofors Ak 5C Bofors Ak 5CF Bofors Ak 5D CGA5P	Unknown Unknown Unknown 40,000 Unknown Unknown	1986–present	Modern standard-issue assault rifle 4× tritium sight Multiple modifications by Bofors Multiple modifications by Bofors Lightweight carbine version Semi-automatic version with improved accuracy
Kulsprutegevär m/21 Kg m/37, kg m/21-37	United States/Belgium; Sweden	Automatic rifle	Model 1919	Unknown	1921–1980	-
Kulsprutegevär m/40	Sweden	Automatic rifle	KG m/40	5,000	1940-????	-
Kulspruta m/14	Sweden	Medium machine gun	Kulspruta m/14	Unknown	1910s-1940s	-
Kulspruta m/58	Belgium; Sweden	General-purpose machine gun	Ksp 58 Ksp 58B Ksp 58 Strv	Unknown	1958–present 1972–present 1958-1990s	Standard version Rechambered to 7.62×51mm NATO Equipped for the Strv 103
Kulspruta 90	Belgium; Sweden	Light machine gun	Ksp 90 Ksp 90B	Unknown	1980s-present	-
Kulspruta 95	Soviet Union; Sweden	Squad automatic weapon	Ksp 95	Unknown	1980s-present	-
Kulspruta m/36	United States; Sweden	Medium machine gun	Ksp m/36	Unknown	1940s-present	-
Kulspruta m/39	United States; Sweden	Medium machine gun	Ksp m/39	Unknown	1940s-present	-
Tung Kulspruta 12,7 mm	United States	Heavy machine gun	Tksp 12,7 mm	Unknown	1940s-present	-
Granatspruta40 mm	United States	Automatic grenade launcher	Grsp 40 mm	Unknown	1970s-present	-
M203	United States	Grenade launcher	M203	Unknown	1970s-present	-
Granatgevär m/48	Sweden	Multirole recoilless rifle	Grg m/48	Unknown	1948–present	Then standard-issue rocket launcher/anti-tank weapon
Raketgevär 46	United States; Sweden	Recoilless anti-tank weapon	Raketgevär 46	Unknown	1940s-1960s	-
Pansarskott m/68	Sweden	Recoilless anti-tank weapon	Pskott m/68	Unknown	1968-1980s	-
Robotsystem 69	United States; Sweden	Man-portable air-defence system	RBS 69	Unknown	1968-1990s	-
Robotsystem	Sweden	Man-portable air-defence system	RBS 70	Unknown	1977–present	-

=== Armored fighting vehicles ===
The Swedish army during the Cold War possessed more or less 24,000 ground vehicles, including 2,354 tanks, 1,257 armored fighting vehicles, and up to 20,000 utility vehicles.

Vehicle	Origin	Type	Versions	Quantity	Years in service	Notes
Pltgb 903	Sweden	4×4 infantry truck 4×4 infantry truck 4×4 communications vehicle 4×4 anti-tank vehicle ATGM carrier Firefighting vehicle	Pltgb 903 Pltgb 903B Raptgb 9033 Pvpjtgb 9031 Pvrbtgb 9032 Brtgb 921	Thousands	1959-1977	- - - Equipped with the Pvpj 1110 90mm recoilless gun Equipped with the Robot 53 ATGM -
Terrängbil 11	Sweden	4×4 infantry truck 4×4 anti-tank vehicle 6×6 communications vehicle 6×6 infantry truck 6×6 communications vehicle 6×6 ambulance 6×6 artillery spotter 6×6 armored personnel carrier MANPADS carrier	Tgb 11 Tgb 1111 Tgb 1112 Tgb 13 Tgb 1313 Tgb 1314 Tgb 1321 Tgb 21 Tgb 22	Roughly 6,500	1967–present	- Equipped with the Pvpj 1110 90mm recoilless gun - - - - - - Equipped with the RBS 70
Bv 202	Sweden	Tracked all-terrain vehicle		5,000	1964–present	-
Bv 206	Sweden	All-terrain carrier Military ambulance Military firefighting apparatus Improved intelligence vehicle Mobile military radio transmitter	Bv 206 Bv 206A Bv 206F Bv 2064 Bv2068	4,500	1980-present	-
Pbil m/39	Sweden	Armoured car	Pbil m/39 Pbil m/40	15 30	1939-1956 1939-1960s	Standard version Powered by a Volvo engine
Pbil m/41	Sweden	Armoured car	L-180	5	1933–1980	-
Tgbil m/42 KP	Sweden	Armored personnel carrier	SKP VKP	262 100	1944–2004	Manufactured by Scania-Vabis Manufactured by Volvo
Pbv 301	Sweden	Armored personnel carrier		185	1961–1971	-
Pbv 302	Sweden	Armored personnel carrier		400+	1965–2014	-
Patria Pasi	Finland	Armored personnel carrier Command vehicle Armored personnel carrier	XA-180S XA-202S XA-203S	200	1980s–present	- - Armed with a 20mm auto cannon
Ikv 91	Sweden	Infantry support vehicle	Ikv 91 Ikv 105	212	1975–2002	- Prototype with a 105mm anti-tank gun
Strv m/37	Czechoslovakia; Sweden	Tankette	Strv m/37	48	1938–1953	License-built version of the AH-IV
Strv L-60	Sweden	Light tank	Strv m/38 Strv m/39 Strv m/40 Strv m/40L Strv m/40K	15 20 ? 100 80	1939-???? 1940-???? ????-???? 1941-???? 1944-????	-
Strv m/41	Czechoslovakia; Sweden	Medium tank	Strv m/41	238	1942-1950s	License-built, slightly upgraded version of the Panzer 38(t)
Strv m/42	Sweden	Medium tank	Lago I (Strv m/42) Lago II (Strv m/42 TM) Lago III (Strv m/42 TH) Lago IV (Strv m/42 EH)	342 total	1943-???? 1943-???? 1944-???? 1944-????	Standard version Two engines and electromagnetic gearbox Two engines and two hydraulic gearboxes One engine and a hydraulic gearbox
Strv 74	Sweden	Medium tank	Strv 74 H Strv 74 V	659	1958-1984	-
Centurion tank	United Kingdom	Main battle tank	Strv 81 Strv 101 Strv 101R Strv 102 Strv 102R Strv 104	350 total	1953-1992	
Strv 103	Sweden	Main battle tank	Strv 103A Strv 103B Strv 103C Strv 103D	290	1967-1997 1970s-1997 1986-1997 1990s	Standard version Enhanced engine Enhanced engine and laser rangefinder Modernized prototype, only 1 built

=== Artillery and mortars ===
Name	Origin	Type	Versions	Quantity	Years in service	Notes
M/41D	Sweden	Heavy mortar		219	1941–present	120mm caliber mortar
Haubits FH77	Sweden	Towed howitzer	FH77 A FH77 B	220	1978-2006	
PvBv 2062	Sweden	Mobile anti-tank gun		Unknown	1980s-present	Equipped with Pvpj 1110 90mm recoilless gun
PvBv 2063	Sweden	ATGM carrier		Unknown	1980s-present	Equipped with Rbs 55 or Rbs 56
Bkan 1	Sweden	Self-propelled artillery	Bkan 1A Bkan 1C	26	1967-2003	-
Bofors 40 mm	Sweden	Anti-aircraft autocannon	Bofors L/60 Bofors L/70	Unknown	1934–present	-
MIM-23 Hawk	United States	Surface-to-air missile	RBS 77 RBS 97	8 launchers	1960s-present	Unknown number of missiles, at least 24
Lvrbv 701	Sweden	MANPADS carrier		49	1980s-2000	Equipped with RBS 70

== Coastal defence ==
The eastern coast of Sweden, along a length of more than 1500 kilometres, probably had the most powerful coastal defence system in the world. The system consisted of coastal artillery, submarines, battleships and aircraft. No less than 90 heavy cannons (typically 7.5 cm cannons) with large underground facilities were strategically located along the coast, together with a large number of bunkers and pillboxes.

== Navy ==
The Swedish navy possessed a total of 129 ships between 1945 and 1991.

=== Seaplane cruisers ===
Ship	Origin	Type	Names	Quantity	Years in service	Notes
Gotland class	Sweden	Seaplane cruiser	HSwMS Gotland	1	1933-1963	Could carry 8 aircraft
Dristigheten class	Sweden	Seaplane cruiser	HSwMS Dristigheten	1	1901-1947	Could carry 2 aircraft

=== Cruisers ===
Sweden possessed four cruisers throughout the Cold War.

Ship	Origin	Type	Names	Quantity	Years in service	Notes
Clas Fleming class	Sweden	Mine cruiser	HSwMS Clas Fleming	1	1912-1960	-
Fylgia class	Sweden	Armored cruiser	HSwMS Fylgia	1	1907-1957	-
Tre Kronor class	Sweden	Cruiser	HSwMS Tre Kronor HSwMS Göta Lejon	2	1944-1964 1945-1971	-

=== Destroyers ===
Sweden had a total of 35 destroyer-class vessels throughout the Cold War, most of them World War II models. As time went on, Sweden begun to put less effort in keeping large surface combatants and instead increasingly relied on patrol boats, fast attack craft, coastal artillery and air superiority. However this approach (especially the overreliance on lighter surface combatants) was somewhat discredited by the early 1980s. Attempts were then made to move back towards heavier more capable surface combatants (e.g. the Ytstridsfartyg Större [Surface Combatant Large] program), but this was ultimately curtailed by the sudden end to the Cold War. (Note: Though the 'Större' program was then merged with the Ytstridsfartyg Mindre [Surface Combatant Small] program to form the YS2000 (Surface Combatant 2000) program that would later result in the Visby-class corvette.)

Destroyers in 1945: 28
Destroyers in 1950: 21
Destroyers in 1960: 24
Destroyers in 1970: 17
Destroyers in 1980: 13
Destroyers in 1991: 0

Ship	Origin	Type	Names	Quantity	Years in service	Notes
Ehrensköld class	Sweden	Destroyer	HSwMS Ehrensköld HSwMS Nordenskjöld	2	1927-1963	-
Göteborg class	Sweden	Destroyer	HSwMS Göteborg HSwMS Stockholm HSwMS Malmö HSwMS Karlskrona HSwMS Norrköping HSwMS Gävle	6	1936-1962 1937-1965 1939-1970 1940-1979 1941-1965 1941-1968	-
Halland class	Sweden	Destroyer	HSwMS Halland HSwMS Småland	2	1955-1985 1956-1979	-
Hugin class	Sweden	Destroyer	HSwMS Hugin HSwMS Munin	2	1911-1947 1911-1946	-
Klas class	Sweden	Destroyer	HSwMS Klas Horn	1	1932-1958	-
Mode class	Sweden	Destroyer	HSwMS Magne HSwMS Magne HSwMS Munin HSwMS Mjölner	4	1942-1966 1942-1970 1942-1968 1942-1966	All converted to frigates in 1953/1957
Romulus class	Italy; Sweden	Destroyer	HSwMS Romulus HSwMS Remus	2	1934-1958 1934-1958	-
Psilander class	Italy; Sweden	Destroyer	HSwMS Psilander HSwMS Puke	2	1926-1947 1926-1947	-
Vidar class	Sweden	Destroyer	HSwMS Ragnar HSwMS Sigurd HSwMS Vidar	3	1910-1947	-
Visby class	Sweden	Destroyer	HSwMS Hälsingborg HSwMS Kalmar HSwMS Sundsvall HSwMS Visby	4	1942-1982	-
Wrangel class	Sweden	Destroyer	HSwMS Wrangel HSwMS Wachtmeister	2	1918-1947	-
Öland class	Sweden	Destroyer	HSwMS Uppland HSwMS Öland	2	1947-1979	-
Östergötland class	Sweden	Destroyer	HSwMS Gästrikland HSwMS Hälsingland HSwMS Södermanland HSwMS Östergötland	4	1955-1982	-

=== Coastal defense ships ===
The Swedish navy maintained 7 coastal defense ships after World War II, though some were taken out of service shortly after.

- Oscar II-class coastal defense ship (1)
  - HSwMS Oscar II (1905-1950)
- Sverige-class coastal defence ship (3)
  - HSwMS Drottning Victoria (1921-1957)
  - HSwMS Gustav V (1922-1957)
  - HSwMS Sverige (1915-1953)
- Äran-class coastal defence ship (3)
  - HSwMS Manligheten (1904-1950)
  - HSwMS Tapperheten (1903-1947)
  - HSwMS Äran (1902-1947)

=== Corvettes ===
The Swedish navy had as few as six corvettes in service during the Cold War, relying on larger vessels during this time.

- Göteborg-class corvette (4)
  - HSwMS Gävle (1990–present)
  - HSwMS Göteborg (1990–present)
  - HSwMS Kalmar (1990–present)
  - HSwMS Sundsvall (1991–present)
- Stockholm-class corvette (2)
  - HSwMS Malmö (1985–present)
  - HSwMS Stockholm (1984–present)

=== Mine warfare vessels ===
Sweden possessed 19 mine warfare vessels throughout the time period 1945–1991.

- HSwMS Alnösund minelayer
- HSwMS Arkösund minelayer
- HSwMS Barösund minelayer
- HSwMS Grundsund minelayer
- HSwMS Furusund minelayer
- HSwMS Fårösund minelayer
- HSwMS Kalmarsund minelayer
- HSwMS Kalvsund minelayer
- HSwMS Skramsösund minelayer
- HSwMS Älvsborg minelayer
- HSwMS Älvsnabben minelayer
- HSwMS Öresund minelayer
- Landsort-class mine countermeasures vessel (7)
  - HSwMS Arholma (1984-2010)
  - HSwMS Koster (1986–present)
  - HSwMS Kullen (1986–present)
  - HSwMS Landsort (1982–present)
  - HSwMS Ulvön (1980s-present)
  - HSwMS Ven (1980s-present)
  - HSwMS Vinga (1980s-present)

=== Patrol boats ===
Seventeen patrol boats were in service in the Royal Swedish Navy between 1945 and 1991.

- HSwMS Hugin
- HSwMS Jägaren
- HSwMS Kaparen
- HSwMS Magne
- HSwMS Mjölner
- HSwMS Mode
- HSwMS Munin
- HSwMS Mysing
- HSwMS Snapphanen
- HSwMS Spejaren
- HSwMS Starkodder
- HSwMS Styrbjörn
- HSwMS Tirfing
- HSwMS Tordön
- HSwMS Vale
- HSwMS Vidar
- HSwMS Väktaren

=== Torpedo boats ===
Sweden had 12 torpedo boats during the Cold War.

- Perseus-class torpedo boat (1)
  - HSwMS Perseus
- Plejad-class torpedo boat (1953) (11)
  - HSwMS Alderbaran
  - HSwMS Altair
  - HSwMS Antares
  - HSwMS Arcturus
  - HSwMS Argo
  - HSwMS Astrea
  - HSwMS Plejad
  - HSwMS Polaris
  - HSwMS Pollux
  - HSwMS Regulus
  - HSwMS Rigel

=== Submarines ===
Sweden had a total of 26 submarines throughout the Cold War.

- Draken-class submarine (5)
- Hajen class (6)
  - HSwMS Bävern
  - HSwMS Hajen
  - HSwMS Illern
  - HSwMS Sälen
  - HSwMS Uttern
  - HSwMS Valen
- Neptun-class submarine (3)
- Näcken-class submarine (3)
  - HSwMS Najad
  - HSwMS Neptun
  - HSwMS Näcken
- Sjöormen-class submarine (5)
  - HSwMS Sjöbjörnen
  - HSwMS Sjöhunden
  - HSwMS Sjöhästen
  - HSwMS Sjölejonet
  - HSwMS Sjöormen
- Västergötland-class submarine (4)
  - HSwMS Helsingland
  - HSwMS Södermanland
  - HSwMS Västergötland
  - HSwMS Östergötland

=== Auxiliary vessels ===
- HSwMS Arkösund minelayer
- HSwMS Belos submarine salvage vessel
- HSwMS Carlskrona minelayer
- HSwMS Trossö ice-strengthened patrol craft
- HSwMS Visborg command/auxiliary ship
- Landing Craft L-50 mechanized landing craft (5)

== Air force ==
=== Fighter aircraft ===
Name	Origin	Type	Versions	Quantity	In service	Notes
J 9	United States; Sweden	Fighter aircraft	J 9	60	1940–1951	Sweden's first monoplane aircraft
J 11	(Kingdom of Italy) Italy; Sweden	Biplane fighter aircraft	J 11	72	1940–1946	-
J 21	Sweden	Fighter aircraft Fighter aircraft Attack aircraft Experimental aircraft	J 21A-1 J 21A-2 J21A-3 J 21B	54 124 132 0	1945–1949 1946-1954 1947-1954 1940s	-
J 21R	Sweden	Fighter and attack aircraft	J 21R	64	1945–1956	Sweden's first indigenous jet fighter
J 22	Sweden	Fighter aircraft	J 22A J 22B	143 55	1942–1952	Numbers may not be correct for the World War II era; some may have been built in 1946
J 26	United States	Fighter aircraft	P-51B P-51D	2 52	1945–1954	Originally P-51 Mustang, another 111 aircraft purchased immediately after the war
J 28	United Kingdom	Fighter aircraft	J 28A J 28B J 28C	70 310 57	1946-1956	1st generation jet fighter; 437 total
Saab 29 Tunnan	Sweden	Experimental aircraft Fighter aircraft Fighter aircraft Attack aircraft Reconnaissance aircraft Experimental aircraft Fighter aircraft Fighter aircraft	J 29 J 29A J 29B A 29B S 29C J 29D J 29D J 29F	4 224 332 ? 76 1 29 308	1949-1976	1st generation jet fighter; 666+ total
S 31	United Kingdom	Fighter and reconnaissance aircraft	S 31	50	1946-1950s	-
Saab 32 Lansen	Sweden	Attack aircraft All-weather fighter Maritime reconnaissance aircraft Target tug aircraft ECM aircraft Fighter aircraft Fighter aircraft	A 32A J 32B S 32C J 32D J 32E J 32AD J 32U	287 120 45 6 14 0 0	1956-1997	452 built
J 34	United Kingdom	Fighter and attack aircraft	J 34	120	1946-1956	2nd generation jet fighter
Saab 35 Draken	Sweden	Fighter aircraft Fighter aircraft Trainer aircraft Fighter aircraft Reconnaissance aircraft Fighter aircraft Fighter aircraft	J 35A J 35B SK 35C J 35D S 35E J 35F J 35J	90 73 25 120 60 230 66	1955-1998	651 built
Saab 37 Viggen	Sweden	Attack aircraft -"- Trainer aircraft -"- Reconnaissance aircraft -"- Fighter aircraft -"- -"- -"-	AJ 37 AJS 37 SK 37 SK 37E SF 37 SH 37 JA 37 JA 37C JA 37D JA 37DI	329 total	1971-2005	Some air combat capability Upgraded AJ, with recce pod available Schooling aircraft, trainer Upgraded SK, EW capability added Photo-Reconnaissance Radar-based sea reconnaissance Fighter with limited ground attack capability. -"- -"- Digital instrumentation for JAS 39 development

=== Bomber aircraft ===
- Saab 17 bomber & reconnaissance aircraft - 323
- Saab 18 twin-engine bomber - 245

=== Trainers ===
- Saab 105 trainer aircraft - 80

=== Transport aircraft ===
- Lockheed C-130 - 8

=== Helicopters ===
- Piasecki Hkp 1 transport helicopter - 14
- Bell Hkp 3 utility helicopter - 29
- Boeing-Vertol Hkp 4 transport helicopter - 21
- Eurocopter Hkp 10 utility helicopter - 12

== Resource management ==
The need for safe storage of large quantities of oil to support anticipated use of military equipment led to creative solutions, in particular the use of undressed rock chambers, the full environmental effects of which have not yet been ascertained.

== See also ==
- List of military equipment of Sweden
- Military equipment of Sweden during World War II
- Military on Gotland

== Sources and further reading ==
- http://www.bismarck-class.dk/other_craft_involved/swedish_ship_involved/swedish_ship_involved.html
- https://web.archive.org/web/20100813230614/http://www.f10kamratforening.se/Kamrat/Word/?page_id=407
- http://www.globalaircraft.org/planes/saab_37_viggen.pl
- http://www.militaryfactory.com/armor/detail.asp?armor_id=104
- https://web.archive.org/web/20100827173632/http://www.sfhm.se/templates/pages/FlygStandardPage____1807.aspx?epslanguage=EN
- https://web.archive.org/web/20120108040052/http://www.sphf.se/Axvall/74.htm
