= MS Skaubryn =

Norwegian passenger ship (1950–1958)

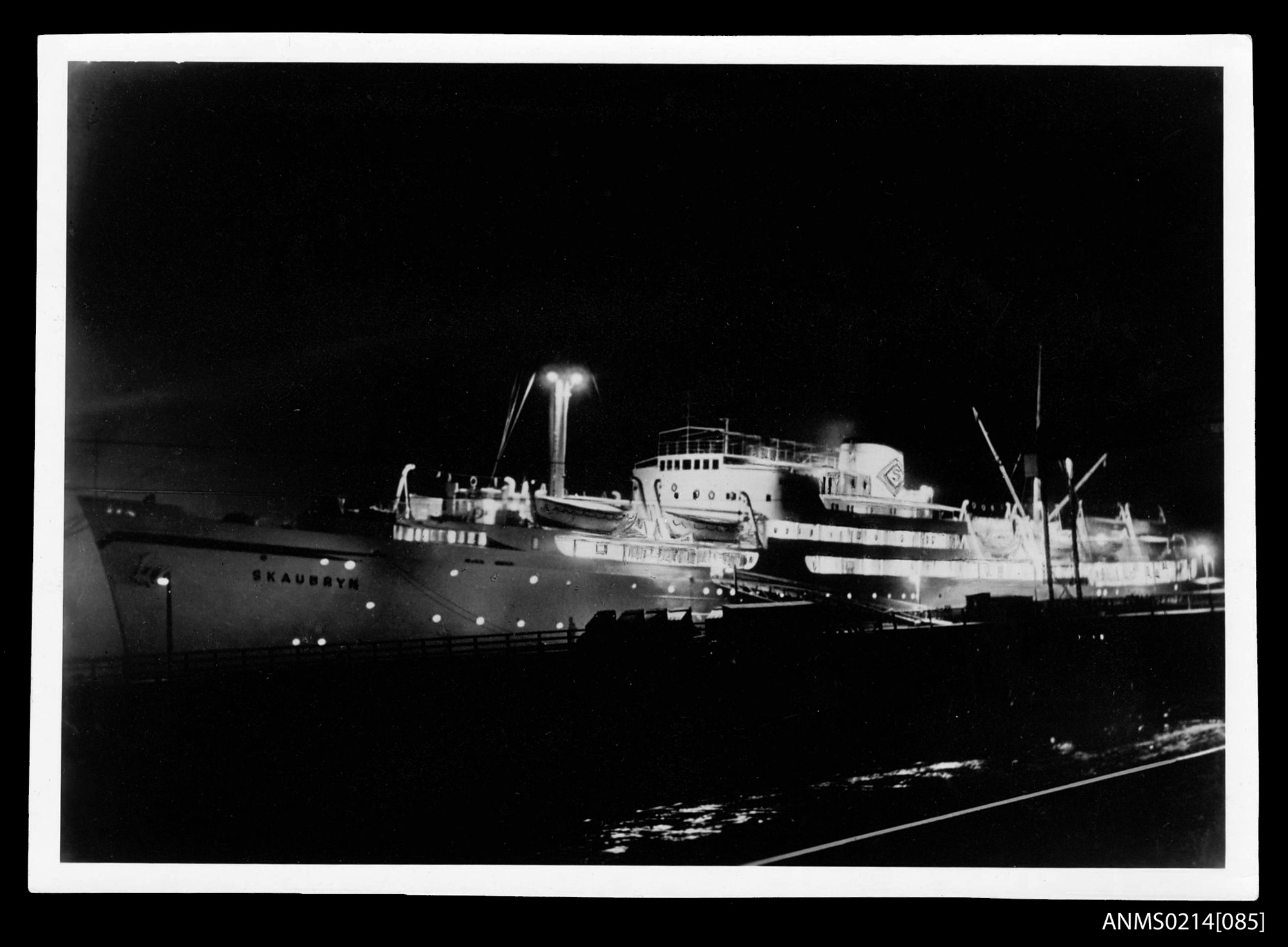

History
- Name: MS Skaubryn
- Operator: Skaugen Line
- Port of registry: Oslo
- Builder: Öresundsvarvet, Landskrona, Sweden
- Launched: 7 October 1950
- Completed: 22 February 1951
- Maiden voyage: 24 February 1951
- Homeport: Oslo
- Identification: IMO 5607733
- Fate: Sank after fire, 6 April 1958

General characteristics
- Type: Passenger liner
- Tonnage: 9,786 gross register tons (GRT)
- Length: 458 ft (140 m)
- Beam: 57 ft (17 m)
- Propulsion: Götaverken diesel engines, 1 shaft
- Speed: 16 knots (30 km/h; 18 mph)
- Capacity: 16 first class and 1,205 tourist class passengers

MS Skaubryn was a Norwegian passenger ship launched in 1950, which sailed between Europe and Australia. She sank in the Indian Ocean in April 1958, after a fire.

== Construction and design ==
Owned by Isak Skaugen, Skaubryn was first intended to be a shelter deck cargo ship for one of his companies, Eikland. She was built by the Öresundsvarvet Shipbuilding Company in Landskrona, Sweden, and launched on October 7, 1950. Whilst being fitted out, Skaugen decided to have her completed as an emigrant liner, and she was transferred to the Howaldtswerke shipyard for completion as a passenger liner. When completed she offered tourist class accommodation for 1,205 passengers, as well as eight twin-bedded cabins accommodating 16 first class passengers on the bridge deck.

== Service history ==
Skaubryn's main service was from European ports to Sydney, Australia, though she also made a number of sailings to Canada. In 1953 she carried French Foreign Legion troops to fight in Indochina. One of them who escaped the ship, Ensio Tiira, later wrote a book about his subsequent experience on a raft for 32 days. She was chartered several times, once by the French Government in the mid-1950s to bring troops back from Vietnam. Skaubryn was one of the last vessels to pass through the Suez Canal immediately before its closure due to the Suez Crisis of 1956. In late September 1956 the Dutch Government used her for a single voyage from Rotterdam to Halifax and New York. That same year and in early 1957, she was chartered by the British Government to transport troops from Singapore to the UK. The Greek Line chartered her later in 1957 for four round trips from Europe and the UK to Quebec, after which she returned on the Australian emigrant service again.

=== Sinking ===
On March 14, 1958, Skaubryn left Bremerhaven with 1,288 passengers aboard. On March 31, whilst in the Indian Ocean a fire broke out which quickly spread, though all the passengers safely evacuated the ship in her lifeboats. One passenger died due to a heart attack whilst still in a lifeboat. Fortunately the sea was calm. The first ship to come to her rescue was the Polish Ocean Lines cargo ship Małgorzata fornalska. The rescued crew and passengers and people was transferred to Ellerman Lines cargo liner City of Sydney, but she could not provide accommodation. The next day, the Lloyd Triestino passenger liner Roma arrived and all passengers were transferred to her.

The fire on the Skaubryn caused great damage to her forward and central superstructure, whilst her stern remained untouched. An attempt was made to tow her to Aden, first by HMS Loch Fada, then by the Dutch Tug Cycloop, however, Skaubryn slowly took on water and she eventually sank on April 6, 1958.
