= Mode-class destroyer =

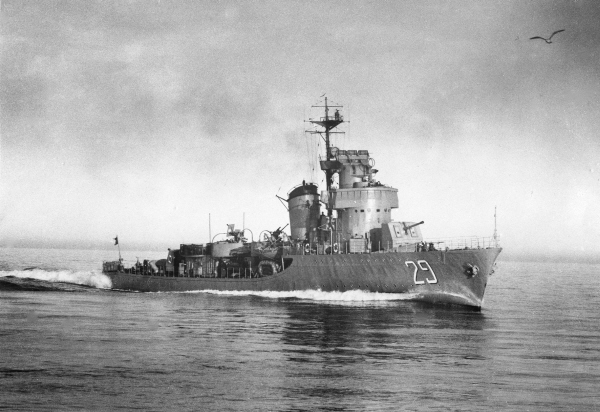
- Mode at sea

Class overview
- Name: Mode class
- Operators: Swedish Navy
- Preceded by: Romulus class
- Succeeded by: Visby class
- Built: 1941–1943
- In commission: 1942–1970
- Planned: 4
- Completed: 4
- Scrapped: 4

General characteristics
- Type: Destroyer/Frigate
- Displacement: - 750 t (740 long tons; 830 short tons), standard displacement; - 960 t (945 long tons; 1,058 short tons), full load
- Length: 255 ft 11 in (78.00 m)
- Beam: 26 ft 3 in (8.00 m)
- Draught: 8 ft 10 in (2.69 m)
- Propulsion: 2 oil fired boilers, 2 de Laval steam turbines, 16,000 shp (12 MW), 2 screws
- Speed: 30 knots (35 mph; 56 km/h)
- Range: 1,260 nmi (2,330 km) at 20 kn (23 mph; 37 km/h)
- Complement: 100
- Armament: (as built); 3 × 105 mm (4 in) Bofors K/50 M/42 DP guns (3×1); 2 × 40 mm (2 in) Bofors K/60 M/36 guns (2×1); 2 × 20 mm (1 in) Bofors K/66 M/40 guns (2×1); 3 × 21 in (533 mm) torpedo tubes (1×3)

The Mode class or Mjölner class was a class of four coastal destroyers commissioned by the Royal Swedish Navy during World War II. The design was based on the preceding Psilander class purchased from Italy but with Swedish equipment and armament. The destroyers served as coastal escorts. The class was moderately upgraded and reclassified as frigates during the early part of the Cold War. After nearly thirty years of service, the last vessel was retired in 1970.

== Background ==
At the start of World War II, Swedish destroyer design had culminated in the Göteborg class, a powerful but expensive design. To meet the needs of the rapidly expanding navy, Sweden looked to foreign designs and procured four ships from Italy, two each of the Psilander and Romulus classes. Italy also provided the blueprints for a more modern version of Psilander, which was used by the designers at Götaverken in Gothenburg as the basis to develop a new light destroyer. Götaverken also built the first two vessels of the class of four ships.

== Design and development ==
=== Design ===
The destroyers have been described as, "more an expression of standardization, simplicity and simple building methods than carefully planned men of war." They were small, only 78 m (255 ft 11 in) long, shorter than the British Hunt class of escort destroyers then being produced in large numbers for the Royal Navy and its allies. Displacement was 750 long tons (760 t) normal and 960 long tons (980 t) full load, beam 26 ft 3 in (8.00 m) and draught 8 ft 10 in (2.69 m). The bridge was wider than the superstructure, giving the vessels a distinctive appearance from the prow compared to other Swedish destroyers.

Machinery consisted of two Penhoët A oil-fired boilers, which supplied steam to two de Laval geared steam turbines, each driving its own propeller. The turbines were rated at 16,000 shp (12,000 kW) to give a design speed of 30 knots (56 km/h; 35 mph). 190 long tons (190 t) of fuel was carried to give a range of 1,260 nautical miles (2,330 km) at 20 knots (23 mph; 37 km/h). A crew of 100 officers and ratings was carried.

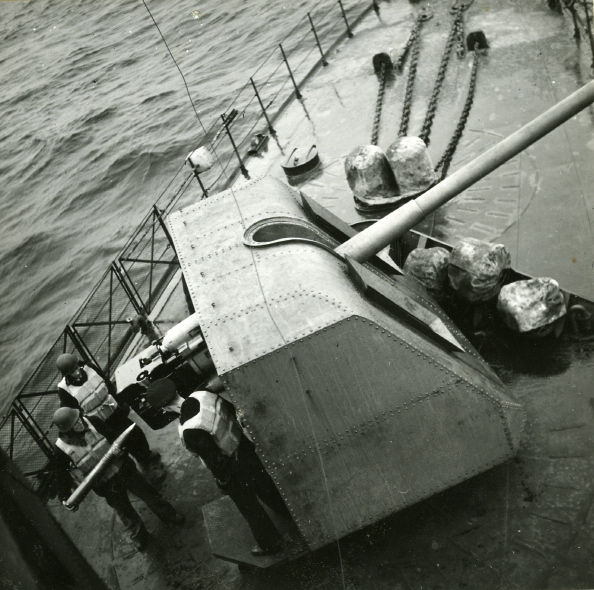
The forward gun aboard Mjölner

=== Armament ===
Weaponry was manufactured in Sweden. The main armament consisted of three 10.5 cm (4 in) K/50 M42 guns produced by Bofors. These were placed in separate mounts, one on the fore deck, one on the aft deck and one on the aft superstructure. Air defence consisted two 40 mm (1.57 in) K/60 M36 and two 20 mm (0.79 in) K/66 M40 individually mounted anti-aircraft autocannons, also provided by Bofors.

Three torpedo tubes for 53 cm (21 in) torpedoes were triple mounted aft of the superstructure and two depth charge throwers were mounted further towards the stern. 42 mines could also be carried for minelaying.

=== Name ===
The class is known both as the Mode class, after the first vessel ordered, and the Mjölner class, after the first vessel launched. The vessels were named after characters and objects in Norse mythology, Mode and Magne, the sons of Thor, his hammer Mjölnir and Munin, one of the ravens that serve Odin.

== Ships ==
Name	Pennant numbers	Builder	Laid down	Launched	Commissioned	Stricken	Fate	Notes
Mode	29, 73	Götaverken	September 1941	11 April 1942	12 November 1942	1 July 1970	Sold for scrap in 1973 in Ystad	
Magne	30, 74	Götaverken	September 1941	25 April 1942	November 1942	January 1966	Sold for scrap in 1973 in Ystad	
Munin	31, 75	Öresundsvarvet	September 1941	25 May 1942	3 January 1943	6 December 1968	Sold for scrap in 1969 in Gothenburg	
Mjölner	32, 76	Eriksberg	September 1941	9 April 1942	12 November 1942	1 April 1966	Sold for scrap in 1969 in Gothenburg	

== Service ==
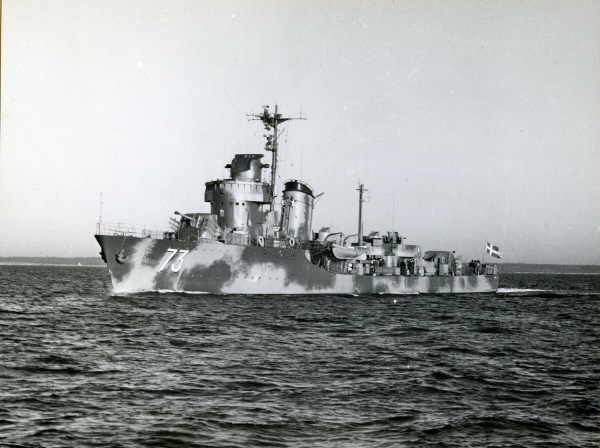
Mode in 1959 after conversion

The four destroyers of the class were launched in 1942 and entered service in the Royal Swedish Navy. They operated in the escort role. During World War II, they served as part of the Swedish coastal fleet enforcing the country's neutrality but suffered no loss. Following the war, they escorted major warships like the anti-aircraft cruiser Gotland on goodwill visits to countries like Belgium, Ireland and France.

=== Modernisation ===
The class were modernised between 1954 and 1955 and re-rated as frigates. One of the 105 mm (4.1 in) main guns was removed, along with the triple 533 mm (21.0 in) torpedo tube mount. A single Squid depth charge launcher was fitted to improve anti-submarine capabilities and the 40 mm (1.6 in) guns were upgraded. The class remained in service in this capacity until decommissioning.
