= SS Pink Star =

History
- Name: Saga (1926-1931); Lundby (1931-1941); Pink Star (1941)
- Owner: Waages Rederi, Norway (1926-1931); A.E. Reimann, Denmark (1931-1941); War Shipping Administration, USA (1941)
- Builder: Öresundsvarvet, Landskrona
- Yard number: 25
- Launched: 1926
- Identification: Official number: 5606466
- Fate: Sunk, 20 September 1941

General characteristics
- Type: Steam merchant ship
- Tonnage: 4,150 GRT 6,850 DWT
- Length: 108.8 m (356 ft 11 in)
- Beam: 15.6 m (51 ft 2 in)
- Depth: 7.7 m (25 ft 3 in)
- Propulsion: 391 nhp triple expansion steam engine, 1 shaft
- Speed: 11 knots (20 km/h; 13 mph)
- Crew: 35

SS Pink Star, the former Danish ship Lundby taken over as an idle foreign vessel in United States ports, was an American-owned ship flying under the Panamanian flag. Pink Star was the seventh American ship sunk by a German U-boat prior the United States entry into World War II. On September 20, 1941, she was torpedoed by U-552.

== Ship history ==
The 4,150-ton steel-hulled ship was built by Öresundsvarvet of Landskrona in Sweden, and completed in 1926. Under the name Saga she was owned by Waages Rederi of Oslo, Norway, until 1931, when she was sold to A.E. Reimann of Stensved, Denmark, and renamed Lundby.

On July 12, 1941, Lundby was requisitioned by the United States Government and ownership was transferred to the War Shipping Administration. In August 1941 she was assigned to the United States Lines Inc. under a General Agency Agreement (GAA), renamed Pink Star and registered in Panama.

On September 3, 1941 Pink Star sailed from New York as part of Convoy SC 44, bound for the United Kingdom. The ship was loaded with general cargo with a crew, due to provisions of the Neutrality Act prohibiting United States flagged vessels or citizens sailing into war zones, composed of 8 Canadians including Master John Cogswell Mackenzie, 8 Netherlanders, 6 Britons, 3 Belgians, 3 Chinese and one each of Polish, French, Portuguese, Irish, Danish and Ecuadorian nationality. At 01:51 on September 20, 1941, U-552, under the command of Erich Topp fired a spread of torpedoes into the convoy. Only Pink Star was hit, and quickly sank at position 61°36′N 35°7′W. Of her crew of 35 men, 13 died with the ship; one was American, one British, five Canadian, one French, one Danish, two Dutch and one Chinese.

The sinking came seven days after the United States had warned Germany concerning attacks on shipping in the Western Atlantic and three days after Secretary of the Navy Knox announced the Navy would take protective measures. The attack was the first since the announcements and was used to support Lend Lease in Congress and to question validity of the Neutrality acts supported by isolationists in Congress.

== Bibliography ==
- Maritime Administration. "Pink Star". Ship History Database Vessel Status Card. U.S. Department of Transportation, Maritime Administration. Archived from the original on April 2, 2015.
- Ottawa Citizen (1941). "Another American-Owned Ship Sunk in Zone Guarded by War Vessels". Ottawa Citizen (September 23, 1941). Ottawa: 13.
- Ottawa Citizen (1941). "Hitler Shoots First Following U.S. Warning". Ottawa Citizen (September 23, 1941). Ottawa: 3.
- Palm Beach Post (1941). "16 More Idle Danish Cargo Vessels Are Taken Over By The Government". The Palm Beach Post-Times. 8 (July 13, 1941). West Palm Beach, Florida: Palm Beach Publishing, Inc.: 10.
