= HSwMS Mode (29) =

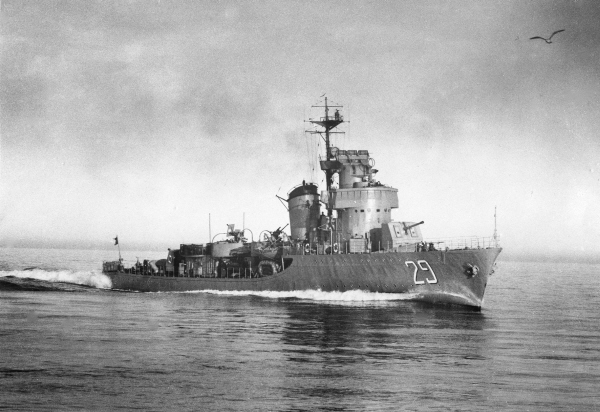
- HSwMS Mode

History

Sweden
- Name: Mode
- Namesake: Mode
- Builder: Götaverken, Gothenburg
- Laid down: September 1941
- Launched: 11 April 1942
- Commissioned: 12 November 1942
- Decommissioned: 1 July 1970
- Fate: Scrapped 1978

General characteristics
- Class & type: Mode-class destroyer (1942-1953) or frigate (1953-1970)
- Displacement: - 960 t (945 long tons), full load; - 750 t (740 long tons), standard displacement
- Length: 256 ft (78 m)
- Beam: 26 ft 3 in (8.00 m)
- Draught: 8 ft 10 in (2.69 m)
- Propulsion: 2 oil fired boilers, 2 de Laval steam turbines, 16,000 shp (12,000 kW), 2 screws
- Speed: 30 knots (56 km/h; 35 mph)
- Range: 1,260 nmi (2,330 km; 1,450 mi) at 20 kn (37 km/h; 23 mph)
- Complement: 100
- Armament: 3 × 105 mm Bofors K/50 M/42 DP guns (3×1); 2 × Bofors 40 mm L/60 guns K/60 M/36 (2×1); 2 × 20 mm Bofors K/66 M/40 (2×1); 3 × 21 in (533 mm) torpedo tubes (1×3)

HSwMS Mode was a coastal destroyer of the Royal Swedish Navy, built by Götaverken and launched on 11 April 1942 as the lead of the four ship Mode class. Developed from an Italian design, the ship was capable of a wide range of roles, with depth charges to defeat submarines, torpedo tubes to attack ships and anti-aircraft guns for aerial defence, as well as mine laying capability. After serving during World War II, the ship was updated with greater anti-submarine capability and reclassified a frigate in 1953. Decommissioned on 1 July 1970, Mode subsequently operated in a training role until being scrapped in 1978.

== Design and development ==
Mode was the first ordered of a class of four Swedish destroyers based on the Spica class designed in Italy. Small and ideal for coastal operation, the design was a cheaper alternative to traditional designs to meet the requirements of the rapidly expanding Swedish Navy. The vessel was named after the son of Thor.

Displacement was 750 tonnes (740 long tons) standard and 960 tonnes (940 long tons; 1,060 short tons) full load. Overall length was 256 feet (78.03 m), beam 26 ft 3 in (8.00 m) and draught 8 ft 10 in (2.69 m). A crew of 100 officers and ratings was carried.

Machinery consisted of two Penhoët A oil-fired boilers, which supplied steam to two de Laval geared steam turbines, each driving its own propeller. The turbines were rated at 16,000 shp (12,000 kW) to give a design speed of 30 knots (56 km/h; 35 mph). 190 tonnes (190 long tons) of fuel was carried to give a range of 1,260 nautical miles (2,330 km; 1,450 mi) at 20 knots (37 km/h; 23 mph).

The main armament consisted of three 10.5 cm (4 in) K/50 M42 guns produced by Bofors. These were placed in separate mounts, one on the fore deck, one on the aft deck and one on the aft superstructure. Air defence consisted two 40 mm (1.57 in) K/60 M36 and two 20 mm (0.79 in) K/66 M40 individually mounted anti-aircraft autocannons, also provided by Bofors. Three torpedo tubes for 53 cm (21 in) torpedoes were triple mounted aft of the superstructure and two depth charge throwers were mounted further towards the stern. 42 mines could also be carried for minelaying.

== Construction and service ==
Mode was laid down by Götaverken in Gothenburg in September 1941. The vessel was launched on 11 April 1942, delivered to the Navy on 8 October the same year and commissioned on 12 November, serving with the Coastal Fleet through World War II. The ship was allocated the pennant number 29. In 1947 Mode accompanied Gotland and Munin on a trip to France and Britain. The fleet visited Le Havre, Lyme Bay, Torquay, Glasgow and Oban.

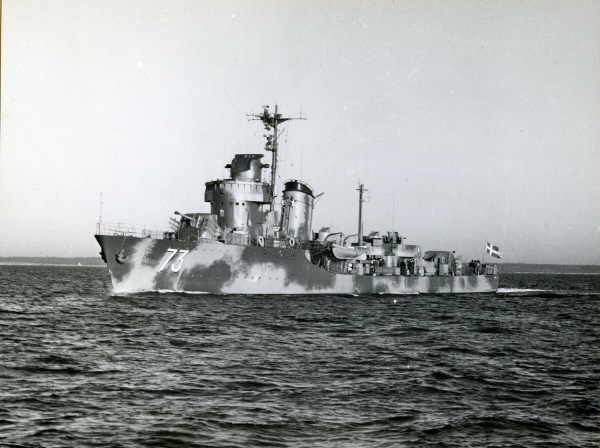
Mode in 1959 after conversion

=== Modernisation ===
Mode was modernised in 1953 and re-rated as a frigate. One of the 105 mm (4.1 in) main guns was removed, along with the triple 533 mm (21.0 in) torpedo tubes. Instead a single Squid depth charge launcher was fitted to improve anti-submarine capabilities and the 40 mm (1.6 in) guns were upgraded to provide greater anti-aircraft protection. After the conversion, Mode retained minelaying capability. The upgraded ship was allocated the pennant number 73.

=== Disposal ===
Mode was decommissioned on 1 July 1970 and was used as training vessel until being scrapped at Ystad in 1978.
