= Öresundsvarvet =

Coordinates: 55°51′39″N 12°49′50″E

- Industry: Shipbuilding
- Founded: 1915
- Founder: Arthur Du Rietz
- Defunct: 1982
- Fate: Dissolved
- Headquarters: Landskrona, Sweden
- Number of employees: 3500 (1975)

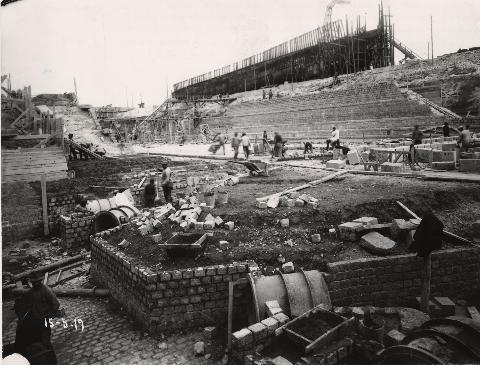
Öresundsvarvet shipyard in 1919.

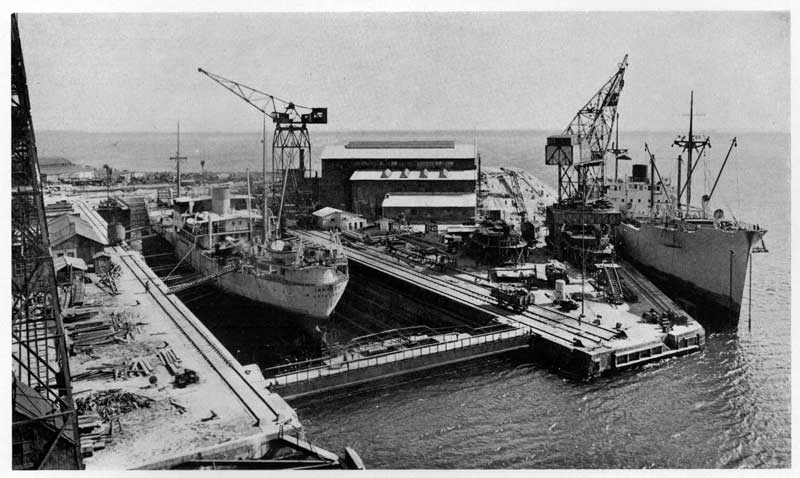
Equipment quay with engineering and dry dock in 1947.

Öresundsvarvet was a Swedish shipyard in Landskrona that was established in 1915 and largely phased out between 1980 and 1982.

== Foundation ==
Öresundsvarvet was constituted on 16 December 1915 by Gothenburg shipbuilder, Arthur Du Rietz. During a visit to Landskrona, Du Rietz heard that the city wanted to complement its industry with a shipyard. The authorities suggested an area alongside the harbor called Sydpiren, which was then under water. Du Rietz was contracted to build a shipyard with two slipways on a 50,000-square-metre (540,000 sq ft) plot, 2 metres (6 ft 7 in) above sea level. The city committed to provide a 1 kilometre (0.62 mi) long railway embankment and a 50-metre (160 ft) berth. Du Rietz pledged to immediately then build a shipyard with two slipways. Construction began in 1916 and included a large dry dock 189.4 metres (621 ft) in length. As World War I wasn't resolved in "a few months" (which was the general assumption by most people in the summer of 1914), there was a period of an increasing demand, both for more vessels in general, as well as an equal demand of more modern ships. By November 1918, Öresundsvarvet was already more than well ready to continue delivering various kinds of vessels. But after the 1918 Armistice, which ended the war, the number of ordered ships began to decrease. Despite this decrease, the shipyard survived and better times was to come.

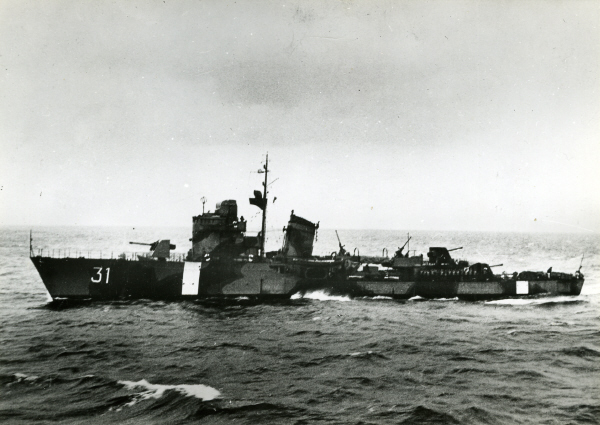
Munin

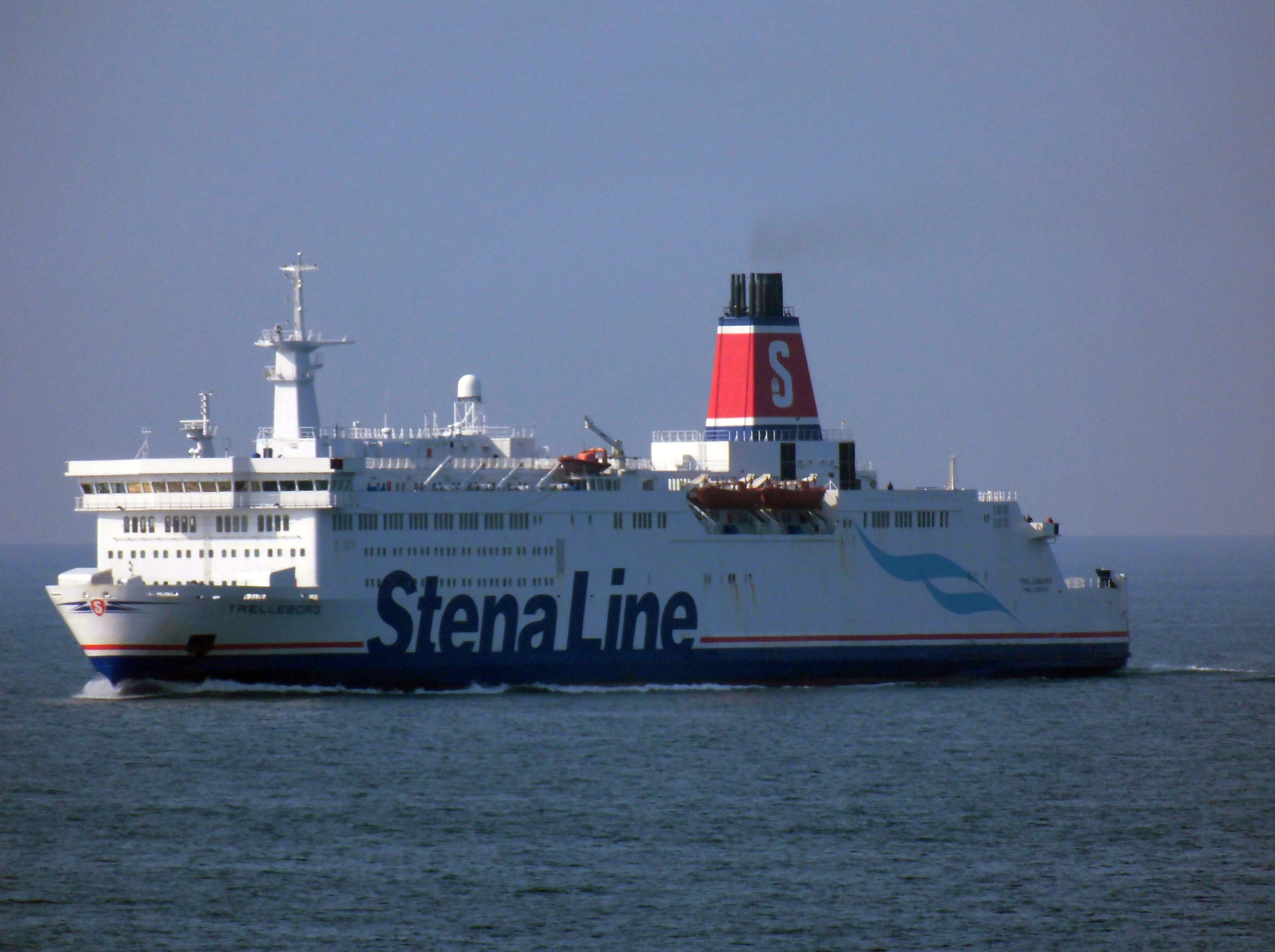
MS Trelleborg

== Growth ==
The shipyard was opened on 21 September 1918 with the launch of the first ship, the steamer Torild, built by Rederi AB Percivald in Landskrona. The company expanded quickly and by Autumn 1920 the yard had grown to 15 hectares (37 acres) with a 150-metre (490 ft) long fit-out in 7 metres (23 ft) of water. In 1922, the shipyard could build eleven new vessels of 50,000 tonnes (49,000 long tons; 55,000 short tons), but it was declared bankrupt due to poor economic conditions. New Oresund Shipbuilding Company (Swedish: Nya Varvsaktiebolaget Öresund) was formed in April 1923 which could build seven vessels of 26,000 tonnes (26,000 long tons; 29,000 short tons) deadweight. In 1935, the company name was changed to Öresundsvarvet AB. A floating dock for vessels up to 5,000 tonnes (4,900 long tons; 5,500 short tons) was purchased from Copenhagen in 1936. The shipyard was taken over in 1940 by Götaverken, who then supplied the shipyard's newbuildings with new machinery. During World War II, the yard built a coastal destroyer and two minesweepers. In all, during the period from 1931 to 1944 the shipyard built fifty ships totalling 220,000 tonnes (220,000 long tons; 240,000 short tons).

The yard experienced post-war economic growth and had expanded by 1975 to 3,500 employees. In 1972, it built one of the world's largest container ships Nihon for the Swedish East Asiatic Company.

== Closure ==
After the 1973 energy & oil crisis, the demand for new oil tankers rapidly decreased worldwide. As such vessels had been a major product for most shipyards during 15–20 years prior to 1973, did the aftermath of this enormous crisis (as OPEC nearly quadrupled the oil price in dollars, in a response to US President Nixon's aid to Israel during the Yom Kippur War) include a severe crisis for most larger shipyards, also in Sweden.

Öresundsvarvet was taken over by the state-owned shipbuilding group Svenska Varv AB in 1977. The last ship, building number 282, was delivered in 1982. The shipyard was sold in December 1982 for 1 krona to Landskrona Finance.

== Subsequent activities ==
Smaller activities continued in the area after the yard closed. A new repair yard named Cityvarvet AB took over about 200 employees, while a similar number joined Bruces Shipyard making hulls. In 2010 the operation was renamed Oresund Heavy Industries AB and remains active in ship repair.

== Selected ships constructed ==
- 1926 SS Saga
- 1930 SS Belgia
- 1943 HSwMS Munin
- 1950 MS Skaubryn
- 1972 MS Nihon
- 1980 MS Visby
- 1981 MS Trelleborg
