= Romulus-class destroyer =

Naval ship class

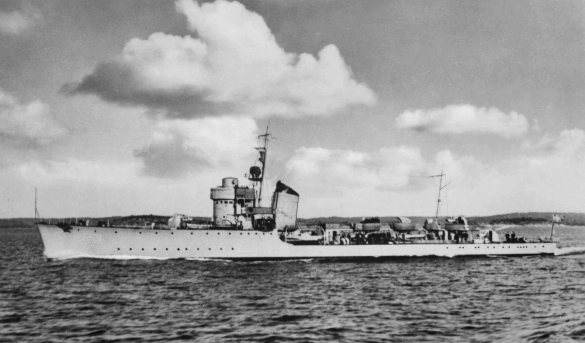
- Romulus

Class overview
- Name: Romulus class
- Operators: Swedish Navy
- Succeeded by: Mode class
- Built: 1934
- In service: 1940–1958
- Completed: 2
- Scrapped: 2

General characteristics
- Type: Destroyer
- Displacement: 630 long tons (640 t) (standard)
- Length: 81.4 m (267 ft 1 in)
- Beam: 8.2 m (26 ft 11 in)
- Draft: 2.3 m (7 ft 7 in)
- Installed power: 2 Yarrow boilers; 19,000 shp (14,000 kW)
- Propulsion: 2 shafts; 2 geared steam turbines
- Speed: 34 knots (63 km/h; 39 mph)
- Range: 1,700 nmi (3,100 km; 2,000 mi) at 16 knots (30 km/h; 18 mph)
- Complement: 99
- Sensors & processing systems: Sonar and hydrophones
- Armament: 3 × single 100 mm (3.9 in) 100/47 DP guns; 3 × single 20 mm (0.8 in) AA guns; 2 × twin 457 mm (18 in) torpedo tubes (2 × twin mounts); 2 × depth charge throwers; 28 × mines

The Romulus class was a class of two destroyers operated by the Royal Swedish Navy during the Second World War and into the first decades of the Cold War.

== Design and description ==
The Romulus-class ships consisted of two Spica-class torpedo boat purchased from the Royal Italian Navy in March 1940 that had been built in Italy as Spica and Astore. The ships displaced 630 long tons (640 t) at standard load and 900 tonnes (890 long tons) at deep load. They measured 81.4 meters (267 ft 1 in) long overall with a beam of 8.2 meters (26 ft 11 in), and a draft of 2.3 meters (7 ft 7 in). The Romulus's were propelled by two Tosi geared steam turbines, each driving one propeller shaft using steam from a pair of Yarrow boilers. The turbines were designed to produce a total of 19,000 shaft horsepower (14,000 kW) for an intended maximum speed of 34 knots (63 km/h; 39 mph). The ships carried enough fuel oil to give them a range of 1,700 nautical miles (3,100 km; 2,000 mi) at 16 knots (30 km/h; 18 mph). The ships' crew numbered 99.

The main armament of the Romulus class consisted of three 100-millimeter (3.9 in) dual-purpose guns in single mounts. One gun was located at the forecastle and the others were in superfiring mounts at the stern. After modifications by the Royal Swedish Navy, their anti-aircraft defense was provided by three 20-millimeter (0.8 in) Breda AA guns in single mounts and a pair of 13.2-millimeter (0.5 in) M/31 heavy machine guns. The ships were equipped with four 533-millimeter (21 in) torpedo tubes in two rotating, twin-tube mounts located between the rear funnel and the stern gun. Two depth charge throwers were fitted and the ships could carry 28 mines.

== Ships ==
| Name | Pennant numbers | Builder | Launched | Acquired | Decommissioned | Fate |
|---|---|---|---|---|---|---|
| Romulus | 27 | BSN, Naples | 30 May 1935 | 1940 from Italy | 1958 | Scrapped, 1961 |
| Remus | 28 | BSN, Naples | 30 May 1935 | 1940 from Italy | 1958 | Scrapped, 1961 |
