= HSwMS Magne (30) =

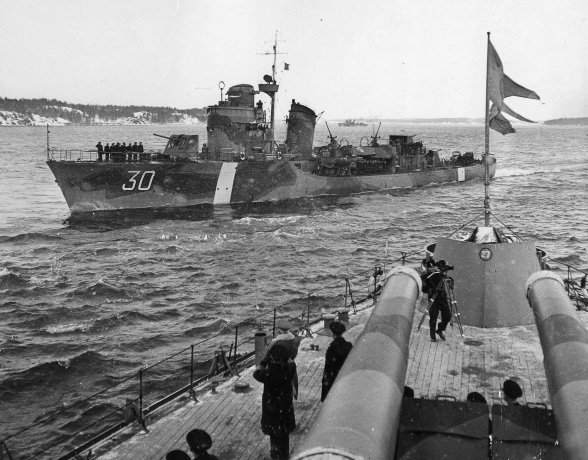

History

Sweden
- Name: Magne
- Namesake: Magni
- Builder: Götaverken, Gothenburg
- Laid down: September 1941
- Launched: 25 April 1942
- Completed: 26 November 1942
- Stricken: 1 January 1966
- Fate: Scrapped 1973

General characteristics
- Class & type: Mode-class destroyer
- Displacement: 740 long tons (752 t)
- Length: 256 ft (78 m)
- Beam: 26 ft 6 in (8.08 m)
- Draught: 9 ft (2.7 m)
- Propulsion: Steam turbines, 16,000 shp (12 MW), 2 screws
- Speed: 30 knots (35 mph; 56 km/h)
- Complement: 100
- Armament: 3 × 105mm/50 Bofors M/42 DP guns (3×1); 2 × 40 mm guns M/36 (2×1); 2 × Bofors 20mm/66 M/40 (2×1); 3 × 21 in (533 mm) torpedo tubes (1×3)

HSwMS Magne (30) was a Mode-class destroyer of the Swedish Navy during World War II. She was built at Götaverken and was launched on 25 April 1942 as the second ship of the Mode class. The ship was rebuilt in the mid-1950s and reclassified to frigate in 1953 when she received pennant number 74. Magne was scrapped in Ystad in 1973. The name comes from Magni, the son of Thor in Nordic mythology.

== Design ==
Magne was 78 meters long, 8.1 meters wide and had a depth of 2.3 meters. The default deployment was 635 tons and the maximum displacement was 785 tons. The machinery consisted of two Penhoët A oil-fired boilers, which supplied steam to two steam turbines which propelled their propellers. The machine developed 16,000 horsepower, which gave the ship a maximum speed of 30 knots (55 km/h). The main armament consisted of three 10.5 cm guns m/42. These were placed in separate towers, one on the back deck, one on the aft deck and one on the aft superstructure. The air defense was consisted of two 40 mm anti-aircraft automatic guns m/36 and two 20 mm anti-aircraft automatic guns m/40. Three torpedo tubes for 53 cm torpedoes sitting in a triple set of the aft superstructure and further were two depth charge thrower and two rack-deployed depth charges. 42 mines could also be carried for mining.

== History ==
Magne was built at Götaverken in Gothenburg and was launched on 25 April 1942 and was delivered to the Swedish Navy already on 26 November that year. After delivery, Magne entered the Coastal Fleet, where she served during the rest of World War II.

In 1953 Magne was reclassified to frigate and was rebuilt in the mid-1950s. One of the 10.5 cm guns as well as the torpedo racks was then removed and the 40 mm guns m/36 were replaced m/48 with the same caliber. In addition, an anti-submarine grenade m/51.

=== Fate ===
Magne was decommissioned on 1 January 1966 and was subsequently used as training ship at the machinery school at the Berga Naval Training Schools. In 1973 the ship was scrapped in Ystad.
