= HSwMS Clas Fleming =

Swedish cruiser-minelayer (1914–1959)

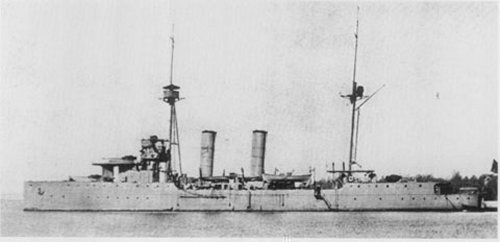
- Clas Fleming c. 1914–1915

History

Sweden
- Name: Clas Fleming
- Namesake: Clas Fleming
- Ordered: 17 May 1910
- Builder: Bergsund Finnboda, Stockholm
- Launched: 14 December 1912
- Commissioned: 1914
- Refit: Reconstructed, December 1939–August 1940
- Stricken: 1959
- Fate: Sold for scrap, 9 November 1960
- Badge

General characteristics (as built)
- Type: Cruiser-minelayer
- Displacement: 1,550 long tons (1,575 t) (standard)
- Length: 80.2 m (263 ft 1 in)
- Beam: 10.4 m (34 ft 1 in)
- Draft: 4.3 m (14 ft 1 in)
- Installed power: 8 × Yarrow boilers; 7,000 shp (5,220 kW)
- Propulsion: 2 shafts; 2 direct-drive steam turbines
- Speed: 20 knots (37 km/h; 23 mph)
- Complement: 161
- Armament: 4 × single 120 mm (4.7 in) guns; 190 mines
- Armor: Deck: 16–25 mm (0.6–1.0 in); Conning tower: 30–75 mm (1.2–3.0 in)

HSwMS Clas Fleming was a cruiser-minelayer built before World War I for the Royal Swedish Navy. Completed in 1914, the ship performed limited neutrality patrols in the Sea of Åland and the northern reaches of the Stockholm Archipelago during the war. She was placed in reserve in 1917 to be modified to make laying mines safer and remained in that status until the beginning of World War II in 1939 to save money. Clas Fleming was activated for a short time that year to lay defensive minefields before she began a reconstruction that installed an early version of gas turbines, the first warship in the world to be so equipped. After her sea trials were completed in 1940, she was on active service for the rest of the war. Clas Fleming was again reduced to reserve at that time and did not leave the dockyard before she was stricken from the navy list in 1959. The ship briefly served as a target ship before being sold for scrap the following year.

== Background and description ==
In 1908 the Swedish Board of Admiralty requested funding from the King in Council for a fast minelayer able to lay mines off the enemy coast at night when the ship would be less likely to be spotted. This decision was probably based on the very successful use of naval mines by both sides during the Russo-Japanese War of 1904–1905. This was granted the following year with the proviso that the ship be powered by steam turbines and be capable of conducting scouting for the fleet. The board requested bids in early January 1910 and awarded the contract to Bergsund on 21 January for a price of 1,493,350 Swedish krona.

Clas Fleming had an overall length of 80.2 metres (263 ft 1 in), a beam of 10.4 metres (34 ft 1 in) and a draught of 4.3 metres (14 ft 1 in). The ship displaced was 1,550 long tons (1,570 t) at standard load and 1,800 long tons (1,829 t) at deep load. Eight Yarrow boilers fed steam at a pressure of 17 kg/cm^{2} (1,667 kPa; 242 psi) to a pair of Parsons direct-drive steam turbines that each drove a single propeller shaft. The engines were rated at a total of 7,000 shaft horsepower (5,200 kW) which gave her a speed of 20 knots (37 km/h; 23 mph). Clas Fleming carried up to 265 long tons (269 t) of coal and had a complement of 8 officers and 153 ratings.

The ship was armed with four single Bofors 50-calibre 120-millimetre (4.7 in) guns in superfiring pairs, one forward and another aft of the superstructure. These guns fired a 21-kilogram (46 lb) shell at a muzzle velocity of 860 metres per second (2,800 ft/s). A 3-metre (9.8 ft) stereoscopic rangefinder was provided to feed the guns targeting data. Up to 190 mines could be carried on the main deck; they were dropped through doors in the stern. Clas Fleming was fitted with a nickel steel armoured deck that had a maximum thickness of 25 millimetres (1 in) at the ends of the ship and 16 millimetres (0.6 in) amidships. The conning tower was protected by 75-millimetre (3 in) plates and its roof was 30 millimetres (1.2 in) thick.

=== Modifications ===
Active service had shown that the ship's coal consumption was much higher than expected, making her deployments uneconomical at a time when good-quality steam coal had to be imported at great expense. The mine doors at the stern were too close to the water and posed a risk of flooding in a following sea. To remedy this issue the ship's stern was rebuilt in 1918–1919 so that mine doors were situated on the upper deck and the poop deck was extended to the stern. The guns at the stern and on the conning tower were accordingly moved to broadside positions amidships, which received small gun shields to protect their crews. In 1926 three Vickers 25 mm anti-aircraft (AA) guns were added, one on the conning tower and two just behind the amidships 120 mm guns.

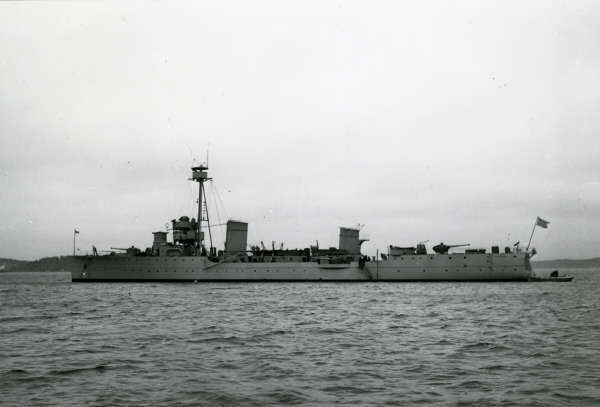
Clas Fleming in 1940 after her gas turbines had been installed

During the early 1930s, Erik Johansson, an engineer at Götaverken, had developed a gas turbine powered by air compressors and diesel engine exhaust. The shipyard had successfully installed two of these systems in ships and offered to build one for Clas Fleming, the world's first warship powered by gas turbines. The Navy had no funding available for experimental propulsion systems until money for design work was made available through the Social Affairs Department for unemployment relief at the shipyard in 1934. Negotiations between the Navy and Götaverken began a few years later and a contract was finally signed in December 1939.

To accommodate the new propulsion machinery, the ship had to be lengthened with a 6-metre-long (20 ft) section amidships. Six of the original boilers were removed with the remaining pair retained to operate the ship's steam-powered auxiliary machinery, although they were converted to burn fuel oil. The steam turbines were replaced by a pair of 3,250-shaft-horsepower (2,420 kW) de Laval gas turbines that would give Clas Fleming a maximum speed of 20 knots. Power for the turbines was indirectly supplied by four 6-cylinder, two-stroke, diesel engines that operated four 3-cylinder, double-acting air compressors that delivered the mixture of diesel exhaust and air at a pressure of about 4 atm (405 kPa; 4 kgf/cm^{2}) and a temperature of 400–500 °C (752–932 °F) to the turbines. The ship's coal bunkers were converted into fuel oil tanks for the new engines and modified boilers.

The Navy decided to advantage of the ship's reconstruction and had a new bow installed together with modifications to the mine doors. The budget for the reconstruction was 889,300 kronor, but costs had increased to over a million kronor by the end of 1940. After the engineering trials were completed, other changes were made to the ship and its equipment, among which was modifying the elevation of the 120 mm gun mounts which increased their range to 16,000 metres (17,000 yd) and installing larger gun shields. A second rangefinder was installed on the aft superstructure, the mainmast was removed, and 40 mm (1.6 in) Bofors guns replaced the Vickers AA guns. In addition two depth charge throwers were added on the stern and magazine was modified to hold 100 depth charges for them. Later, the Navy decided to add a dummy funnel between the existing funnels for aesthetic reasons. It was used for storage, carrying, amongst other equipment, the crew's skis for use in winter.

== Construction and career ==
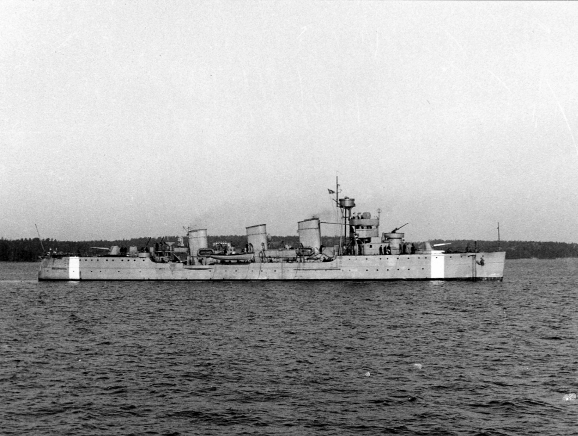
Clas Fleming in 1943

Named after the 17th-century Swedish admiral Clas Fleming, the ship was ordered from Bergsund Finnboda on 17 May 1910 at a cost of SEK 1,493,350. Laid down at the company's shipyard in Stockholm, Clas Fleming was launched on 14 December 1912, but completion was delayed by quality-control problems with the steel used in her hull and lengthy sea trials. She was finally commissioned into the active fleet in mid-1914. The ship conducted neutrality patrols until she was reduced to reserve in late 1917 in preparation for a refit that began the following year. Clas Fleming remained in reserve after the refit was completed.

On 24 August 1930, the coastal defense ship Manligheten ran aground while sailing between Stockholm and Hårsfjärden in poor weather. Efforts by Clas Fleming and the coastal battleship Drottning Victoria were unsuccessful in freeing the ship. Despite the minimal maintenance the ship had received while she was in reserve, she was mobilized after the beginning of World War II in 1939 to lay mines in the area of the Åland Islands and returned to reserve afterwards. In December Clas Fleming began a reconstruction that installed the first gas turbines used in a warship. The work was finished on 8 August 1940. The cruiser was to return to active service on 3 September but she did not rejoin the fleet until 22 days later. The new machinery proved to be unreliable and the cruiser was back in the dock in November for maintenance. She then served as part of the Coastal Fleet until 1944. It was clear, by this time, that the ship was in need of major work if she were to remain in service. After the end of the war in May 1945, Clas Fleming was placed in reserve in Stockholm, and was stricken in 1959. She was used as a target before being sold for scrap on 9 November 1960.

== Bibliography ==
- Anderberg, Magnus; Areschoug, Richard; Cederlund, Carl Olof (2012). Stockholm Örlogsstaden [Stockholm, Naval City] (in Swedish). Stockholm: Föreningen Sveriges Sjöfartsmuseum.
- Friedman, Norman (2011). Naval Weapons of World War One: Guns, Torpedoes, Mines and ASW Weapons of All Nations; An Illustrated Directory. Barnsley, UK: Seaforth Publishing. ISBN 978-1-84832-100-7.
- Harris, Daniel G. (2004). Preston, Antony (ed.). Minelayer Clas Fleming: An Early Gas Turbine Ship. London: Conway Maritime Press. pp. 92–98. ISBN 0-85177-948-4.
- Holmqvist, Åke (1972). Flottans Beredskap 1938–1940 [Navy Readiness 1938–1940] (in Swedish). Karlskrona: Allmänna Förlaget. OCLC 462115352.
- Insulander, Per & Ohlsson, Curt S (2001). Pansarskepp - Från John Ericsson till Gustav V [Armoured ships from John Ericsson to Gustav V] (in Swedish). Falkenberg: C B Marinlitteratur AB. ISBN 978-9-19731-872-3.
- Westerlund, Karl-Eric (1980). "Sweden". In Chesneau, Roger (ed.). Conway's All the World's Fighting Ships 1922–1946. New York: Mayflower Books. pp. 368–377. ISBN 0-8317-0303-2.
- Westerlund, Karl-Eric (1985). "Sweden". In Gray, Randal (ed.). Conway's All the World's Fighting Ships 1906–1921. London: Conway Maritime Press. pp. 355–363. ISBN 978-0-85177-245-5.
