= HSwMS Munin (31) =

Royal Swedish Navy warship

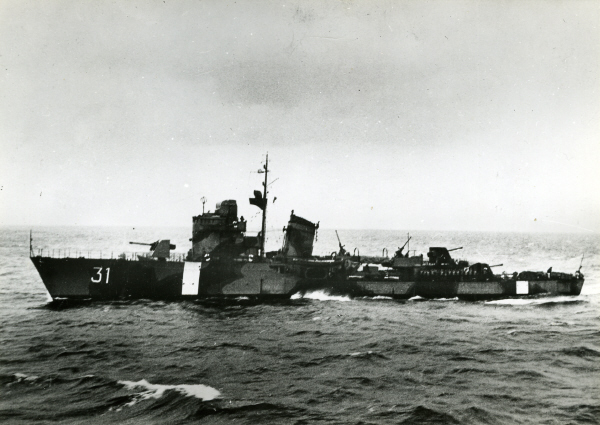
- HSwMS Munin

History

Sweden
- Name: Munin
- Namesake: Munin
- Builder: Öresundsvarvet, Landskrona
- Laid down: September 1941
- Launched: 27 May 1942
- Commissioned: 3 January 1943
- Decommissioned: 6 December 1968
- Fate: Sold for scrap 1969

General characteristics
- Class & type: Mode-class destroyer (1942-1953) or frigate (1953-1968)
- Displacement: 960 t (945 long tons), full load; 750 t (740 long tons), standard displacement
- Length: 256 ft (78 m)
- Beam: 26 ft 3 in (8.00 m)
- Draught: 8 ft 10 in (2.69 m)
- Propulsion: 2 oil fired boilers, 2 de Laval steam turbines, 16,000 shp (12,000 kW), 2 screws
- Speed: 30 knots (56 km/h; 35 mph)
- Range: 1,260 nmi (2,330 km; 1,450 mi) at 20 kn (37 km/h; 23 mph)
- Complement: 100
- Armament: 3 × 105 mm Bofors K/50 M/42 DP guns (3×1); 2 × Bofors 40 mm L/60 guns K/60 M/36 (2×1); 2 × 20 mm Bofors K/66 M/40 (2×1); 3 × 21 in (533 mm) torpedo tubes (1×3)

HSwMS Munin was a coastal destroyer of the Royal Swedish Navy, built by Öresundsvarvet and launched on 27 May 1942 as the third of the four-ship Mode class. The ship was the only member of the class to be built by Öresundsvarvet in Landskrona. Joining the Coastal Fleet in January 1943, Munin served during World War II and then, after the conflict, visited Belgium, France, Ireland, Norway and the United Kingdom in 1946 and 1947. In 1953, the vessel was upgraded with enhanced anti-submarine armament, being re-rated a frigate. After twenty-five years service, the ship was decommissioned on 6 December 1968 and sold for scrap the following year.

== Design ==
Munin was a Swedish destroyer based on the Spica class designed in Italy. Small and ideal for coastal operation, the design was a cheaper alternative to traditional designs to meet the requirements of the rapidly expanding Swedish Navy. The class was named after things related to Thor beginning with the letter M, Munin being one of his ravens. Displacement was 750 tonnes (740 long tons) standard and 960 tonnes (940 long tons) full load. Overall length was 256 feet (78.03 m), beam 26 ft 3 in (8.00 m) and draught 8 ft 10 in (2.69 m). A crew of 100 officers and ratings was carried.

Machinery consisted of two Penhoët A oil-fired boilers, which supplied steam to two de Laval geared steam turbines, each driving its own propeller. The turbines were rated at 16,000 shp (12,000 kW) to give a design speed of 30 knots (56 km/h; 35 mph). 190 tonnes (190 long tons) of fuel was carried to give a range of 1,260 nautical miles (2,330 km; 1,450 mi) at 20 knots (37 km/h; 23 mph).

The main armament consisted of three 10.5 cm (4 in) K/50 M42 guns produced by Bofors. These were placed in separate mounts, one on the fore deck, one on the aft deck and one on the aft superstructure. Air defence consisted two 40 mm (1.57 in) K/60 M36 and two 20 mm (0.79 in) K/66 M40 individually mounted anti-aircraft autocannons, also provided by Bofors. Three torpedo tubes for 53 cm (21 in) torpedoes were triple mounted aft of the superstructure and two depth charge throwers were mounted further towards the stern. 42 mines could also be carried for minelaying.

== Service ==
Munin was laid down by Öresundsvarvet in Landskrona in September 1941, the only member of the class to be constructed at the yard. Launched on 27 May 1942, the vessel was commissioned on 3 January the following year and delivered to the Navy five days later, serving with the Coastal Fleet through World War II. The ship was allocated the pennant number 31.

After the War, Munin took part in two goodwill tours to other European nations. In 1946, the vessel accompanied the cruiser Fylgia and destroyer Mjölner on a tour of Bergen and Fannefjord in Norway, Dublin in Ireland and Antwerp in Belgium. The following year, the ship accompanied the cruiser Gotland and lead ship of the class Mode on a trip to France and the United Kingdom. The fleet visited Le Havre, Lyme Bay, Torquay, Glasgow and Oban.

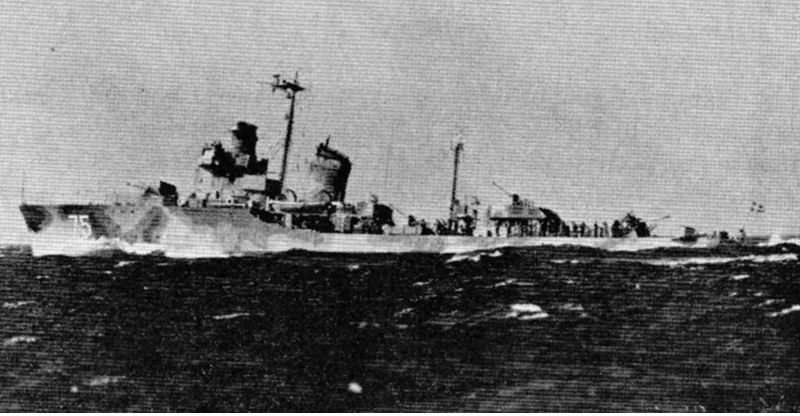
Munin after conversion

== Modernisation ==
Munin was modernised in 1953 and re-rated as a frigate. One of the 105 mm (4.1 in) main guns was removed, along with the triple 533 mm (21 in) torpedo tubes. Instead a single Squid depth charge launcher was fitted to improve anti-submarine capabilities and the 40 mm (1.6 in) guns were upgraded to provide greater anti-aircraft protection. After the conversion, Munin retained minelaying capability. The upgraded ship was allocated the pennant number 75.

== Disposal ==
Munin was decommissioned on 6 December 1968 and was sold for scrap in Gothenburg the following year.
