= HSwMS Mjölner (32) =

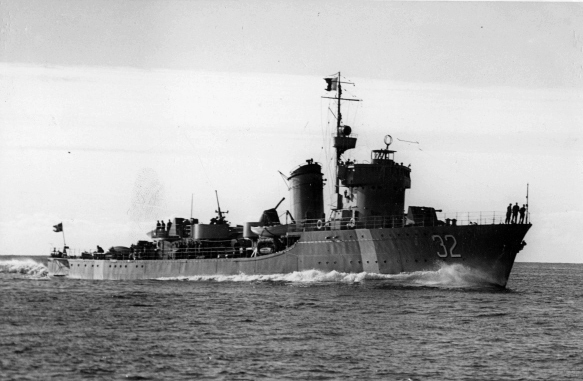
- HSwMS Mjölner

History

Sweden
- Name: Mjölner
- Namesake: Thor's hammer, Mjölner
- Builder: Eriksbergs Mekaniska Verkstad, Gothenburg
- Laid down: September 1941
- Launched: 9 April 1942
- Commissioned: 12 November 1943
- Decommissioned: 1 April 1966
- Fate: Sold for scrap 1969

General characteristics
- Class & type: Mode-class destroyer (1942–1953) or frigate (1953–1970)
- Displacement: 960 t (945 long tons), full load; 750 t (740 long tons), standard displacement
- Length: 256 ft (78 m)
- Beam: 26 ft 3 in (8.00 m)
- Draught: 8 ft 10 in (2.69 m)
- Propulsion: 2 oil fired boilers, 2 de Laval steam turbines, 16,000 shp (12,000 kW), 2 screws
- Speed: 30 knots (56 km/h; 35 mph)
- Range: 1,260 nmi (2,330 km; 1,450 mi) at 20 kn (37 km/h; 23 mph)
- Complement: 100
- Armament: 3 × 105 mm Bofors K/50 M/42 DP guns (3×1); 2 × Bofors 40 mm L/60 guns K/60 M/36 (2×1); 2 × 20 mm Bofors K/66 M/40 (2×1); 3 × 21 in (533 mm) torpedo tubes (1×3)

HSwMS Mjölner was a coastal destroyer of the Royal Swedish Navy, built by Eriksbergs Mekaniska Verkstad and launched on 9 April 1942 as the last of the four ship Mode class. After serving during World War II, the ship was updated and reclassified a frigate in 1953. Decommissioned in 1966, Mjölner was sold for scrap in 1969.

== Design and development ==
Mjölner was based on the design the Spica class designed in Italy. Small and designed for coastal operation, the vessel was named after Thor's hammer, Mjölner.

Displacement was 750 tonnes (740 long tons) standard and 960 tonnes (940 long tons) full load. Overall length was 256 feet (78.03 m), beam 26 ft 3 in (8.00 m) and draught 8 ft 10 in (2.69 m). A crew of 100 officers and ratings was carried.

Machinery consisted of two Penhoët A oil-fired boilers, which supplied steam to two de Laval geared steam turbines, each driving its own propeller. The turbines were rated at 16,000 shp (12,000 kW) to give a design speed of 30 knots (56 km/h; 35 mph). 190 tonnes (190 long tons) of fuel was carried to give a range of 1,260 nautical miles (2,330 km; 1,450 mi) at 20 knots (37 km/h; 23 mph).

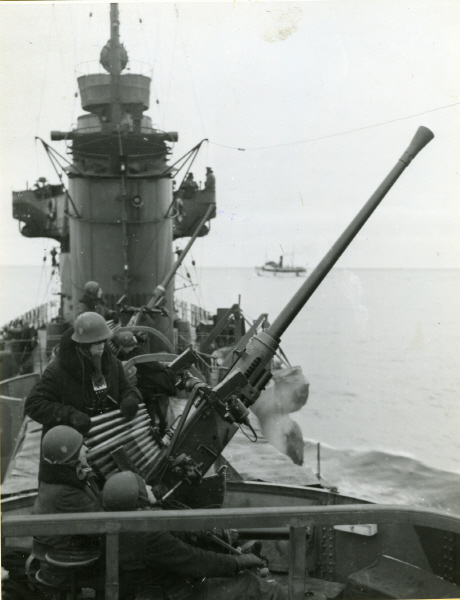
Anti aircraft gun onboard Mjölner

The main armament consisted of three 10.5 cm (4 in) K/50 M42 guns produced by Bofors. These were placed in separate mounts, one on the fore deck, one on the aft deck and one on the aft superstructure. Air defence consisted two 40 mm (1.57 in) K/60 M36 and two 20 mm (0.79 in) K/66 M40 individually mounted anti-aircraft autocannons, also provided by Bofors. Three torpedo tubes for 53 cm (21 in) torpedoes were triple mounted aft of the superstructure and two depth charge throwers were mounted further towards the stern. 42 mines could also be carried for minelaying.

== Construction and service ==
Mjölner was laid down by Eriksbergs Mekaniska Verkstad in Gothenburg in September 1941. The vessel was launched on 9 April 1942 and commissioned on 12 November 1943, serving with the Coastal Fleet through World War II. The ship was allocated the pennant number 32.

In 1946, Mjölner accompanied Fylgia and Munin on a tour of Bergen and Fannefjord in Norway, Dublin in Ireland and Antwerp in Belgium.

=== Modernisation ===
Mjölner was modernised in 1953 and re-rated as a frigate. One of the 105 mm (4.1 in) main guns was removed, along with the triple 533 mm (21 in) torpedo tubes. A single Squid depth charge launcher was fitted to improve anti-submarine capabilities and the 40 mm (1.6 in) guns were upgraded.

After the conversion, Mode retained minelaying capability. The upgraded ship was allocated the pennant number 73.

=== Disposal ===
Mjölner was decommissioned on 1 April 1966 and sold for scrap on 3 November 1969.
