= HSwMS Gotland (1933) =

Swedish cruiser

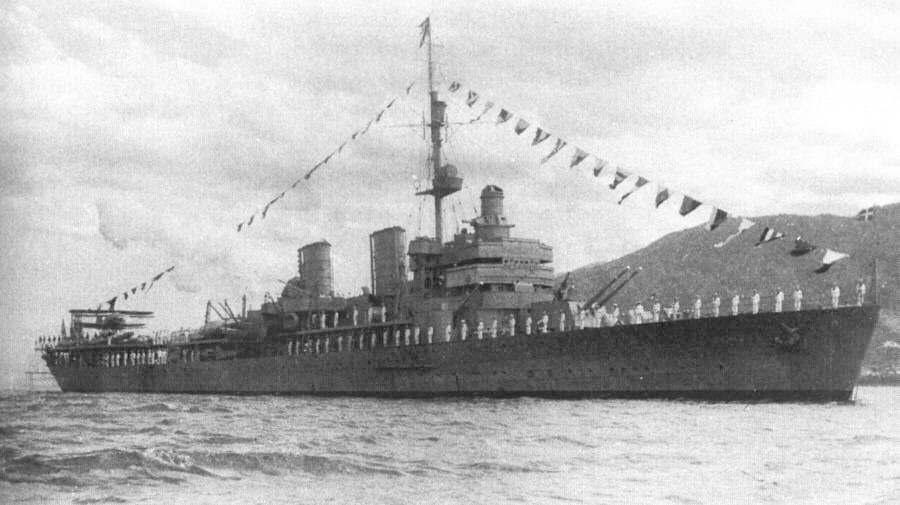
- Gotland in 1936

History

Sweden
- Name: Gotland
- Ordered: 7 June 1930
- Builder: Götaverken, Gothenburg
- Laid down: 1930
- Launched: 14 September 1933
- Commissioned: 14 December 1934
- Decommissioned: 1956
- Stricken: 1 July 1960
- Fate: Sold for scrap, 1962
- Badge

General characteristics (as built)
- Type: Aircraft cruiser
- Displacement: 4,750 t (4,670 long tons) (standard)
- Length: 134.8 m (442 ft 3 in)
- Beam: 15.4 m (50 ft 6 in)
- Draught: 5.5 m (18 ft 1 in)
- Installed power: 4 boilers; 33,000 shp (25,000 kW)
- Propulsion: 2 shafts; 2 steam turbines
- Speed: 27.5 knots (50.9 km/h; 31.6 mph)
- Range: 4,000 nmi (7,400 km; 4,600 mi) at 12 knots (22 km/h; 14 mph)
- Complement: 467
- Armament: 2 × twin, 2 × single 152 mm (6 in) guns; 1 × twin, 2 × single 75 mm (3 in) AA guns; 4 × single 25 mm (1 in) AA guns; 2 × triple 533 mm (21 in) torpedo tubes; 80–100 Mines
- Armour: Deck: 51 mm (2.0 in); Gun turrets: 29–51 mm (1.1–2.0 in)
- Aircraft carried: 6 Hawker Osprey floatplanes
- Aviation facilities: 1 catapult

HSwMS Gotland was an aircraft cruiser built for the Royal Swedish Navy during the 1930s. Completed in 1934, she was assigned to the Coastal Fleet and also served as a training ship for naval cadets in foreign waters until the beginning of World War II in 1939. During the war the ship conducted neutrality patrols and continued to serve as a training ship. Gotland was converted into an anti-aircraft cruiser in 1943–1944 as her floatplanes were obsolete and modern replacements could not be purchased. After the war ended in 1945, she became a dedicated training ship and resumed making lengthy foreign cruises with cadets.

The ship was converted into a fighter-direction ship in 1953–1954. Gotland made one final training cruise in 1955–1956 and was reduced to reserve later that year. She was stricken from the navy list in 1960 and sold for scrap in 1962.

== Background and description ==
The Royal Swedish Navy set up a committee to assess the types of ships that the Navy would need in the future in 1925. The committee delivered its conclusions in December 1926 which included a seaplane carrier armed with six 152-millimetre (6 in) guns in single mounts with room for twelve aircraft in a hangar. Another conclusion was that all warships should be capable of laying naval mines. The Naval Construction Board decided that it wanted the ship to be able to function as a cruiser as well as operating as a seaplane carrier. It specified that the guns should be in twin-gun turrets, additional heavy anti-aircraft (AA) guns should be added and the ship should carry six 533-millimetre (21 in) torpedo tubes. The resulting 5,000-long-ton (5,100 t) design presented in January 1927 proved impossible to build within the available budget of Sk16.5 million that had been approved by the Riksdag on 13 May. The design was then reduced in size, requiring one of the forward turrets be removed. Its guns were then placed in casemates either side of the superstructure, a feature otherwise found only in the American Omaha-class cruisers.

Gotland had an overall length of 134.8 metres (442 ft 3 in), a beam of 15.4 metres (50 ft 6 in) and a draught of 5.5 metres (18 ft 1 in). The ship displaced 4,750 long tons (4,830 t) at standard load and 5,550 long tons (5,639 t) at deep load. The ship's propulsion machinery was arranged in units so that a single torpedo hit could not immobilize the ship, although the presence of the aft main-gun turret's magazine between the rear boiler room and its associated engine room complicated things. Four Penhoët boilers fed steam at a pressure of 285 psi (1,965 kPa; 20 kgf/cm^{2}) to a pair of de Laval geared steam turbines that each drove a single propeller shaft. The engines were rated at a total of 33,000 shaft horsepower (25,000 kW) designed to give her a speed of 27.5 knots (50.9 km/h; 31.6 mph). During her sea trials on 14 September 1934, the ship reached a speed of 27.53 knots (50.99 km/h; 31.68 mph) from 32,768 shp (24,435 kW). Gotland carried up to 800 long tons (810 t) of fuel oil that gave her a range of 4,000 nautical miles (7,400 km; 4,600 mi) at a speed of 12 knots (22 km/h; 14 mph). The ship had a complement of 467 officers and ratings.

=== Armament ===
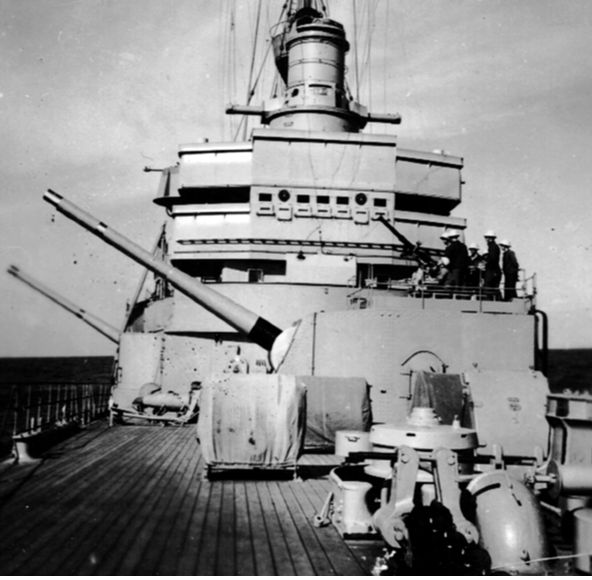
A view of Gotland's forward superstructure and armament taken from the bow, 1939

The cruiser's main battery consisted of six 55-calibre, Bofors 152 mm M/30 guns. Four of these were mounted in two twin-gun turrets, one each forward and aft of the superstructure; each turret had a maximum elevation of 60 degrees to give it to give it some utility for anti-aircraft work. The other two guns were mounted in casemates on the corners of the forward superstructure with a maximum elevation of 30 degrees. The guns had a rate of fire of six rounds per minute. They fired 46-kilogram (101 lb) shells with a muzzle velocity of 900 m/s (3,000 ft/s); this gave the turreted guns a maximum range of 24,400 metres (26,700 yd) and the casemated guns a range of 20,000 metres (22,000 yd). Targeting data for the guns was collected by 6-metre (19 ft 8 in) rangefinders in the fire-control director on the roof of the bridge and in the aft turret.

Anti-aircraft defence was provided by four 60-caliber, 75-millimetre (3 in) Bofors M/26 or M/28 AA guns. Two single guns were situated on platforms between the funnels and a twin-gun mount superfired over the rear 152 mm turret. The guns had a muzzle velocity of 850 m/s (2,800 ft/s) when firing their 6.5-kilogram (14 lb) shells to their maximum range of 15,000 metres (16,000 yd). The ship was also equipped with four 64-calibre, Bofors 25-millimetre (1 in) M/32 AA guns in single mounts located on the sides of the forward superstructure. These guns fired 0.25-kilogram (0.55 lb) projectiles at 850 m/s with an effective range of 1,000 to 2,000 metres (1,100 to 2,200 yd). Two 4-metre (13 ft 1 in) rangefinders, one on each broadside in the forward superstructure, provided data for the AA guns. Gotland was fitted with two triple rotating mounts for 533 mm torpedo tubes abreast the aft funnel. She was also equipped with rails to lay 80–100 mines, depending on size.

=== Protection and aviation facilities ===
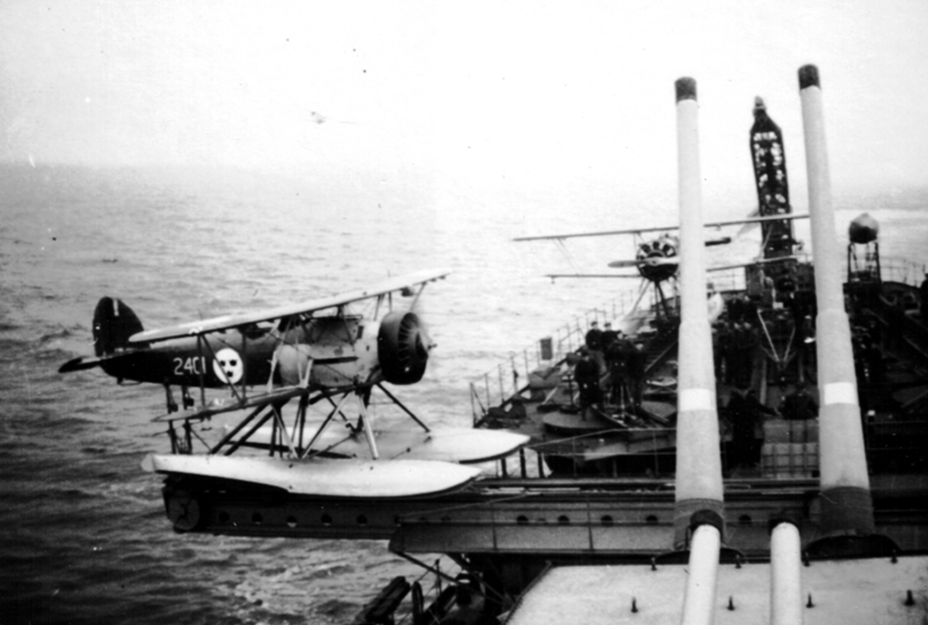
A Hawker Osprey S 9 floatplane, ready for launch on the ship's catapult

The deck and conning tower armour consisted of chrome-nickel steel plates 51 mm (2 in) thick. The protection of the main gun turrets ranged from 29 mm (1.1 in) to 51 mm in thickness as did the armour protecting the transverse bulkheads. The boiler uptakes were fitted with armour plates 29 mm thick while the ammunition hoists were protected by 25 to 29 mm armour. (Note: Naval historian Michael J. Whitley states that the thickness of Gotland's armour was about half that given in the other sources with a maximum of 25 millimetres and a minimum of 13 millimetres (0.51 in).)

Gotland's aircraft complement consisted of six Hawker Osprey floatplanes, although the ship's aircraft deck had the capacity to handle eight aircraft and three more could be stowed below deck. The aircraft were found to suffer from wave damage during rough weather. The aircraft deck was equipped with eight electric trolleys to move the aircraft to the Heinkel compressed-air catapult. This was 14 metres (45 ft 11 in) long when folded, but extended to 22 metres (72 ft 2 in) when in use. It could launch the Ospreys once every two minutes. The aircraft were lifted onto the ship by a crane at the stern. Gotland could only recover the Ospreys while stationary and in a calm sea unless it trailed a sail off the stern that calmed the water so the floatplanes could taxi onto it, close enough that the crane could reach it.

=== Modifications ===
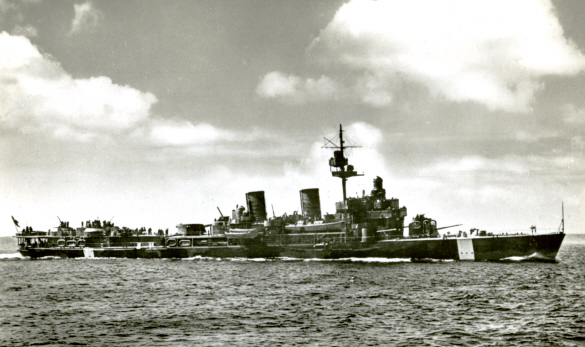
Broadside view of Gotland after her conversion into an anti-aircraft cruiser, July 1944

In 1936–1937 a twin-gun mount for the 25 mm M/32 AA gun was installed on the roof of the forward main-gun turret. By 1943, the Ospreys were worn out, and Sweden could not afford to design and build more modern replacements. Furthermore, aircraft performance had greatly improved since the Ospreys had been designed in the early 1930s and land-based aircraft were now easily capable of covering the entire Baltic Sea. Gotland was therefore converted in 1943–1944 to an anti-aircraft cruiser. This involved the removal of the catapult, aircraft-handling gear and crane; the aircraft deck was extended forward to cover the area where the catapult had been. Four twin-gun mounts for 56-calibre 40 mm (1.6 in) M/36 AA guns were installed on the former aircraft deck. The two forward mounts were positioned on the broadside while the two aft mounts were located on the centreline. The gun fired 0.89 kg (2.0 lb) shells at a muzzle velocity of 881 m/s (2,890 ft/s); the maximum range was 9,830 m (10,750 yd) although the effective range was considerably less. Between the 40 mm guns and the aft 152 mm gun turret, a pair of twin-gun mounts for 70-calibre 20 mm (1 in) M40 AA guns were positioned, also positioned on each broadside. These changes reduced her complement to 543.

In 1953–1954 Gotland was modified as a fighter-direction ship to serve as a mobile fighter-control center. To this end she was fitted with a British Type 293 early-warning radar. Her anti-aircraft suite was upgraded as all of her 75 mm, 25 mm and 20 mm guns were removed, except for the twin-gun M32 mount on the forward turret, and she received five single 70-calibre 40 mm M48 guns in their place. The existing M36 40 mm guns were also exchanged for M48 models. Several British Type 262 gunnery radars were added to control the light AA guns. To compensate for the additional weight, the casemated 152 mm guns and the 4-metre rangefinders were removed. The ship also received a British Type 144 ASDIC system. These changes reduced her crew size to 401 officers and ratings.

== Construction and career ==
Gotland was ordered on 7 June 1930 from Götaverken, which subcontracted the ship's hull and propulsion machinery to Lindholmens. The ship was laid down at the latter company's shipyard in Gothenburg later that year, launched on 14 September 1933 and commissioned on 5 December 1934. She then became the flagship of the Coastal Fleet's Scouting Squadron. Gotland began serving as a cadet training ship during the cold-weather months beginning in 1935, although she continued to serve with the Coastal Fleet for the rest of the year. The ship made her first foreign voyage from 8 December 1935 to 15 March 1936, visiting Germany, Spain, Portugal, Britain and the Netherlands. Subsequent trips, sometimes running as long as November to April, visited ports in French West Africa, South America, the Caribbean, and Norway. The cruiser's last foreign tour before the beginning of World War II in September 1939 was a short one in June-July of that year during which the ship made port visits in France, Britain and Norway.

Gotland continued to serve with the Coastal Fleet conducting neutrality patrols during the war while also continuing to train cadets. When the Germans invaded Norway and Denmark (Operation Weserübung) on 9 April 1940, the ship was being overhauled in the Naval Shipyard in Stockholm. In May 1941, Swedish Air Force reconnaissance aircraft sighted the German battleship Bismarck and the heavy cruiser Prinz Eugen as they passed through the Kattegat; the cruiser Gotland, engaged in a gunnery exercise, subsequently confirmed the sighting and tracked the German ships for several hours. Both sightings were reported to Royal Swedish Navy headquarters. The naval report was later leaked to the British naval attaché in Stockholm, who forwarded it to the British Admiralty, triggering the Battle of the Denmark Strait and the pursuit of the battleship. From late 1943 to April 1944, Gotland was converted into an anti-aircraft cruiser.

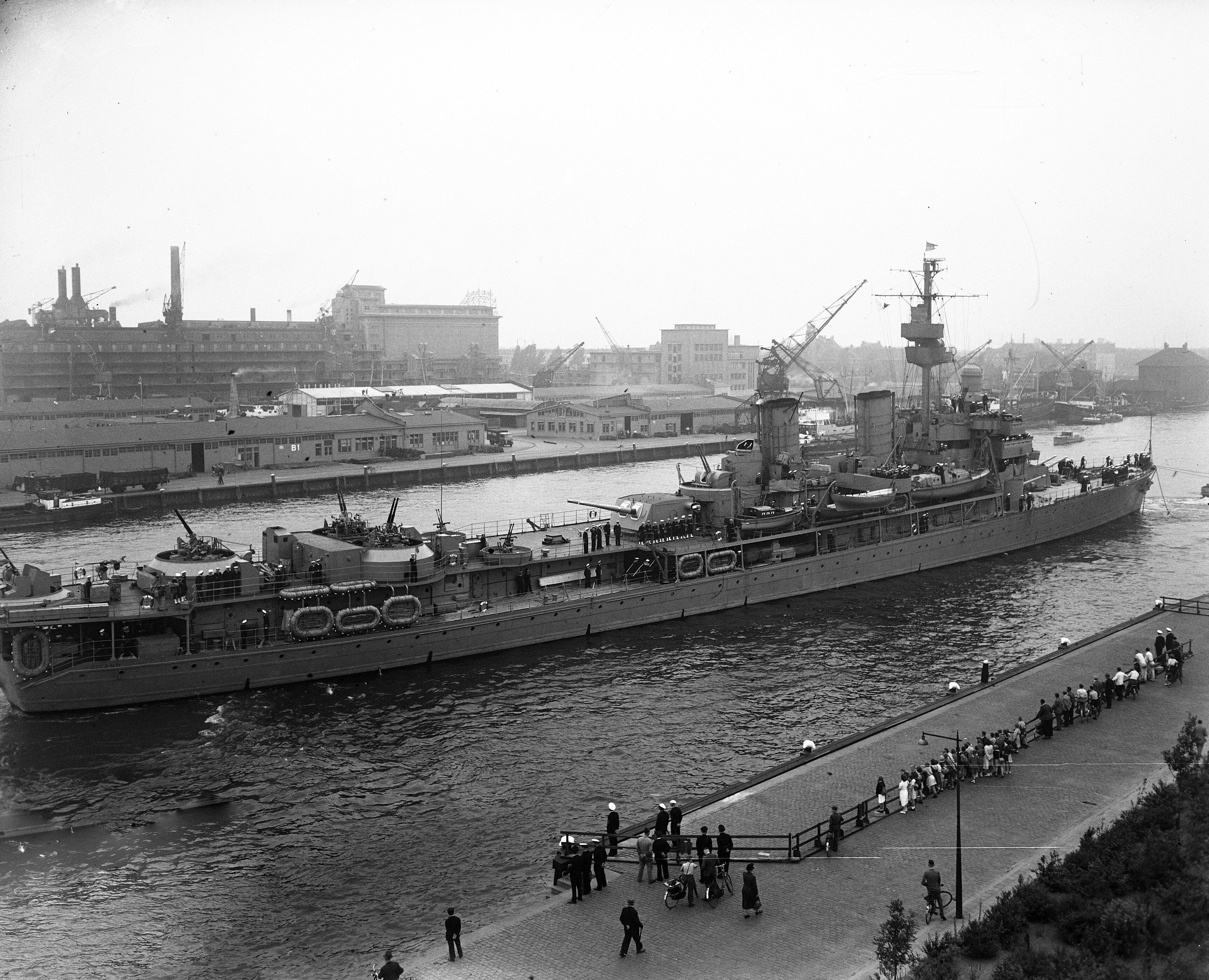
Gotland during a port visit to Rotterdam, Netherlands, 8 June 1950

After the war the ship served as the flagship of the Naval War School Department and resumed making cadet cruises during the cold-weather months. In addition to the pre-war destinations, she also visited various ports in the Mediterranean, British Kenya, South Africa and North America. Escorted by the destroyers Mode and Munin, Gotland made a trip to France and the United Kingdom from 29 April to 11 June 1947 where they visited Le Havre, Lyme Bay, Torquay, Glasgow and Oban. The ship also transported cadets to the annual Nordic Naval Cadet Meeting where they trained with minesweepers in 1949–1952. In that last year, Gotland was accompanied by the destroyer Stockholm. The cruiser and the destroyers Norrköping and Karlskrona escorted a group of minesweepers to Tønsberg, Norway, and Antwerp, Belgium, from 24 May to 12 June 1953.

After Gotland's conversion to a fighter-control ship in 1953–1954, the ship only made a single foreign cruise when she made port visits in Spain, West Africa, Portuguese Angola, France and Britain from 13 December 1955 to 14 March 1956. She was reduced to reserve later that year and stricken from the navy list on 1 July 1960. Gotland was sold for scrap on 1 April 1962 and broken up at Ystad, Sweden, the next year.

== Bibliography ==
- Anderson, R. M. (1977). "Re: Gotland". Warship International. XIV (2): 97. ISSN 0043-0374.
- Borgenstam, Curt; Insulander, Per & Åhlund, Bertil (1993), Kryssare: med svenska flottans kryssare under 75 år [Cruisers: With the Swedish Navy's Cruisers under 75 Years], CB Marinlitteratur, ISBN 91-970700-6-8
- Campbell, John (1985). Naval Weapons of World War II. Annapolis, Maryland: Naval Institute Press. ISBN 0-87021-459-4.
- Fisher, Edward C. Jr. & Gard, Bertil (1976). "The Three Faces of Gotland". Warship International. XIII (3): 193–208. ISSN 0043-0374.
- von Hofsten, Gustaf; Waernberg, Jan & Ohlsson, Curt S. (2003). Örlogsfartyg: svenska maskindrivna fartyg under tretungad flagg [Ships of War: Swedish Machine-powered Ships under the Triple-tailed Flag]. Forum navales skriftserie, 1650-1837 (in Swedish). Vol. 6. Svenskt militärhistoriskt bibl. i samarbete med Marinlitteratur. ISBN 91-974384-3-X. SELIBR 8873330.
- Lagvall, Bertil (1991), Flottans Neutralitetsvakt 1939-1945 [Chronicle of the Fleet Neutrality Watch 1939-1945], Karlskrona: Marinlitteraturföreningen nr 71, ISBN 91-85944-04-1
- Layman, R. D. & McLaughlin, Stephen (1991). The Hybrid Warship: The Amalgamation of Big Guns and Aircraft. Annapolis, Maryland: Naval Institute Press. ISBN 1-55750-374-5.
- Preston, Antony (2002). The World's Worst Warships. London: Conway Maritime Press. ISBN 0-85177-754-6.
- Westerlund, Karl-Erik (1977). "Re: The HMS Gotland". Warship International. XIV (2): 96–97. ISSN 0043-0374.
- Westerlund, Karl-Eric (1980). "Sweden". In Chesneau, Roger (ed.). Conway's All the World's Fighting Ships 1922–1946. New York: Mayflower Books. pp. 368–377. ISBN 0-8317-0303-2.
- Whitley, M. J. (1995). Cruisers of World War Two: An International Encyclopedia. Annapolis, Maryland: Naval Institute Press. ISBN 1-55750-141-6.
