= Kashtan (disambiguation) =

Kashtan is a surname.

In Russian, the word Kashtan (Каштан) means "chestnut" and it may also refer to:

- 1P78 Kashtan, Russian military telescopic sight
- AEK-919K Kashtan, Russian submachine gun
- CADS-N-1 Kashtan, Russian naval air defence gun-missile system
- Kashtan-class salvage vessel, class of salvage vessel/submersible support built in East Germany for the Soviet Navy

== See also ==
- Kashtanka
- Kashtanov
