= Kazhdan =

Kazhdan, also written as Kajdan, Kazdan, Každan, is a Jewish surname. Notable people with the surname include:

- Alexander Kazhdan - historian, byzantinist
- David Kazhdan - mathematician.
- Jerry Kazdan - mathematician

== See also ==
- Kasdan
- Kashtan
