= Kashtanov =

Kashtanov, feminine: Kashtanova is a Russian surname. Notable people with the surname include:

- Aleksandr Kashtanov
- Aleksei Kashtanov
- Kris Kashtanova
- Stanyslav Kashtanov

== See also ==
- Kashtan
- Kashtanova (Kyiv Light Rail)
