= Kasdan =

Kasdan is a surname. Notable people with the surname include:

- Jake Kasdan (born 1974), American actor, film director, and screenwriter
- Jon Kasdan (born 1979), American actor and film director
- Lawrence Kasdan (born 1949), American film director, producer, and screenwriter
- Mark Kasdan (born 1941), American screenwriter and film producer
- Meg Kasdan, American actress and screenwriter
- Ruth Kasdan (1918–2008), Swedish actress and singer

== See also ==
- Kazhdan
- Aniq Kasdan (born 2002), Malaysian weightlifter, Kasdan is a patronymic
