= Aleksandr Kashtanov =

Russian agronomist and politician (1928–2022)

Member of the Supreme Soviet of the Russian SFSR
- In office 1971–1980

Personal details
- Born: Aleksandr Nikolayevich Kashtanov; 25 March 1928 Yurasovo, Bronnitsky Uyezd, Moscow Governorate, RSFSR, Soviet Union
- Died: 8 February 2022 (aged 93)
- Party: CPSU
- Education: Russian State Agrarian University – Moscow Timiryazev Agricultural Academy
- Occupation: Agronomist

Aleksandr Nikolayevich Kashtanov (Russian: Алекса́ндр Никола́евич Кашта́нов; 25 March 1928 – 8 February 2022) was a Soviet and Russian agronomist and politician.

A member of the Communist Party, he served on the Supreme Soviet of the Russian SFSR from 1971 to 1980. He died on 8 February 2022, at the age of 93.
