= AEK-919K Kashtan =

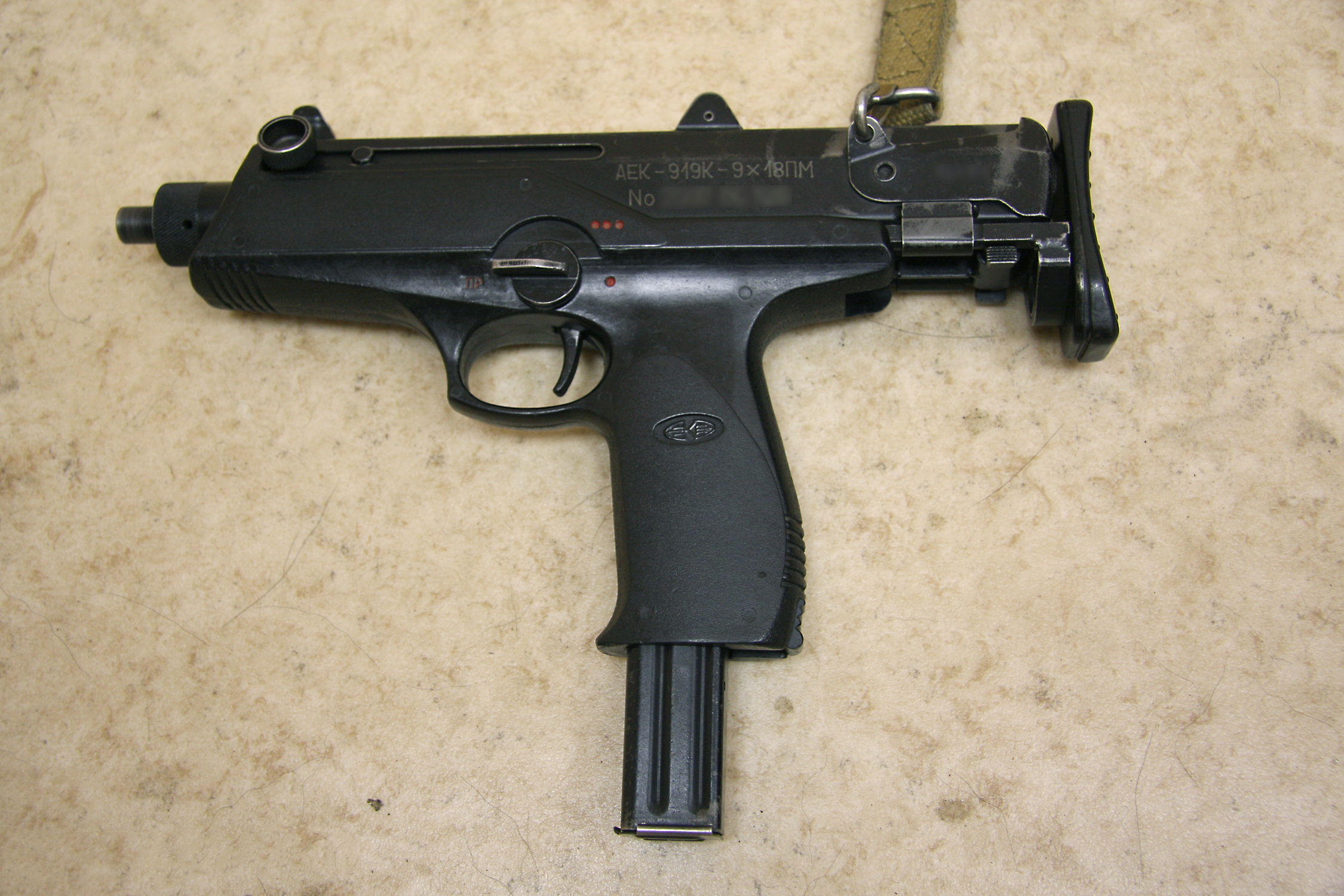
- Type: Submachine gun

Service history
- In service: 1995-present
- Used by: Russia
- Wars: First Chechen war

Production history
- Designer: Pavel Sedov
- Designed: 1994
- Manufacturer: Kovrov Mechanical Plant
- Developed from: Steyr MPi 69

Specifications
- Mass: 1.78 kg (without ammo)
- Length: 485mm with stock extended
- Cartridge: 9x18 Makarov
- Action: simple blowback
- Rate of fire: 900
- Muzzle velocity: 315 m/s
- Effective firing range: 100 m
- Feed system: 20 or 30 round magazine

The AEK-919K Kashtan (Russian: Каштан; lit Chestnut) is a Russian submachine gun developed in the mid-1990s by employees of the Kovrov Mechanical Plant Design Bureau (lead designer Pavel Sedov, scientific supervisor Mikhail Tarasov, with the support of Stanislav Koksharov, head of the Design Bureau).

The Austrian Steyr MPi-69 submachine gun was used as a model; moreover, the first samples of the submachine gun practically did not differ from the Austrian prototype in appearance. However, after the release of the experimental batch of AEK-919, shortcomings were discovered, after which changes were made to the basic design. The updated sample received the AEK-919K index. Kashtan was offered as a weapon for certain categories of military personnel (crews of aircraft and combat vehicles), as well as special forces of law enforcement agencies.

== Design ==
The weapon operates by blowback. To reduce the weapon's size, a bolt hugging the barrel is used, enclosing the barrel from above and on the sides (similar to pistols). The cocking handle is located on the left side of the receiver. The lower part of the receiver and the weapon's frame are made of glass-filled polyamide. The upper part of the receiver is stamped from sheet steel. The barrel has polygonal rifling and is separated from the weapon during disassembly. The trigger mechanism provides the ability to conduct single-shot and automatic fire. The shot is fired from the rear sear. The box magazine is staggered and double fed. The magazine well is located in the pistol grip. To improve the stability of the weapon during firing, it has a buttstock with a rotating butt plate, which is retracted into the receiver when stowed. Open sights include a front sight and a rear sight. Provision is made for installing a laser designator or a collimator sight. For special missions, the submachine gun can be equipped with a PMS tactical suppressor.

As of February 2004, the AEK-919K had successfully passed comprehensive military weapons testing according to Russian Ministry of Defense methodology. In late 2006, due to the liquidation of the Special Design Bureau and the repurposing of the plant, production of the AEK-919K submachine gun ceased.

As of 2013, it remained on the list of products of the Degtyarev Plant.

== Variants ==
- AEK-919 - prototype chambered for the 9x18mm cartridge, produced in a small batch (approximately 100 units). It features a push-button safety catch, slightly bigger length, heavier weight, and the shape of the upper receiver (it is square in cross-section, while the more compact AEK-919K "Kashtan" has rounded corners).
- AEK-919K - serial production version.
- AEK-918 - prototype chambered for the domestic 9x19mm 7N21 and 7N31 cartridges, developed in 2000.
- AEK-918v is a prototype chambered for the 9x19mm Parabellum cartridge and fed by a 30-round sector magazine.

== Users ==
- Russia - The first combat use of the AEK-919K was recorded in the spring of 1995 by a special forces unit of the Russian FSB (which received a batch of 100 submachine guns) during the First Chechen war. In 2002, the crews of Ka-50 "Black Shark" helicopters operating in the combat zone of Chechnya and Dagestan were armed with AEK-919K pistols. In 2003, the AEK-919K submachine guns were officially adopted by the Federal Bailiff Service. As of October 2006, the AEK-919K was used by individual units of the Russian Ministry of Internal Affairs, the Federal Protective Service, the Federal Security Service, and the Federal Penitentiary Service. As of August 2017, a certain number of AEK-919K remained in service with the employees of the Federal State Unitary Enterprise "Okhrana"
- Kyrgyzstan - is used in the 25th Special Forces Brigade "Scorpion" of the Armed Forces of Kyrgyzstan.
