= Kashtan =

Kashtan is a surname. Notable people with the surname include:

- Dror Kashtan (born 1944), Israeli footballer and manager
- Nikita Kashtan (born 2003), Russian footballer
- William Kashtan (1909–1992), general secretary of the Communist Party of Canada
