= M2 Stinger =

Experimental light machine gun

AN/M2 Stinger
- Type: Light machine gun
- Place of origin: United States

Service history
- In service: 1943–1945 (United States)
- Used by: United States Marine Corps
- Wars: World War II

Production history
- Designer: Milan J. Grevich; John Lyttle
- Designed: 1943
- Manufacturer: G Company, 28th Marine Regiment, 5th Marine Division
- Produced: 1943–1944
- No. built: 6

Specifications
- Mass: 25 pounds (11 kg)
- Length: 40 in (1,020 mm)
- Cartridge: .30-06 Springfield
- Action: Recoil operation
- Rate of fire: 1,200 – 1,350 rpm
- Muzzle velocity: 2,789 ft/s (850 m/s)
- Effective firing range: 1,500 yards (1,371 meters)
- Feed system: 100-round belt

The "Stinger" was a customized field modification of the .30-caliber AN/M2 aircraft machine gun. The Stinger was a man-portable modification of the AN/M2 — primarily mounted by various contemporary US aircraft — to provide additional firepower to a platoon. A handful of these weapons were used during the Pacific Theater of World War II. Nicknamed as such due to its extremely high rate of fire which led to the weapon having "quite a sting", most of the Stinger's fame comes from its use by Medal of Honor awardee Corporal Tony Stein, who used it during the Battle of Iwo Jima to provide covering fire for his platoon mates. While often attributed as Stein's work, the Stinger was actually the brainchild of two marines, namely Sergeant Milan "Mel" J. Grevich and Private First Class John Lyttle.

== History ==
The beginnings of the Stinger go back to at least 1943, where various Marines attempted to convert the AN/M2 aircraft machine gun, known for its very high rate of fire, into something that could be practically fielded in an attempt to provide additional firepower to troops of the time. The first known attempt at doing so was by Pvt. William "Bill" H. Colby of Gloversville, New York as part of the Bougainville Campaign where AN/M2 machine guns were carried ashore and put in fixed firing positions to defend Bougainville Island. What Colby did was rather simple; he simply fitted a bipod onto the muzzle of his AN/M2, ensuring a weapon that could be somewhat practically used on the field even with its awkward spade grips. Colby's creation was used just two days after the start of the campaign when he was ambushed by Japanese soldiers; Colby immediately deployed his modified gun. Being fed .30-06 rounds by assistant gunner Pvt. Edward F. Crumlish, Colby managed to repel the attack. While a decent design, the concept had to be improved, leading to more attempts being made to refine the concept. Two Marines, Sgt. Milan "Mel" J. Grevich and PFC John Lyttle, would later design an improved variation of the concept by taking steps and measures to make the weapon a more man-portable and legitimately usable machine gun; with these modifications, the Stinger was born. Grevich, was later reassigned to the machine gun section of G Company, 28th Marine Regiment, 5th Marine Division after his parachute division was disbanded after the Bougainville Campaign. Disappointed with the performance of his comrades' machine guns, he wanted to produce something that could remedy that; it was at that time when he remembered his Stinger prototype and set about recreating the gun. Grevich recreated six Stingers in total before sailing towards Iwo Jima.

Of the six guns, one was assigned to each of G Company's three rifle platoons, another to the company's demolitions section, and the fifth carried by Grevich. On 19 February 1945, the sixth Stinger was carried by Cpl. Tony Stein from A Company, 28th Marines. Stein used his Stinger to provide covering fire for his platoon mates and purposefully exposed himself to reveal Japanese pillboxes and emplacements. Even though his Stinger was shot out of his hands twice by Japanese gunfire, Stein killed several Japanese infantrymen; he would eventually be killed in action on 1 March 1945 by a Japanese sniper while leading his platoon on a mission to infiltrate a number of pillboxes. He would receive the Medal of Honor posthumously for his actions of 19 February.

After the war, most of the six Stingers were presumably destroyed most likely due to the US Army's adversity to keep stock of nonstandard equipment.

== Design details ==
Essentially a man-portable AN/M2 aircraft machine gun, the Stinger retained most of the characteristics of the AN/M2 but in a more portable package. The Stingers had bipods and rear sights from Browning Automatic Rifles, a shoulder stock cut from an M1 Garand and a rudimentary solenoid trigger mechanism to replace the spade grips as seen on the aircraft AN/M2.

== Replicas ==
A fully-functioning replica of the AN/M2 Stinger was built by Paul Shull with assistance from the Canadian Historical Arms Museum for Shull's show The Weapon Hunter. The weapon was converted from one of two AN/M2s that said museum had on hand. Conversion was said to not have been easy; the whole build took three months from start to finish. Shull used the replica for a shoot for the final episode of the second season of The Weapon Hunter as part of the "Iwo Jima Franken-Gun" segment where he used it to blow apart simulated sandbag emplacements on camera to demonstrate the amount of firepower the Marines had on hand back on Iwo Jima. The replica remains with the Canadian Historical Arms Museum. Another fully-functioning replica was produced by Guiette Mfg., Inc. for the movie Flags of Our Fathers, but the scene where the weapon was used ended up being cut from the final film.
