= List of Swedish military calibers =

After the Swedish name, the international name is shown.

== Calibers for revolvers, pistols and submachine guns ==
- 5.7×33mm
- 7,5 mm m/87, 7.5×23mmR Nagant
- 9 mm m/39, 9×19mm Luger
- 9 mm m/07, 9mm Browning Long
- 11 mm m/71, 11×17mmR
- 11 mm m/40, .45 ACP

== Calibers for carbines, rifles, assault rifles and machine guns under 20 mm ==
- Swedish 5,56 mm ptr 5, 5.56×45mm NATO
- Swedish 6,5 mm m/94, 6.5×55mm Mauser
- 7,62 mm ptr 10, 7.62×51mm NATO
- 8 mm m/39, 7.92×57mm
- 8 mm m/89, 8×58mmR Danish Krag
- 8x63 mm patron m/32, 8×63mm Swedish MG
- 12,7 mm m/40, 12.7×81mmSR Breda
- 12,7 mm m/45, .50 BMG
- 13,2 mm m/39, 13.2×99mm Hotchkiss
