= Kulspruta m/42 =

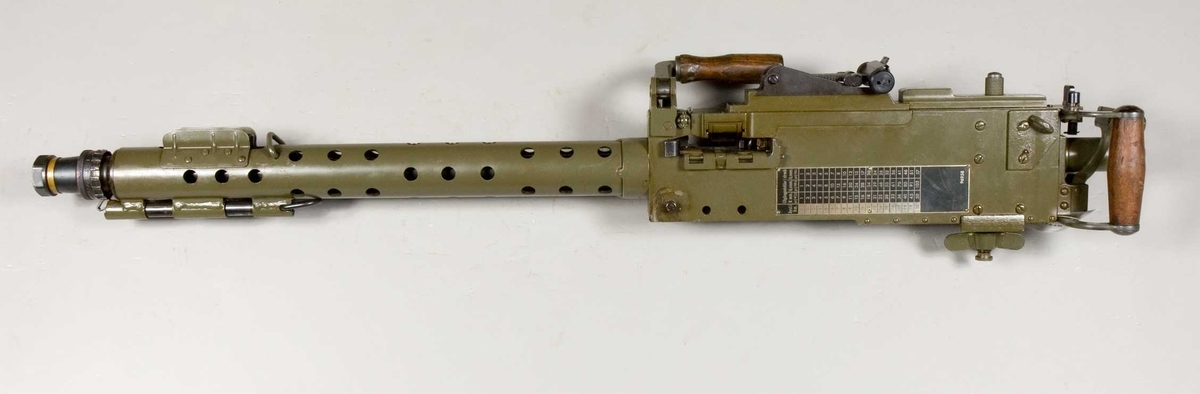
- A Ksp m/42 from the collections of the Swedish Army Museum
- Type: Machine gun
- Place of origin: Sweden

Service history
- In service: 1942–1980s 1980s–Present (Ksp m/39)
- Used by: Sweden
- Wars: Congo Crisis

Production history
- Designer: John Moses Browning
- Designed: 1942
- Manufacturer: Carl Gustafs Stads Gevärsfaktori
- Produced: 1942–1944
- No. built: ≈7600 pieces
- Variants: Ksp m/42 Ksp m/42 (B)

Specifications
- Mass: 16 kg
- Length: 1351 mm
- Barrel length: 607 mm
- Cartridge: 6.5×55mm 8×63mm patron m/32 7.62×51mm NATO
- Action: Recoil
- Rate of fire: 600-720 rounds per minute
- Maximum firing range: 1800 to 2000 m
- Feed system: Belt
- Sights: Iron

Kulspruta m/42 (ksp m/42), Swedish designation for a heavily modified, license-built derivative of the M1919A6 chambered in 6.5×55mm or 8×63mm patron m/32 and from 1975 in 7.62×51mm NATO.

The Ksp m/42B was a lighter version with a distinctive bipod, shoulder stock (used in a similar way as the M1919A6) and a spade grip chambered in 6.5×55mm and later in 7.62×51mm which can be recognised in its corrosion resistant green finish.

It was used by Swedish forces during the Congo Crisis.
