= 8×63mm patron m/32 =

Bottlenecked centerfire cartridge

8×63mm
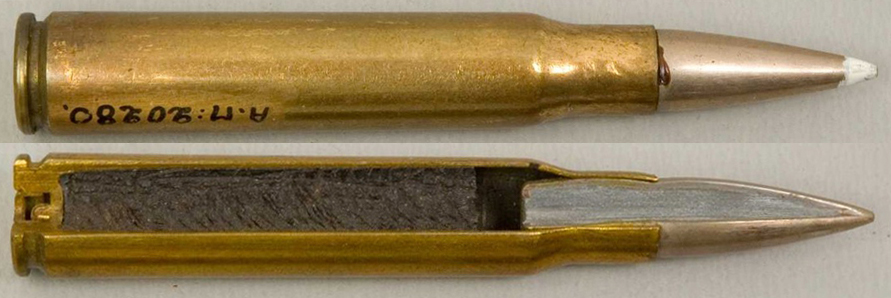
- Two 8×63mm patron m/32 military cartridges
- Type: Rifle
- Place of origin: Sweden

Service history
- In service: 1932–1975
- Used by: Sweden
- Wars: UN intervention in Kongo 1960-1964

Production history
- Designer: Kungliga Armétygförvaltningen (KAF); AktieBolaget Bofors
- Designed: 1927–1932
- Manufacturer: AB Bofors

Specifications
- Case type: Rebated, bottleneck
- Bullet diameter: 8.20 mm (0.323 in)
- Neck diameter: 9.10 mm (0.358 in)
- Shoulder diameter: 11.51 mm (0.453 in)
- Base diameter: 12.43 mm (0.489 in)
- Rim diameter: 12.18 mm (0.480 in)
- Rim thickness: 1.42 mm (0.056 in)
- Case length: 62.81 mm (2.473 in)
- Overall length: 84.62 mm (3.331 in)
- Primer type: Berdan, Large rifle

Ballistic performance
Bullet mass/type	Velocity	Energy
14.2 g (219 gr) m/32 FMJ	760 m/s (2,500 ft/s)	4,101 J (3,025 ft⋅lbf)
- Test barrel length: 609 mm (24 in); Source

The 8×63mm patron m/32 was a bottlenecked centrefire cartridge with a slightly (0.25 mm (0.0098 in)) rebated rim for Swedish heavy and medium machine guns. It was used from 1932 to the finalisation of the re-chambering process of these machine guns to 7.62×51mm NATO in 1975.

== History ==
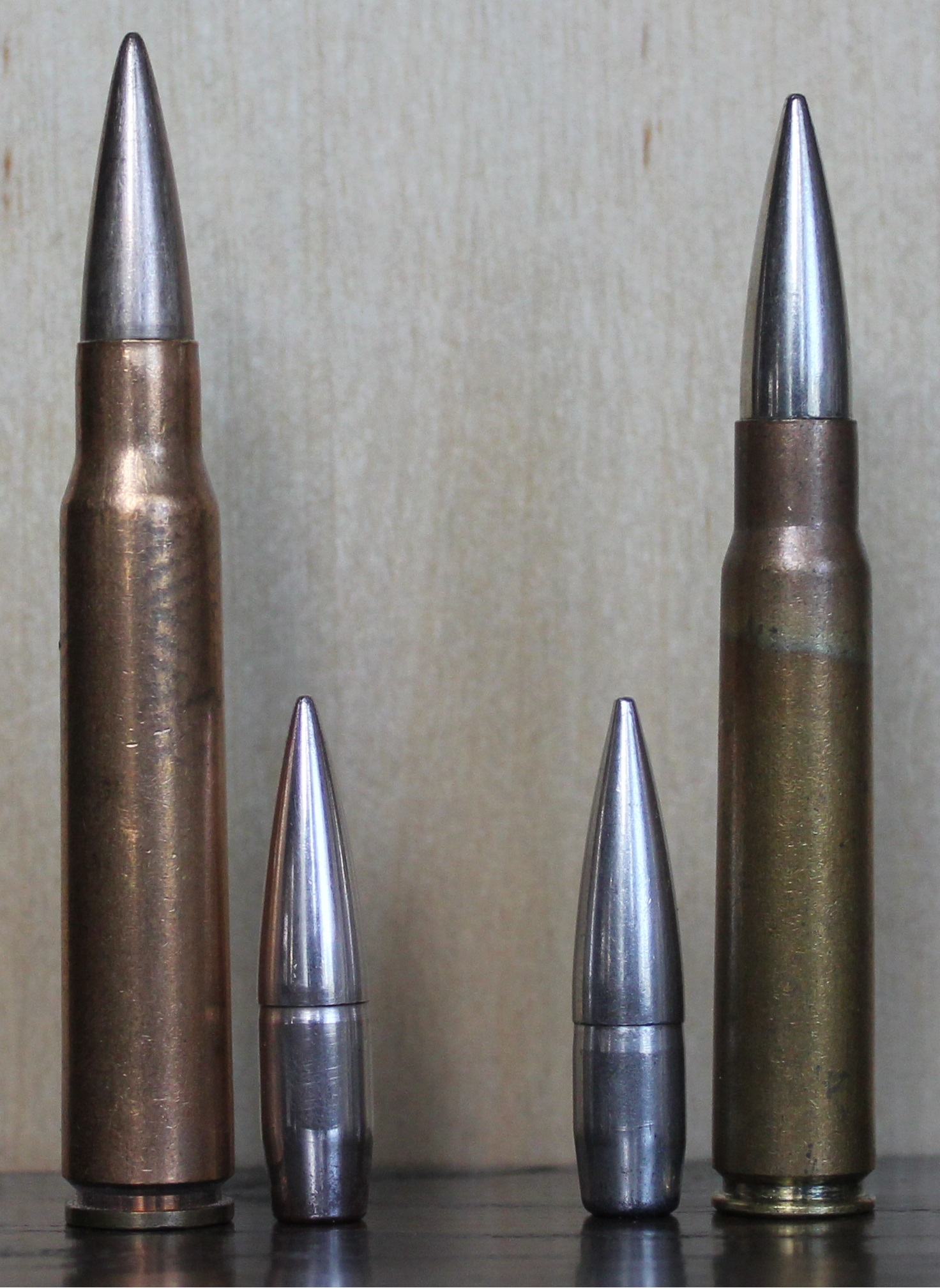
Left; 8×63mm patron m/32 cartridge with 14.2 g (219.1 gr) m/32 bullet Right; 7.92×57mm Mauser cartridge and 11.55 g (178.2 gr) S.m.E. (mild steel cored) 8 mm S bore bullet

Given the experiences of the devastating effect of small arms fire, including the long-range, even indirect fire of the machine guns, in the Russo-Japanese War and World War I, as well as a revolution in terminal ballistic calculations, calibre-related concerns occupied a lot of attention worldwide in military establishments. Sweden was no exception, and series of trials in calibres 6mm-12mm were conducted until the late 1920s. At this time, the standard service cartridge in Swedish use was the 6.5×55mm Swedish skarp patron m/94 projektil m/94 (live cartridge m/94 projectile m/94) service ammunition loaded with a 10.1 grams (156 gr) long round-nosed m/94 (B-projectile) bullet. After study-travels by Lieutenant Colonel de Laval along with Captains Nygren and Holmgren, mainly to Germany and the Netherlands in October 1930, Royal Swedish Army Materiel Administration (Kungliga Armétygförvaltningen (KAF) appointed a commission that conducted a series of tests with calibres 6,5 mm to 7,2 – 7,5 – 7,9 mm, and bullet weights between 8.4 grams and 17.0 grams, with the intention to either recommend a new calibre for the kulspruta m14-29 or retain the 6.5×55mm but with a new boat tailed spitzer bullet, as the old blunt nosed projectile m/94 had inferior ballistics. The commission found that at ranges below 2,400 m (2,625 yd), no recommendation could be given without indepth analysis of intended tasks within the tactical doctrine. Past this, the 14.2 gram bullet in calibre 7.9mm had superior performance in precision and penetration while not causing excessive barrel wear as well as fulfilling the requirement of 20 kilogram-metres impact force up to a range of 3,600 m (3,937 yd). Based on this, KAF tasked AB Bofors to develop and manufacture the larger rifle cartridge to meet these needs.

== Design ==
The patron m/32 round had the same overall length as the .30-06 Springfield cartridge, which allowed it to fit in the standard Browning receiver, but used a larger diameter case and share the 6.5×55mm 12.2 mm (0.48 in) diameter bolt face. Compared to the 1928 pattern .30-06 Springfield M1 Ball the 8×63mm patron m/32 was loaded with 8.20 mm (0.323 in) S bore 14.2 g (219.1 gr) bullets and had more muzzle energy. The 8×63mm patron m/32 had a muzzle velocity of 760 m/s (2,493 ft/s) and an operating pressure of 330 MPa (47,862 psi).

The patron m/32's aerodynamically refined boat tailed spitzer bullet had a useful range of approximately 3,600 m (3,937 yd) on which the impact energy was 20 kilogram-meters (196 J / 145 ft⋅lbf), and a maximum range of approximately 5,500 m (6,015 yd) when fired from a kulspruta m/36. Reverse engineering the trajectory from the previous sentence indicates a ballistic coefficient (G1 BC) of approximately 0.63. Available with armour piercing bullets, patron m/32 was used in the UN-forces' KP-bil during the Congo-crisis against the separatists' armoured cars.

The 8×63mm patron m/32 cartridge was used in the following machine guns:

- Kulspruta m/14-29
- Flygplanskulspruta m/22
- Kulspruta m/36
- Kulspruta m/39
- Kulspruta m/42

The 8×63mm patron m/32 was also used in the gevär / pansarvärnsgevär m/40 bolt-action rifle, Karabiner 98k's re-chambered in Sweden for the patron m/32. Originally purchased as the pvg m/39 in 8×57 IS as a stop-gap anti-tank rifle (despite being unsuited for the role), the re-chambered 8×63 rifles were designated m/40, and later issued to machine gun crews so their rifles would fire the same round as their machine guns. Besides the rechambering a muzzle brake was added necessitated by the additional recoil produced by the more powerful 8×63mm patron m/32 cartridge.

== Military ammunition ==
Designation	Type	Weights (gram)			Propellant type	Projectile material(s)	Muzzle velocity V_{0} or V_{25}	Burning range	Marking	Remarks
Designation	Type	Cartridge	Projectile	Propellant	Propellant type	Projectile material(s)	Muzzle velocity V_{0} or V_{25}	Burning range	Marking	Remarks
8 mm sk ptr m/32	FMJ	32.1 g (495 gr)	14.13 g (218.1 gr)	3.6 g (56 gr)	Kspkr 1/0,55	Lead core, Nickel jacket	750 m/s (V_{25})		None	Standard Ball.
8 mm sk ptr m/32 "For peacetime only"	FMJ	32,17	14,2	3,6	Kspkr 1/0,55	Lead core, Nickel jacket	760 m/s (2,500 ft/s)		Blue tip	Ammunition of inferior quality. Used in peacetime.
8 mm sk ptr m/32 "Not for machine guns"	FMJ	32,17	14,2	3,6	Kspkr 1/0,55	Lead core, Nickel jacket	760 m/s		Green tip	Same as above but has green marking. This means "Not for machine guns"
8 mm sk ptr m/32 pprj m/39	AP	29,7	11,8	3,6	Kspkr 1/0,55 pbr	3,2 g steel core	780-810 m/s		Black tip	Ordinary armor-piercing cartridge. Penetration of ~10 mm at 50 m
8 mm sk ptr m/32 pprj m/40 or 8 mm pbr ptr m/32-40	AP	31,14	15,7	3,6	Kspkr 1/0,55 pbr	Tungsten core	725 m/s		Top half black	Tungsten-cored ammunition. Penetration of ~20 mm at 0 m Only used in machine guns.
8 mm sk ptr m/32 slprj m/39	Tracer	28,9	11,01	3,6	Kspkr 1/0,55	Projectile contains phosphorus, no boat tail	780-824 m/s	red 100-800 m	Red tip	First marking of slprj m/39
8 mm sk ptr m/32 slprj m/39	Tracer	28,9	11,01	3,6	Kspkr 1/0,55	Projectile contains phosphorus, no boat tail	780-824 m/s	red 100-800 m	White tip	Second marking of slprj m/39.
8 mm sk ptr m/32 slprj m/39 "with a different primer"	Tracer	28,9	11,01	3,6	Kspkr 1/0,55	Projectile contains phosphorus, no boat tail	780-824 m/s	Red 100-800 m	Red tip	The primer is dark gray and non-magnetic. Likely manufactured in Germany.
8 mm sk ptr m/32 brandprj m/40	Incendiary		11,55			Phosphorus and lead			Yellow tip	Incendiary ammunition from Hungary. Trubbkula.
8 mm sk ptr m/32 brandprj m/41	Incendiary/AP	27,7	9,8-9.9	3,6	Kspkr 1/0,55 pbr	Has an internal steel core surrounderd by fuel	835-930 m/s		Orange tip	The ammunition is primarily for aircraft and is a semi-armor piercing projectile
8 mm Tysk B patron "Observation cartridge"	High-explosive incendiary								Bottom halve black	German B bullet loaded in a Swedish 8×63 cartridge.
8 mm sk blindptr m/32	Dummy								None	Early marking.
8 mm sk blindptr m/32	Dummy								Green tip	Late marking.

The operating pressures of the various ammunition types varied between 330–350 MPa (47,862–50,763 psi).

== See also ==
- List of Swedish military calibres
- List of rebated rim cartridges
- 8 mm caliber
