= Tony Stein =

US Marine and Medal of Honor recipient (1921–1945)

Anthony Michael "Tony" Stein
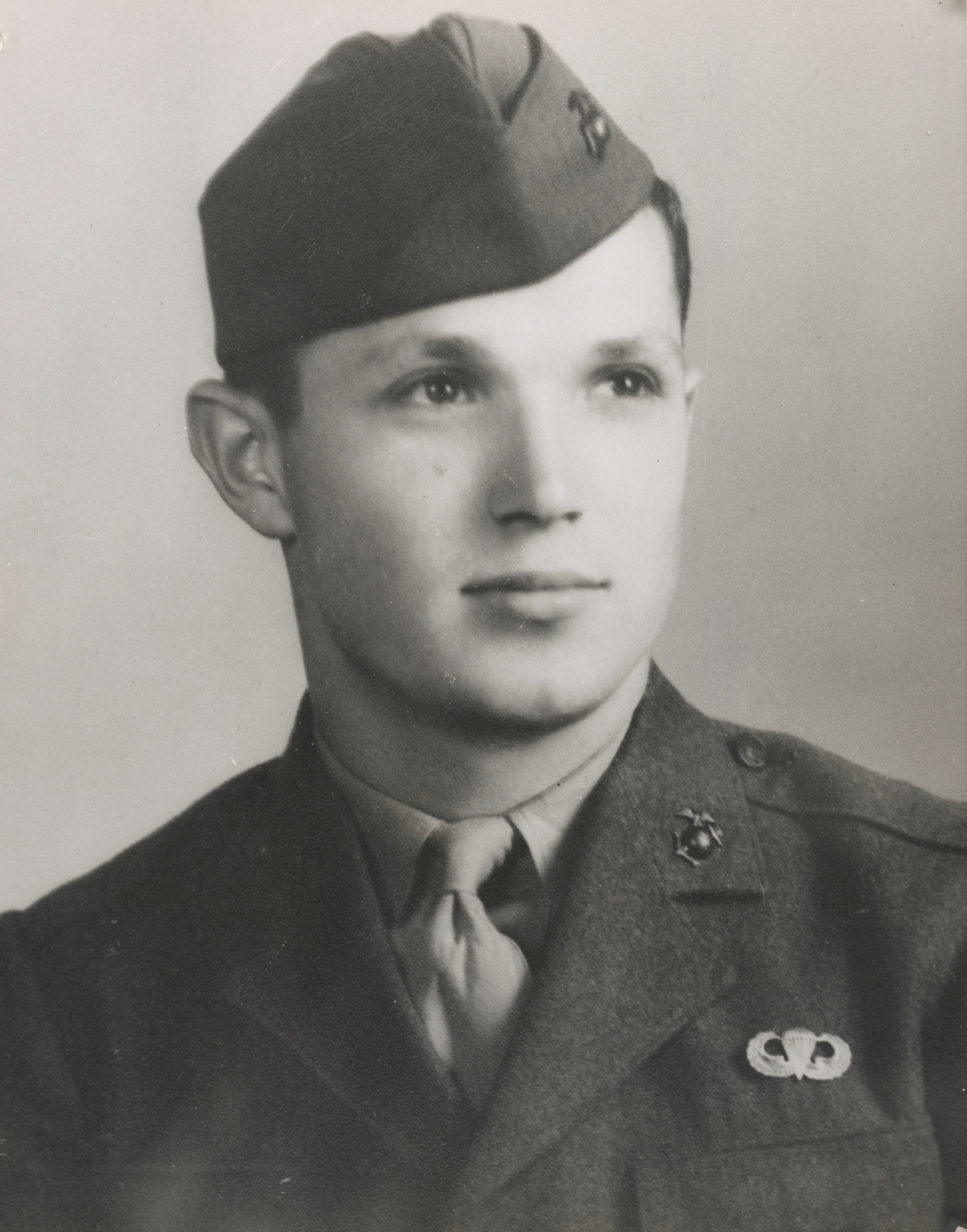
- Tony Stein, posthumous Medal of Honor recipient
- Born: September 30, 1921; Dayton, Ohio, United States
- Died: March 1, 1945 (aged 23); Iwo Jima, Bonin Islands, Japanese Empire
- Burial place: Calvary Cemetery, Dayton, Ohio, United States
- Military career
- Allegiance: United States of America
- Branch: United States Marine Corps
- Service years: 1942–1945
- Rank: Corporal
- Units: 3rd Parachute Battalion, 1st Parachute Regiment, 3rd Marine Division; 1st Battalion, 28th Marines, 5th Marine Division
- Conflicts: World War II; Land Battle of Vella Lavella; Bougainville Campaign; Battle of Iwo Jima †
- Awards: Medal of Honor; Purple Heart; American Campaign Medal

Tony Stein (September 30, 1921 – March 1, 1945) was a United States Marine who posthumously received the U.S. military's highest decoration, the Medal of Honor, for his actions in World War II. He received the award for repeatedly making single-handed assaults against the enemy and for aiding wounded Marines during the initial assault on Iwo Jima on February 19, 1945. He was killed in action ten days later.

== Biography ==
Stein was born in Dayton, Ohio, on September 30, 1921, to Steve (formerly called Istvan) and Rose née Brandulek, Jewish immigrants from Erdevik, Austria-Hungary (now Serbia), and attended Kiser High School there. He enlisted in the United States Marine Corps Reserve on September 22, 1942. He knew they were the first sent into battle and he wanted to defend his country.

Stein was a member of the elite Paramarines from the end of his recruit training until the Paramarines were disbanded in 1944. Assigned to Headquarters Company, 3rd Parachute Battalion, 1st Parachute Regiment, 3rd Marine Division, Stein fought in the Vella Lavella and Bougainville Campaigns, shooting five snipers in a single day during the latter operation. A toolmaker prior to the war, Stein customized a .30 caliber AN/M2 Browning machine gun from a wrecked Navy fighter plane into a highly effective personal machine gun he nicknamed the "Stinger". After the Paramarines were disbanded, Stein returned to Camp Pendleton, California, where he was promoted to corporal and assigned as an assistant squad leader to Company A, 1st Battalion, 28th Marines in the newly formed 5th Marine Division.

On February 19, 1945, he took part in the amphibious landings which began the Battle of Iwo Jima. As his unit moved inland, he stormed a series of hostile pillboxes using his "Stinger" and made eight trips back to the beach to retrieve ammunition, each time taking a wounded Marine with him. It was for his actions on this day that he was later awarded the Medal of Honor. The 28th Marines next helped capture Mount Suribachi itself, culminating in the raising of the U.S. flag on the mountain's peak on February 23. Stein was wounded during the fight for Suribachi and evacuated to a hospital ship. Meanwhile, his regiment advanced up the west side of the island until reaching the strongly defended Hill 362A, where they took heavy casualties. When Stein heard of this, he left the hospital ship and returned to his unit. On March 1, he was killed by a sniper while leading a 19-man patrol to reconnoiter a machine gun emplacement which had Company A pinned down. Stein's Medal of Honor was presented to his widow on February 19, 1946, during a ceremony in the office of Ohio Governor Frank Lausche. Stein was initially buried in the 5th Division Cemetery on Iwo Jima. Following the war, his remains were returned to the U.S. for reinterment in his native Dayton. Stein, Dayton's only World War II recipient of the Medal of Honor, was buried with full military honors on December 17, 1948, in Calvary Cemetery following funeral services at Our Lady of the Rosary Church. His mother Rose wanted Tony buried in a Jewish cemetery, but following his wife's wishes, he was buried under a Christian cross.

== Legacy ==
USS Stein (FF-1065), a U.S. Navy Knox-class frigate commissioned in 1972, was named in his honor. The Marine Corps also dedicated the Moving Target Simulator Building located in the 3d Low Altitude Air Defense (LAAD) Battalion's area of operations on Camp Pendleton, California in 1989.

== Medal of Honor citation ==
The President of the United States takes pride in presenting the MEDAL OF HONOR posthumously to

CORPORAL TONY STEIN
UNITED STATES MARINE CORPS RESERVE

for service as set forth in the following CITATION:

For conspicuous gallantry and intrepidity at the risk of his life above and beyond the call of duty while serving with Company A, 1st Battalion, 28th Marines, 5th Marine Division, in action against enemy Japanese forces on Iwo Jima, in the Volcano Islands, 19 February 1945. The first man of his unit to be on station after hitting the beach in the initial assault, Cpl. Stein, armed with a personally improvised aircraft-type weapon, provided rapid covering fire as the remainder of his platoon attempted to move into position. When his comrades were stalled by a concentrated machinegun and mortar barrage, he gallantly stood upright and exposed himself to the enemy's view, thereby drawing the hostile fire to his own person and enabling him to observe the location of the furiously blazing hostile guns. Determined to neutralize the strategically placed weapons, he boldly charged the enemy pillboxes 1 by 1 and succeeded in killing 20 of the enemy during the furious single-handed assault. Cool and courageous under the merciless hail of exploding shells and bullets which fell on all sides, he continued to deliver the fire of his skillfully improvised weapon at a tremendous rate of speed which rapidly exhausted his ammunition. Undaunted, he removed his helmet and shoes to expedite his movements and ran back to the beach for additional ammunition, making a total of 8 trips under intense fire and carrying or assisting a wounded man back each time. Despite the unrelenting savagery and confusion of battle, he rendered prompt assistance to his platoon whenever the unit was in position, directing the fire of a half-track against a stubborn pillbox until he had effected the ultimate destruction of the Japanese fortification. Later in the day, although his weapon was twice shot from his hands, he personally covered the withdrawal of his platoon to the company position. Stouthearted and indomitable, Cpl. Stein, by his aggressive initiative sound judgment, and unwavering devotion to duty in the face of terrific odds, contributed materially to the fulfillment of his mission, and his outstanding valor throughout the bitter hours of conflict sustains and enhances the highest traditions of the U.S. Naval Service.

/S/ HARRY S. TRUMAN

== See also ==
- List of Medal of Honor recipients for World War II
- List of Medal of Honor recipients for the Battle of Iwo Jima
