= Swedish Fortification Corps =

Fortification Corps
- Fortifikationen
- Active: 1635–1937
- Country: Sweden
- Allegiance: Swedish Armed Forces
- Role: Military engineering
- Size: Corps
- Part of: The Artillery (1635–1641); War College (1641–1681); The King (1681–1703); War College (1703–1811); Corps of Engineers under the Army Materiel Administration (1811–1831); Topographic Corps (partly) (1831–1832); Army Materiel Administration (1832–1937)
- March: "Leve Fortifikationen!" and "Kungliga Fortifikationens honnörsmarsch" (S. Rydberg)

Commanders
- Notable commanders: Erik Dahlbergh

The Swedish Fortification Corps (Swedish: Fortifikationen) was responsible for constructing and maintaining Sweden's land and coastal defenses, along with other military structures. It became an independent unit in 1641, though its origins date back to 1635, when a Quartermaster General was appointed to oversee all fortifications. Initially subordinate to the Artillery General, the corps gradually gained greater autonomy. It was placed under the War College, except from 1681 to 1719, when it reported directly to the King. At first, its responsibilities covered only Sweden and Finland, but from 1680, they expanded to include the Baltic provinces, and from 1681, Sweden's German territories.

The corps was organized into the Quartermaster General's office (known as the Fortification Office), personnel stationed at fortresses, and specialized field units that operated during wartime. In 1721, the corps was divided into five brigades, along with the Stralsund Fortification Corps. This structure remained until 1778, when one brigade was disbanded. By 1798, the brigade system was abolished altogether. Between 1727 and 1792, certain fortress construction projects, particularly in Finland and Scania, were placed under separate command. In 1811, the Fortification Corps merged with the Field Survey Corps to form the Engineer Corps, which included a fortification brigade. In 1867, the Engineer Corps was renamed the Fortification Corps once again. Over time, additional units were incorporated, including sapper companies (later a battalion), a pontoon battalion, a field signal company, and engineer troops.

The internal structure of the Fortification Office evolved over the years. In the early 18th century, it consisted of a military division (the drawing office) and two civilian divisions: the chancery and the finance office. Throughout most of the 19th century, it included a chief's office, a major's office (from the 1780s to 1870), a drawing office, and an archive. The Fortification Corps was dissolved in 1937 and reorganized into three separate branches: the Swedish Army Fortifications Corps, the Engineer Troops, and the Signal Troops.

== History ==
=== Origins of the Fortifikationsstaten ===
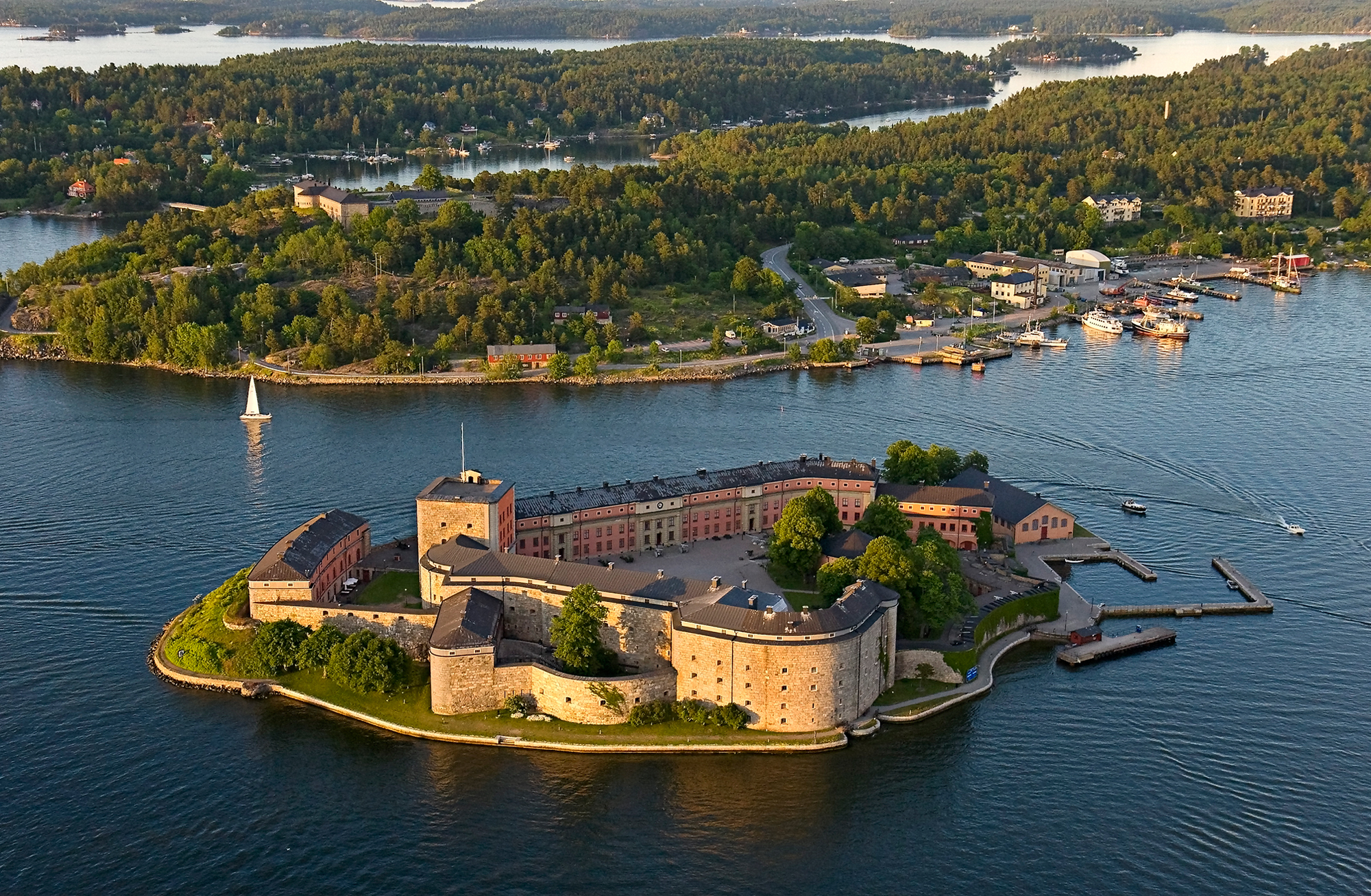
In 1548, the first construction of Vaxholm Fortress was carried out

Fortifikationsstaten traces its origins to 1635. However, even before that, military engineers—initially mostly foreigners—were employed in Swedish service, both in peacetime and on the battlefield. These engineers were known as "byggmästare" (master builders) in peacetime and "lägermästare" (camp masters), "vallmästare" (rampart masters), and "skansmästare" (redoubt masters) in the field. From 1579, titles such as "generalkvartermästare" (Quartermaster General), "generalkvartermästarlöjtnant" (Lieutenant Quartermaster General), and "överstekvartermästare" (Senior Quartermaster) were introduced.

During the reign of Gustav I and his sons, several prominent military builders played key roles in fortification efforts. Among them were: Henrik von Cöllen, Anders Larsson (Målare), Jakob Richter, Hans Mess de Porte, Arendt de Roy, Lodwich van Hoffwen, Paar brothers, Willem Boy, Hans Fleming, Jakob von Stengelen, Peter Hertig, Arendt and Mauritz Asserij, Johannes Baptista Bresselisij, Hans Stuart, Peter Dionisius, Daniel Brandt, Peter Nicolaus de Kempe, Hero Janss, Hans Nykyrkie, Robert Myr, and Johan van Monickhouen.

These engineers were responsible for constructing or rebuilding numerous castles and fortifications, including: Gripsholm, Uppsala, Vadstena, Örebro, Jönköping's and Nyköping' Castles, Vaxholm, Kalmar Castle and city, Älvsborg, Gullberg, Gothenburg on Hisingen, Borkholm, Stäkeborg, Mörsill and Frösö Sconces, Viborg, Nyslott, Tavastehus, Åbo Castle and Kajaneborg, Keksholm, Narva, Jama and Nyen, Reval, Weissenstein and Vasknarva, Pernau, Fellin, Dorpat, Wolmar, Marienburg, and Salis.

=== Formation of Military Engineering Units ===
For a long time, military engineers—especially those based in Sweden—were not grouped into any organized military unit but were instead hired individually. This changed in 1612 when Johan van Monickhouen arrived from the Netherlands, accompanied by engineer Andreas Sersanders. In 1613, Sersanders was sent back to the Netherlands to recruit additional engineers and returned with eight conductors.

As more military engineers entered Swedish service, King Gustavus Adolphus began forming field fortification units (fältfortifikationsstater). This allowed fortresses to have permanent fortification personnel. However, these personnel were not yet placed under a unified command—an idea Gustavus Adolphus had considered as early as 1617. Instead, they were assigned to the artillery. Meanwhile, the field fortification units were led by officers with titles such as "fältkvartermästare" (Field Quartermaster), "överstekvartermästare" (Senior Quartermaster), and later "generalkvartermästare" (Quartermaster General).

Notable Quartermaster Generals included: Reinhold Taube, Monickhouen, Robert Myr och Patrick Ruthven (during the Russian War), Hans Fersen, Georg von Schwengeln and Georg Günther Kraill von Bemeberg (during the Polish War), Frans de Traytorrens, and Olof Hansson Swartt (during the German War).

=== Military Engineering During Gustavus Adolphus's Reign ===
During Gustavus Adolphus's reign, significant contributions to military engineering were made by: Hans Fleming, Daniel Brandt, Hero Janss, Andreas Sersanders, Anders Gooson van der Maa, Paul von Essen, Jost van Wierdt, Johan von Arendz, Johan Schultz, and Hindrich Thome. These engineers contributed to the construction or improvement of fortifications at: Jönköping, Kalmar, Älvsborg, Gullberg, Gothenburg, Nyslott, Viborg, Keksholm, Nöteborg, Nyen, Narva, Reval, Pernau, Riga, Kobron Sconce, Dünamünde, Dorpat, Kokenhusen, and Evst Sconce.

They also played a role in city planning, including demarcating Falun, Kalmar, Gothenburg, and Jönköping. Among the numerous fortifications built by Gustavus Adolphus's field engineers were: Mitau, Birsen and Bauske, Pillau, Braunsberg, Elbing, Marienburg, Danziger Haupt and Montauer Spitze, Stralsund, Peenemünde, Stettin, Demmin, Schwedt, Werben, Mainz, Gustavsburg, and Nuremberg.

=== The Establishment of the Quartermaster General Position ===
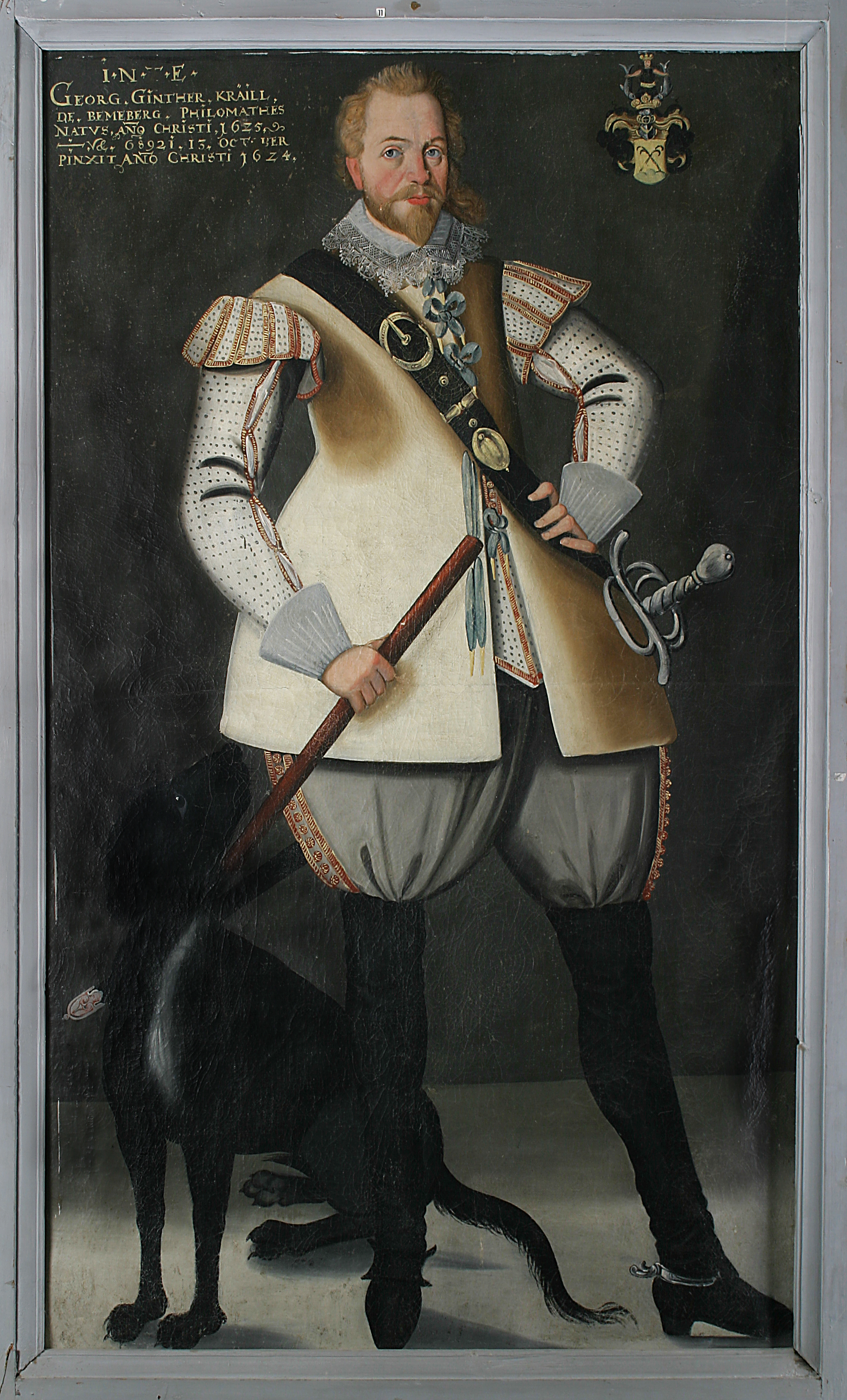
Georg Günther Kräill von Bemeberg became Sweden's first Quartermaster General in 1631

In 1631, the first Quartermaster General was appointed in Sweden—Georg Günther Kräill von Bemeberg. However, he does not appear to have been the head of the fortifications personnel within the artillery, nor did he oversee the kingdom's permanent defenses. The need for such a position, recognized earlier by Gustavus Adolphus, remained, and in 1634, Olof Hansson, who had returned to Sweden, was appointed Quartermaster General "over the fortifications." He was placed in charge of the fortifications personnel, which at the time consisted of two engineers, four conductors, and eight workmaster journeymen.

However, Hansson was dispatched to Prussia and Livonia but returned the following year, was ennobled under the name Örnehufwudh, and received a renewed appointment as "Quartermaster General and over all fortifications." His authority extended over all engineers, master craftsmen, and conductors employed in fortress construction, under the artillery command. With this, the fortifications personnel—now expanded to three engineers, one master craftsman, eight conductors, two copyists, and one clerk—was organized into a separate corps under a Quartermaster General, though still formally under the artillery command until 1641. That year, the fortifications corps was separated from the artillery and became an independent unit under the War College, and later, as a fully separate entity.

=== Fortification Works and Expansion ===
During Örnehufwudh's tenure, fortification works continued at Gothenburg, Älvsborg, and Jönköping, while new works began at Kalmar and Ryssås Redoubt. Cities such as Stockholm, Norrköping, and Viborg were regulated, and new settlements like Alingsås, Helsinki, Åmål, and Vänersborg were established. Other construction efforts included sluices at Lilla Edet. In Kexholm County and Ingermanland, fortifications were led by engineer Trajan Becker, while in Estonia and Livonia, General Engineer Johan von Rodenburg oversaw works, including the rebuilding of Nymünde.

After Örnehufwudh's death in 1644, Johan Andersson (Lenaeus) Wärnschiöldh succeeded him, holding the post until his death in 1674. He was briefly succeeded by Jacob Staël von Holstein, who soon transitioned to the artillery. That same year, Erik Jönsson Dahlbergh was appointed Quartermaster General.

By 1674, under Wärnschiöldh, the fortifications corps had grown to include a Quartermaster General, two lieutenant Quartermaster Generals, four engineers, seven conductors, a German carpenter, a cashier, and a materials clerk. However, this force was focused solely on Swedish fortifications. The Baltic provinces and German territories had their own fortifications personnel, largely independent of the Swedish Quartermaster General. Over time, these formed separate fortifications corps under their own General Engineers, Chief Engineers, or Quartermaster Generals.

=== Centralization of the Fortifications Corps ===
In 1680, fortifications in the Baltic provinces were placed under Swedish command, followed by the German territories in 1681. Under Dahlbergh's leadership, the fortifications corps expanded significantly, growing to 99 officers, 66 civilian staff, and 276 craftsmen by his death in 1703, totaling 441 personnel divided into regular and extraordinary staff.

Initially, the service regulations for fortifications personnel were based on temporary instructions. However, in 1653, a formal "Fortifications Ordinance" was issued by the King in Council, later revised in 1658, 1666, and 1695. These regulations detailed fortress construction, financial management, and more, though they did not cover other common duties of fortification officers, such as cartography, city planning, and canalization projects.

=== Field Operations and Wartime Roles ===
During wartime, the standing fortifications personnel were needed at headquarters and fortresses. As a result, separate field fortifications units were sometimes formed, to which regular or extra personnel could be assigned. The Quartermaster General occasionally took part in field campaigns, as seen with Örnehufwudh in Scania and Halland (1644), Wärnschiöldh (1657), and Dahlbergh during the Danish War (1675–79). When the Quartermaster General did not personally enter the field, special field Quartermaster Generals or Lieutenants were appointed for each army. Notable among them were Paulus Morsheuser, Conrad Mardefelt, and Simon Grundel-Helmfelt during the Thirty Years' War, as well as Mardefelt, Johan Gorries von Gorgas, and Dahlbergh under Charles X's campaigns. During the Great Northern War, Carl Magnus Stuart and Axel Gyllenkrok were among those leading fortifications efforts.

=== Leadership Changes and Further Development ===
Dahlbergh, who reported directly to the King as the "National Quartermaster General," (riksgeneralkvartermästare) was transferred to Livonia as governor. Carl Magnus Stuart assisted him in overseeing fortifications, and upon Dahlbergh's death in 1703, Stuart assumed full responsibility. Stuart died in 1705, and in 1706, his son-in-law Magnus Palmqvist succeeded him as Quartermaster General and Director of Fortifications. In 1719, Palmqvist was appointed governor and was replaced by Axel Löwen.

=== Wärnschiöld's Era ===
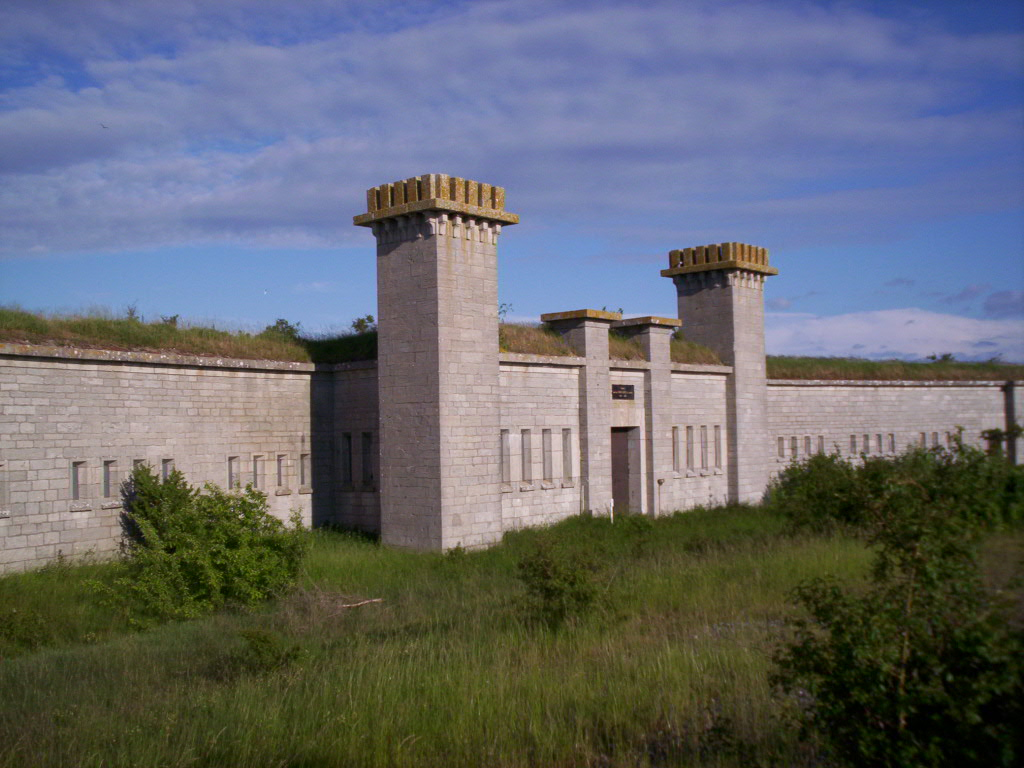
Karlsvärd Fortress was constructed during Johan Wärnschiöldh era (1644–1674)

During Wärnschiöld's time, the fortification of several key locations continued or began. These included Kalmar, Gothenburg with Ryssås, Vänersborg, Vaxholm, Halmstad, Bohus, and the Skåne fortresses, as well as several others in Sweden, Kexholm, and the Ingrian fortresses. Additionally, fortifications were built at Vasknarva, Reval, and Arensborg, along with several in Livonia, including Demmin, Stettin, Damm, Anklam, and Greifswald in Pomerania, as well as at Warnemünde and Wismar, along with fortresses and entrenchments in Bremen. New constructions during this time included Billingen, Kyrkogårdsholmen, New Älvsborg, Andersö Skans, Karlsvärd, Eda Skans, Bodekull, Karlshamn, Dalarö Sconce, Marstrand, Kirkholm, Geestendorf, and Karlsburg.

=== Dahlbergh's Era ===
Under Dahlbergh's leadership, nearly all the fortifications maintained or unfinished up until that point in the vast Swedish realm were either strengthened or rebuilt. Fortifications such as Kronan and Göta Lejon, Karlskrona with Kungsholmen and Drottningskär, and Valfisken, among others, were constructed. Major works continued on Vaxholm, Dalarö, Kalmar, Karlskrona, Malmö, Landskrona, Gothenburg, New Älvsborg, Bohus, Marstrand, Viborg, Riga, Kobron, Pernau, Reval, Narva, Nyen, Nöteborg, Kexholm, Stettin, Damm, Stralsund, Peenemünde, Wismar, Stade, and in the fortifications of Kurland, where a separate fortification state was established.

=== Palmqvist's Era ===
During Palmqvist's time, there was a reduction in building allocations, but work continued on several of the aforementioned fortifications, except those already lost to Sweden. Efforts were also made for the defense of Stockholm, Kristianstad, Halmstad, Varberg, Uddevalla Skans, Strömstad, Sundsborg, Eda Skans, Frösö, Hjärpe, Dufeds, Långå Scounce's, Gotland's defense, and Arensborg and Nymünde.

=== Löwen's Leadership and Organizational Changes ===
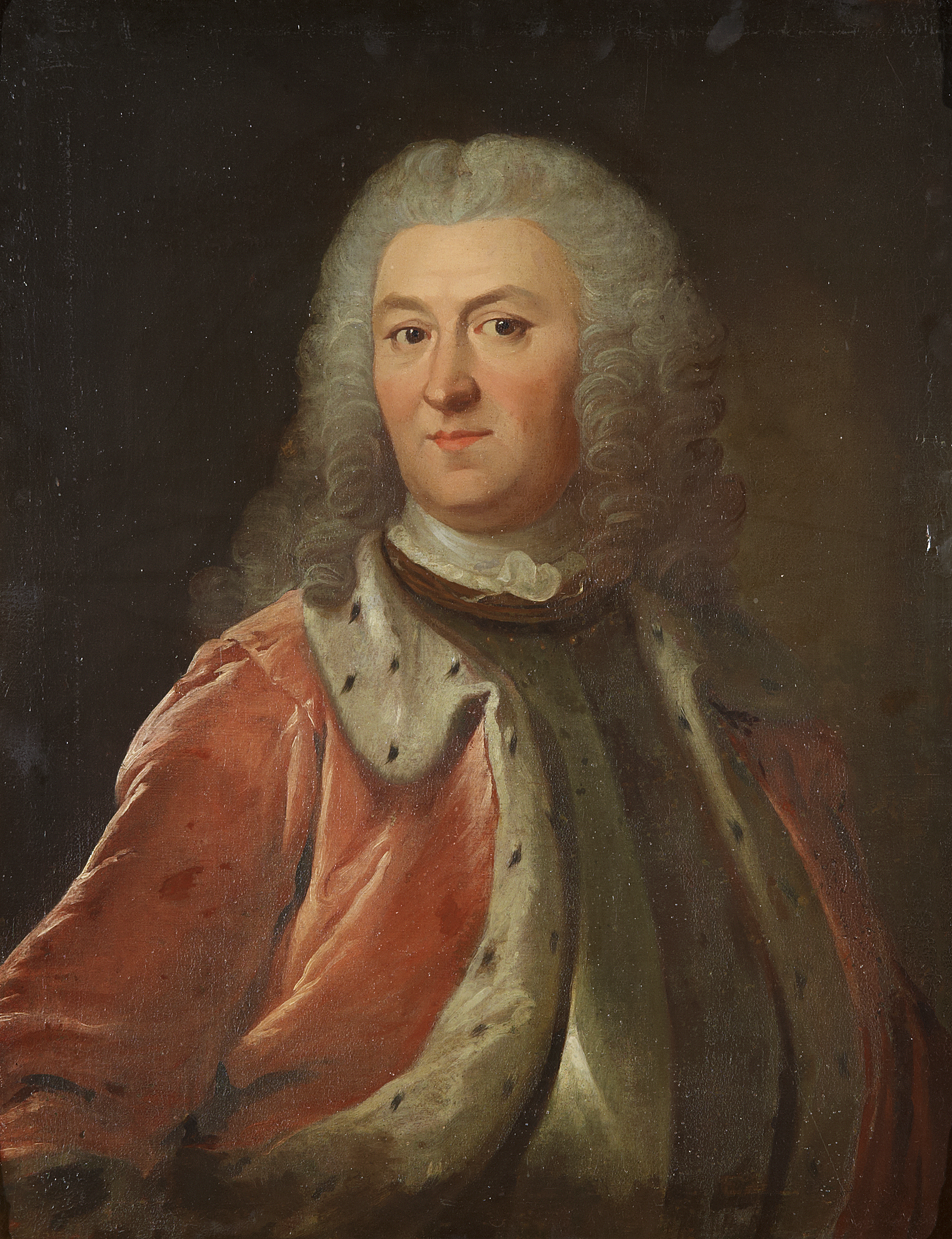
Axel Löwen (1686–1773) was head of the corps from 1719 to 1739

Under Löwen's leadership, following the wars and significant land concessions, the fortification state was reorganized. By 1721, in accordance with a proposal by Stuart, the fortifications were divided into five brigades:

1. Stockholm and its province, Södermanland, and Östergötland
2. Småland, Blekinge, and Gotland
3. Scania and Halland
4. Gothenburg and Bohus County
5. Finland

Later, the Stralsund fortification state was added to these five brigades. An extraordinary state for craftsmen was also introduced at this time. The personnel at this stage consisted of 60 officers, 20 civilians, and 33 craftsmen, totaling 113 individuals. In 1735, 13 extraordinary officers were added. This structure remained largely unchanged until 1778, though the personnel fluctuated slightly during this period.

=== Changes in Staff and Structure ===
From 1739, under Lorentz Kristoffer Stobée, the title of "vallmästare" (battalion master) was changed to "underkonduktörer" (under-conductors), and they formed the core of a fortifications non-commissioned officer corps. This was something Stuart had previously attempted. Under Gabriel Cronstedt, who succeeded Stobée in 1741, a few "adjutants" were added to the corps, later equated with conductors and thus officers. From 1768, a small number of sergeants and some corporals were also added, though they were soon removed. Notably, two colonel positions were added in 1762, and by 1764, a professor's position was established to increase the teaching staff at the information office, which had been training fortification officers for over a century.

=== Further Organizational Changes (1778-1806) ===
In 1778, Sweden's fortification brigades were reduced from four to three: life brigade Stockholm, Västgöta, and Skånska. Each brigade, including the Finnish, was organized into staff, with the life brigade consisting of 7 officers and 7 civilians, while the others had 4 officers and 5 civilians each, and company staff consisting of 10 officers and 12 non-commissioned officers per brigade. The Stralsund fortification state was now known as the Pomeranian Brigade (Pommerska brigaden).

In 1785, certain positions were swapped without affecting the overall budget. By 1798, the brigade structure was abolished, and fortifications were reorganized into an ordinary state consisting of staff, company, information, and civilian states. This totalled 51 officers, 8 non-commissioned officers, and 21 civilians. An extraordinary state, designed to be reduced upon vacancies, was also established. In 1806, following the separation of the field surveying component (fältmätningsdetaljen) from the corps, the title "Generalkvartermästare och direktör" was replaced by "Chef för Fortifikationen" (Head of Fortifications).

=== The Evolution of the Fortification Directorate and Its Responsibilities ===
From its inception, the primary task of the Fortification Corps was to oversee all fortification construction within the kingdom, which was managed under the direction of the Quartermaster General (generalkvartermästaren). However, in 1727, King in Council granted General Baron B. O. Stackelberg "full control over fortifications and fortification works in Finland," which were considered the most important and therefore required a higher-level officer on-site. This separation, however, seems to have occurred with Löwen's approval, possibly at his direct instigation, and did not last long. Stackelberg died in 1734, and in 1737, Löwen himself became the commanding general in Finland, while still retaining his position as Quartermaster General.

=== Separation and Restructuring of Fortification Tasks ===
At the urging of the Secret Committee, new fortification works in Finland were once again separated from the Fortification Corps in 1747, and those in Scania in 1748. These works were placed under the supervision of Lieutenant Colonel Augustin Ehrensvärd for Finland and Count H. H. von Liewen for Scania, both under the king's "own direction and oversight." In 1753, the fortification of Karlsvärd was also separated from the Fortification Corps. Cronstedt, unhappy with this unflattering treatment of him and the Fortification Corps, appealed to the Riksdag of the Estates, but in 1756, his grievances were deemed unfounded, and King in Council also concluded that Cronstedt "was wrong and at fault," though they decided to "nobly overlook a weakness that seemed less a result of his own intent than of others' malicious advice."

=== Continued Political Weakness and Leadership Transitions ===
This "political weakness" of the Fortification Corps persisted even after Cronstedt's resignation in 1757. It continued through the years until 1762, when the director's position was left vacant (Colonel Fabian Casimir Wrede was acting director), as under Johan Bernhard Virgin first time as director. However, in 1762, the Fortification Corps regained control of Karlsvärd, and when Caps rose to power in the 1765 Parliament, both the Finnish and Scania fortifications were transferred to the Fortification Director, as the "king's rightful man." The Finnish fortifications, however, remained under this new leadership only until 1770, when the Hats, to whom Ehrensvärd belonged, became the ruling party and reinstated him to lead these works, though with somewhat restricted authority.

=== Changes in Leadership and the Return of Finnish Fortifications ===
Virgin, who was not willing to accept this change, resigned in 1769 and was succeeded by Alexander Michael von Strussenfelt, who, in 1772, regained control of the Finnish fortifications. Strussenfelt resigned in the same year, and in 1773, leadership passed to Axel Magnus von Arbin, who handed it over to Johan von Hermansson in 1784. When Hermansson resigned in 1791, Nils Mannerskantz became Quartermaster General and Director.

=== Further Structural Changes and the Expansion of Responsibilities ===
That same year, the fortifications in Scania were partially placed under the direction of Major General Johan Christopher Toll, but they returned under Mannerskantz in 1792. From that point on, as expected, the head of the Fortification Corps continuously held leadership and responsibility for all fortifications and related works across the kingdom. Additionally, barracks, supply buildings, and other military structures were planned and constructed by the Fortification Corps. Hermansson's request to assign the construction of civil "public buildings" to fortification officers, as was often done in the 1600s, was, however, only met to a limited extent.

=== Fortification Works After the Time of Charles XII ===
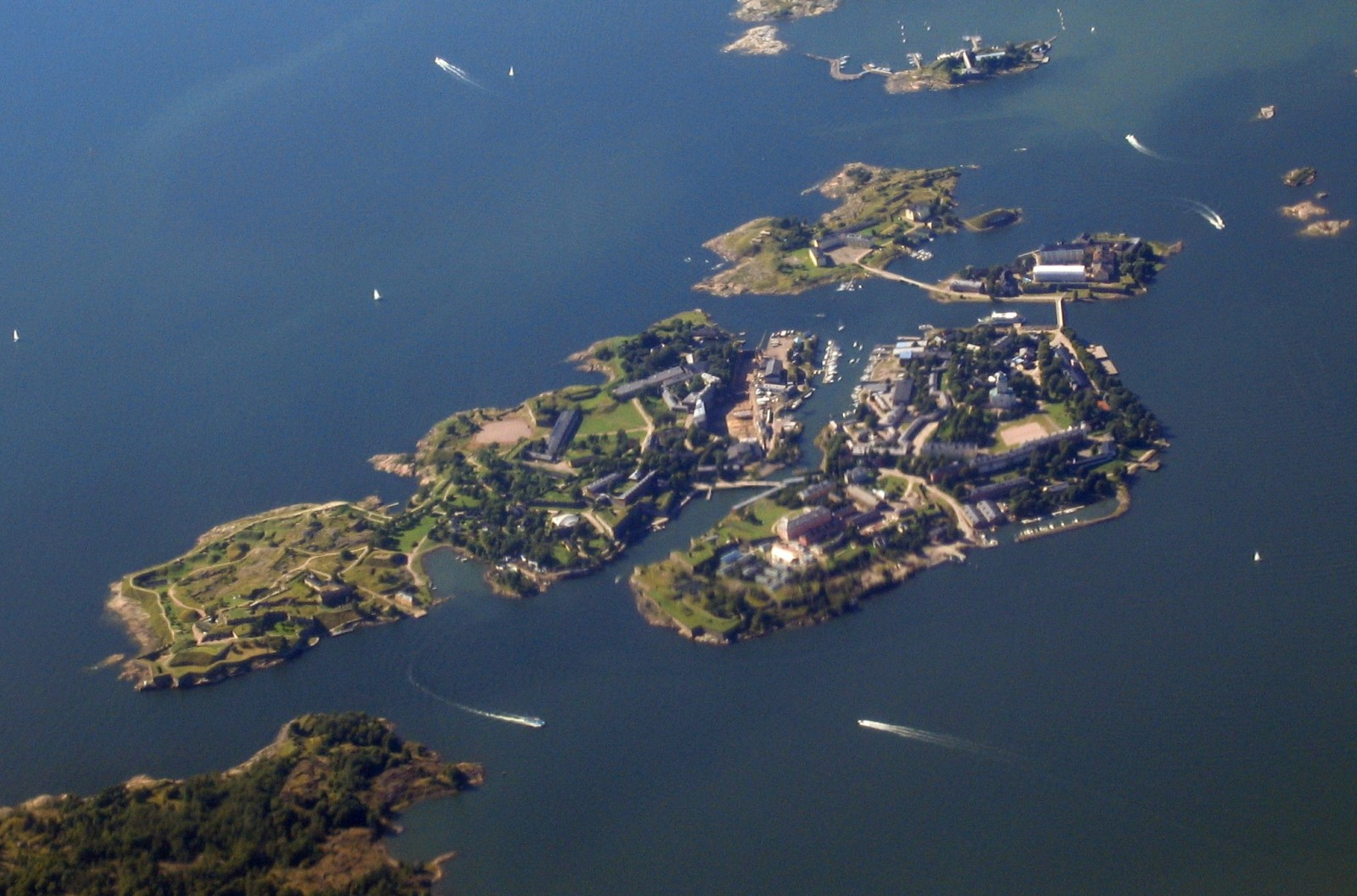
The construction of Suomenlinna/Sveaborg began in 1748

Among the fortification projects carried out after the time of Charles XII, notable examples include the reinforcement or reconstruction of Fredrikskans, fortifications in the Stockholm Archipelago, Kalmar, Karlsvärd, Karlskrona with Kungsholmen and Drottningskär, Karlshamn, Kristianstad (from 1748), Malmö, Landskrona (from 1748), Varberg, Gothenburg, New Älvsborg, Bohus, and Carlsten in Sweden, as well as Kajaneborg, Nyslott, and Tavastehus in Finland, and Stralsund in Pomerania. Newly constructed fortifications included Fredriksborg on Värmdö (1724–35), Gustafsborg, Fredriksborg at Marstrand, Villmanstrand, Vekkelaks or Fredrikshamn (from 1722), Degerby or Lovisa (from 1744), Svartholm (from 1748), Helsingfors (1748–50), Suomenlinna/Sveaborg (from 1748), and the fortifications at Hangö (from 1789). On the other hand, fortifications at Halmstad were dismantled in 1734, and those in Malmö and Gothenburg were removed in 1806.

=== Changes in Leadership and Structure of the Fortification Directorate ===
Mannerskantz was succeeded by Nils Cedergren, but he resigned in 1811, and Gustaf Wilhelm af Tibell became Quartermaster General and head of the Engineer Corps (Ingenjörkåren), which the Fortification Corps was now referred to as. This corps, which also received a vice chief (souschef), had been merged with the Field Survey Corps (Fältmätningskåren), established in 1805. It consisted of a fortification brigade with 26 officers and 10 non-commissioned officers, a field surveying brigade with 16 officers, an intelligence division with 1 professor and 2 intelligence officers, a civilian staff with 1 secretary, 1 clerk, and 9 material accountants (the Fortification Treasury (Fortifikationskammarkontoret) had been transferred to the Royal Swedish Army Materiel Administration), as well as a few additional ordinary craftsmen. The lowest officer rank was now underlöjtnant instead of conductor or adjutant. In 1812, when Tibell resigned and Bengt Franc-Sparre took over, the title of Quartermaster General was abolished permanently.

=== Further Organizational Changes and the Rise of Engineer Troops ===
In 1831, the Field Survey Brigade (Fältmätningsbrigaden) merged under the name Topographical Corps (Topografiska kåren) with the General Staff under the command of the army's general adjutant (generaladjutanten för armén), and the remainder of the Engineer Corps became known as the Swedish Army Fortifications Corps. However, the previous name was regained the following year. The corps’ leader, now transferred to the general's corps (generalitetet), was called 'General of Fortifications and Head of the Engineer Corps.' In 1834, craftsmen were excluded, and in 1845, the conductor title was introduced for a higher non-commissioned officer rank, with the lower rank being sub-conductor.

=== Death of Key Figures and Expansion of Military Units ===
After the death of Franc-Sparre in 1837, he was succeeded by Henrik Georg av Melin, who died in 1839. Johan Lefrén then became the General of Fortifications. In 1847, he was appointed Commander-in-Chief and was succeeded as head of the Engineer Corps by Karl Fredrik Meijer. Up until then, no engineering troops had belonged to the Fortification Corps, though pioneer companies dependent on it had been established time and again, only to disappear shortly thereafter. However, in 1855, a Sapper Company was formed, followed by a second in 1864, and a third in 1867, when the unit was renamed the Pontoon Battalion. Additionally, a Field Signal Company began forming in 1871, and a Sapper Battalion with 3 companies was established in 1873. Since the command of these troops was to be given to the Engineer Corps, which, with the return of its old name the Fortification Corps in 1867, had gradually increased to 62 officers and 54 non-commissioned officers by 1878 (now referred to as fanjunkare and sergeant), along with doctors, quartermasters, and regimental chaplains.

== 1892–1937 ==
=== Late 19th and Early 20th Century Expansions ===
In the 1892 army reorganization, the Fortification Corps grew to 77 officers and 60 non-commissioned officers, including 2 regimental trumpeters. The 1901 army order led to another significant increase, largely due to the establishment of several engineering troops. Following the completed reorganization, the Fortification Corps was constituted by 13 regimental and 115 company officers, 42 sergeants major and 66 sergeants, 1 regimental chaplain, 1 secretary, 2 auditors, 5 doctors, 2 veterinarians, 1 fortification cashier, 10 fortification accountants and storekeepers, 9 foremen, 15 ordnance craftsmen, 3 gun craftsmen, 15 music officers, and 1 chief and 3 storekeepers. With the 1914 reorganization, the corps grew further to 173 officers and 140 non-commissioned officers, in addition to civilian-military personnel. By the 1925 army order, personnel was reduced to 133 officers and 91 non-commissioned officers.

=== Fortification Personnel and Service in 1908 ===
By 1908, the fortification personnel were assigned to serve both at the Fortification Staff (fortifikationsstaben) and the Swedish Engineer Troops. The Fortification Staff was distributed between the main station (Stockholm), army divisions, and fortifications. The main station was divided into the office of the head of the Fortifications and the troop division, with staff from the main station assigned to the Royal Swedish Army Materiel Administration's Fortification Department's military bureau. From 1908, the fortifications and barracks construction departments previously belonging to the main station were transferred, along with the Royal Swedish Naval Materiel Administration's Fortification Department. To be promoted to second lieutenant (löjtnant av 2:a klass) at the Fortification Corps, completing the lower fortification course at the Artillery and Engineering College was mandatory, while the higher course was optional. The uniform of the Fortification Corps, now the same as the rest of the army, had, for centuries, been the old Swedish medium blue color, with an emblem consisting of a five-pointed star surrounded by rays.

=== Fortification Projects After 1809 ===
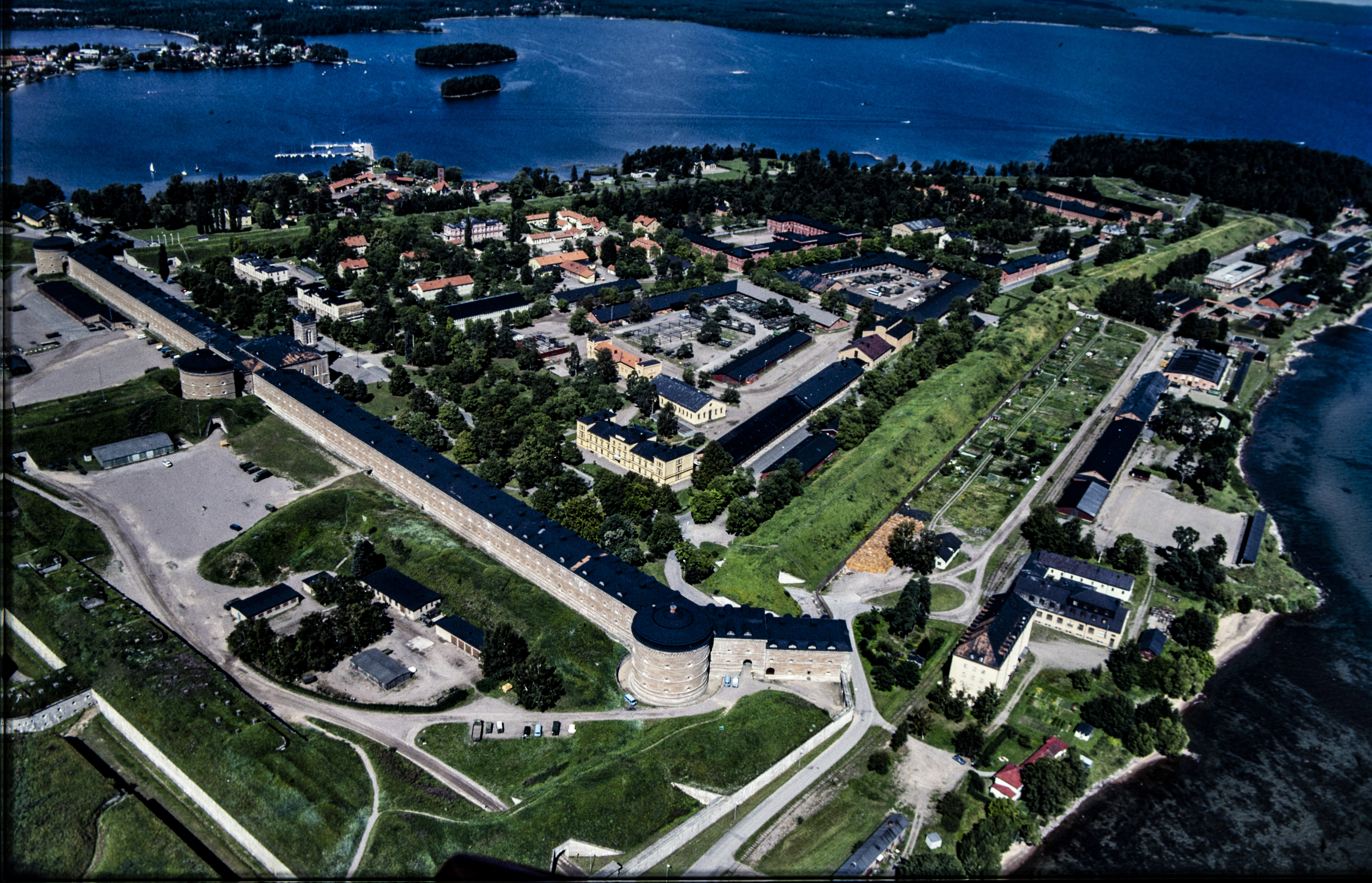
Karlsborg Fortress, constructed between 1819 and 1907

Among the fortification works carried out after 1809 by the Fortification Corps were the new construction of Karlsborg from 1819 to 1907, Enholmen from 1853 to 1858, Västra Hästholmen from 1863 to 1878, Oskar-Fredriksborg from 1868 to 1877, the Oskarsvärn Lines from 1871 to 1882, Fårösund in 1885–86, Vaberget in 1889–97, Älvsborg from 1899 to 1907, Boden from 1900, and Tingstäde from 1904. In addition, rebuilding took place at Kungsholmen from 1822 to 1856, 1871 to 1877, and 1891, Vaxholm from 1828 to 1863, and Fårösund from 1899 to 1901. Reinforcement works were carried out on the Vaxholm and Oskar-Fredriksborg fortifications from 1896 to 1906 and on the Karlskrona Fortress from 1896. By 1908, all other fortifications in Sweden were dismantled, most recently Carlsten in 1882 after being reinforced just a few decades earlier. In the first decade of the 20th century, several large barracks establishments and other buildings were constructed for the army and the Swedish Coastal Artillery, under the oversight of the Fortification Corps.

=== Final years ===
In 1916, a special fortification staff was established. In 1934, Major General Ove Sylvan became the head of the Fortification Corps. During his tenure, the Defence Act of 1936 led to the separation of the Engineer Troops and Signal Troops (Field Telegraph Troops) as new branches of the armed forces, while the remaining organization retained the name Fortification Corps. Throughout the 20th century, numerous barracks and other military structures were built, along with the establishment of the Boden, Tingstäde, and Hemsö fortresses. Additionally, extensive coastal defenses, particularly in the Stockholm and Karlskrona archipelagos, as well as border defenses in the west and north, were developed.

With the Defence Act of 1936, the Fortification Corps was disbanded in 1937 and divided into the Swedish Army Fortifications Corps, the Swedish Engineer Troops, and the Swedish Army Signal Troops.

== Commanding officers ==
- 1631–1634: Georg Günther Kräill von Bemeberg
- 1634–1644: Olof Örnehufvud
- 1644–1674: Johan Wärnschiöldh
- 1674-1674: Jakob Staël von Holstein
- 1674-1703: Erik Dahlbergh
- 1703–1705: Carl Magnus Stuart
- 1706–1719: Magnus Palmqvist
- 1719–1739: Axel Löwen
- 1739–1741: Lorentz Kristoffer Stobée
- 1741–1757: Gabriel Cronstedt
- 1757–1762: Fabian Casimir Wrede (acting)
- 1762–1769: Johan Bernhard Virgin
- 1769–1773: Alexander Michael von Strussenfelt
- 1773–1784: Axel Magnus von Arbin
- 1784–1791: Johan von Hermansson
- 1791–1809: Nils Mannerskantz
- 1809–1811: Nils Cedergren
- 1811–1812: Gustaf Wilhelm af Tibell
- 1812–1837: Bengt Franc-Sparre
- 1837–1839: Georg Henrik af Melin
- 1839–1847: Johan Lefrén
- 1847–1858: Carl Fredrik Meijer
- 1858–1868: Johan af Kleen
- 1868–1891: Abraham Leijonhufvud
- 1891–1903: Hampus Elliot
- 1903–1910: Alarik Bergman
- 1910–1915: Ludvig Munthe
- 1915–1923: Axel Odelstierna
- 1923–1934: Henri de Champs
- 1934–1941: Ove Sylvan
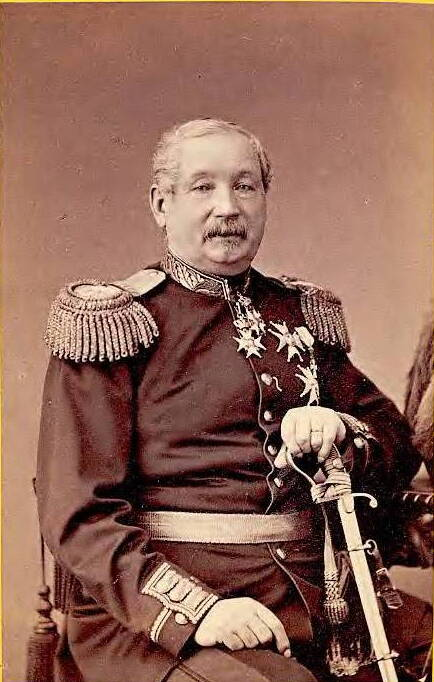
Johan af Kleen
(1858–1868)

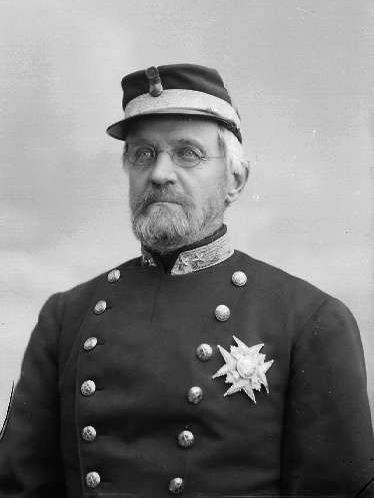
Abraham Leijonhufvud
(1868–1891)

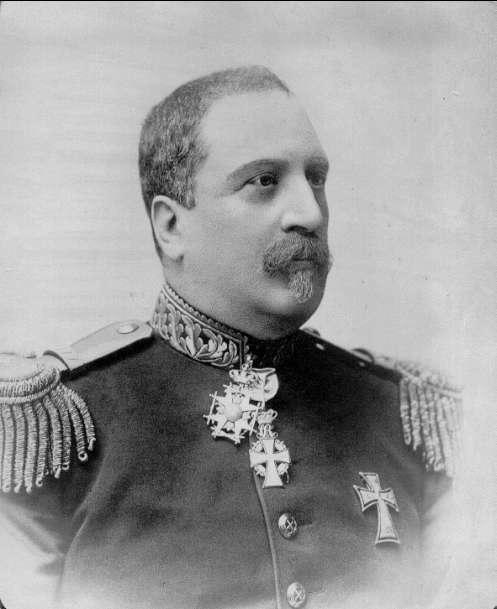
Hampus Elliot
(1891–1903)

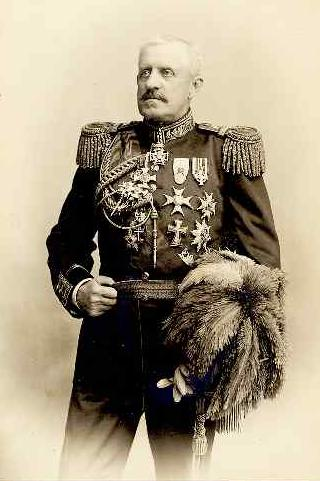
Alarik Bergman
(1903–1910)

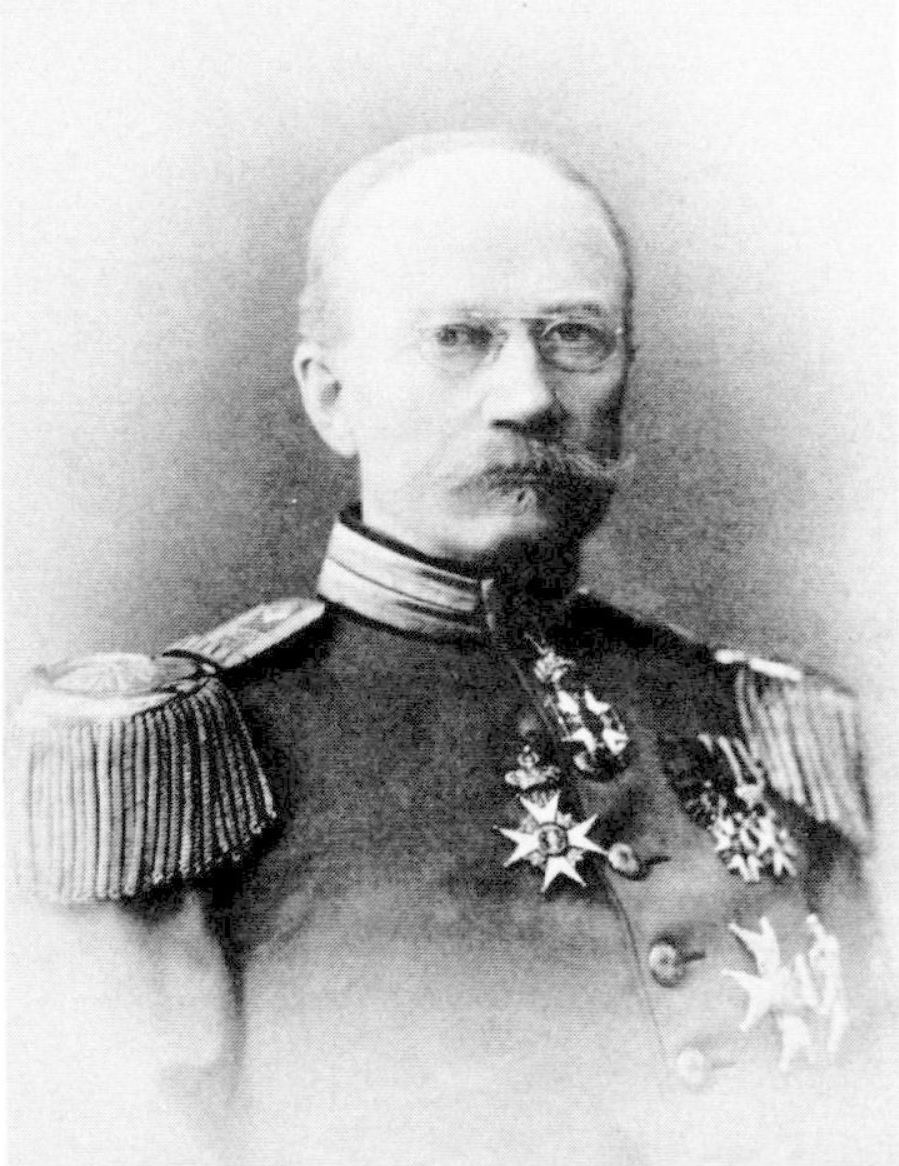
Ludvig Munthe (1910–1915)

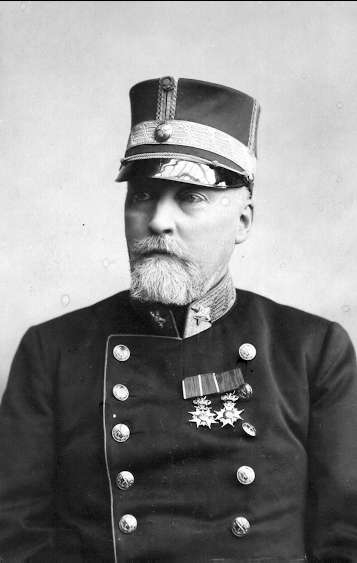
Axel Odelstierna
(1915–1923)

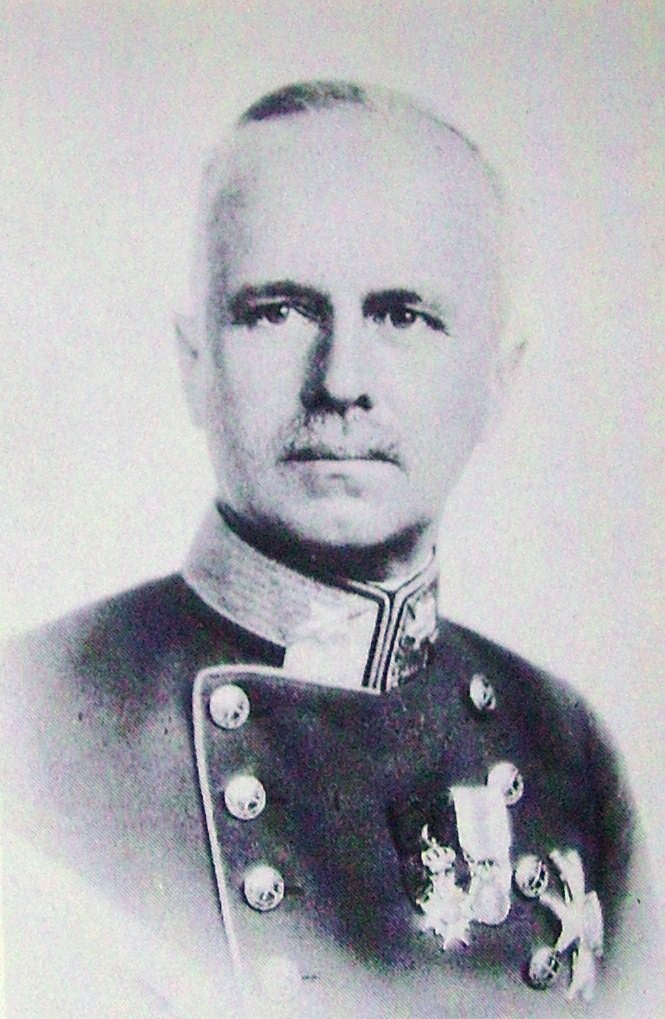
Henri de Champs
(1923–1934)

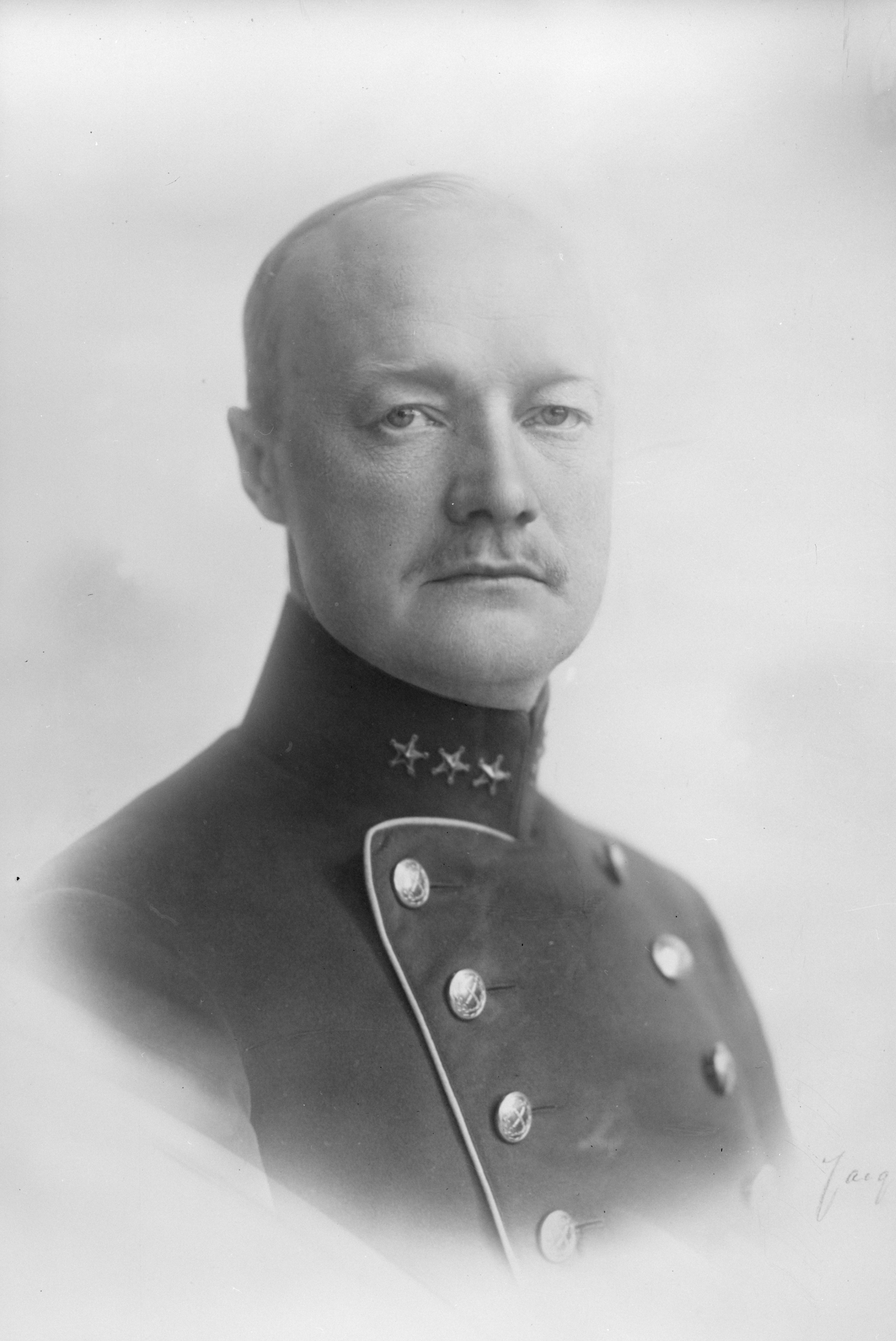
Ove Sylvan
(1934–1941)

== See also ==
- Swedish Army Fortifications Corps
