= Shlotburg =

Shlotburg (Dutch: Slotburg, German: Schlotburg, Russian: Шлотбург) was the name given by Peter the Great to Nyenschantz, a Swedish fortress of the 17th century. The name was sometimes used to denote all the downstream settlements and villages along the Neva River (including Saint Petersburg and the Peter and Paul fortress).

== History ==
The first written reference about Shlotburg dates back to 1703 and can be found in the first printed newspaper Vedomosti, established by Peter the Great. The term "slot" is Dutch for "castle" and the fortress was often referred to as a Castle Town. Some historians believe the name has German origin and is derived from the German word "schlot", which stands for "flue pass" or "neck" that undoubtedly refers to the neck of the Neva. In the spring of 1703, the Russian army besieged and captured a Swedish fortress called Nyenschantz situated on the right bank of the Neva and the settlement was renamed Shlotburg. The fort had been in the Russian hands for just a few weeks, when Peter I decided to build a new fortification near the site and to found a new city of St. Petersburg. Shortly afterwards, the Shlotburg fortress was razed to the grounds.
