= Boge Church =

Church in Gotland, Sweden

- Boge kyrka
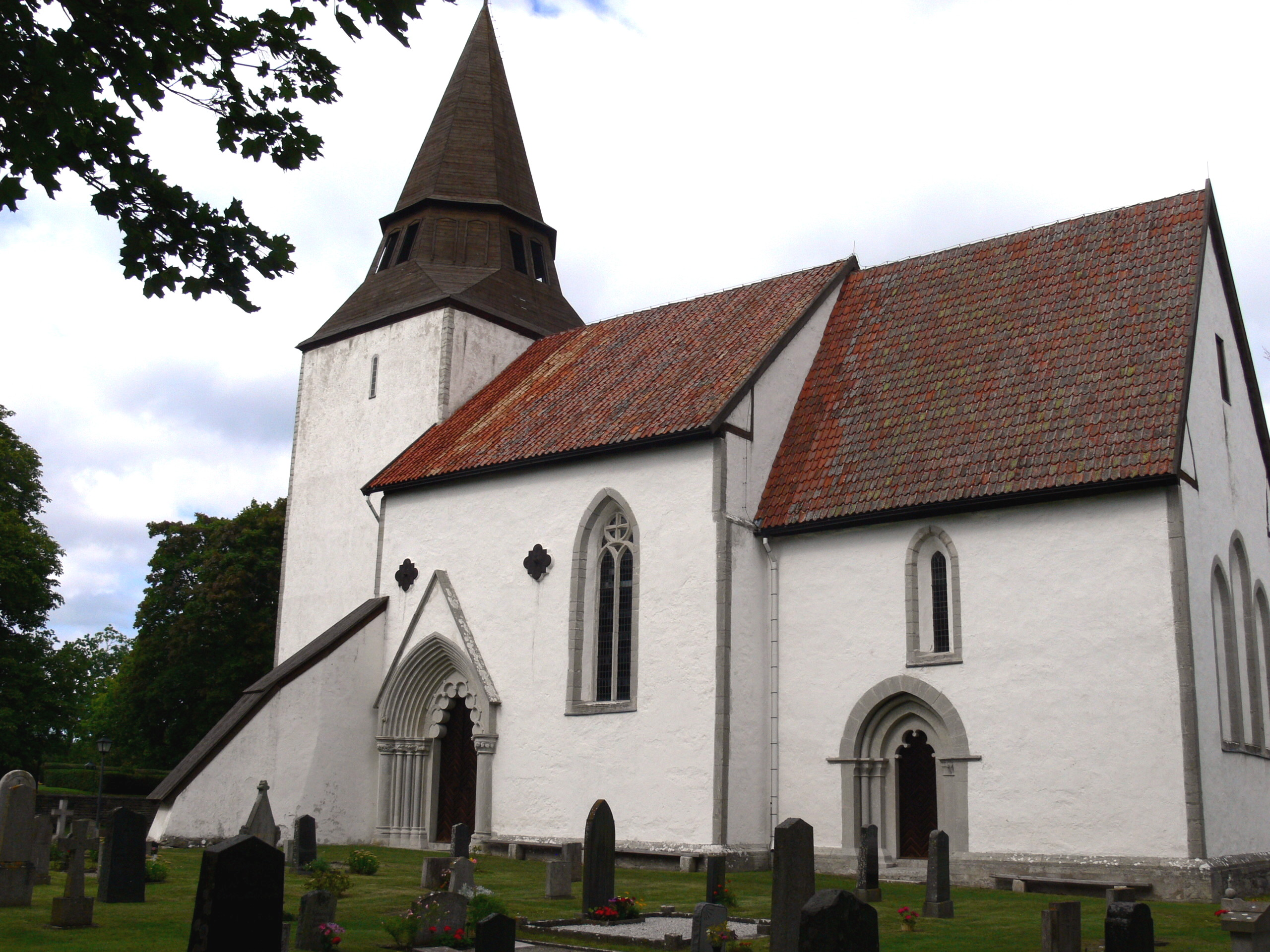
- Boge Church, view of the exterior

- Location on Gotland
- 57°41′13″N 18°45′46″E
- Country: Sweden
- Denomination: Church of Sweden

Administration
- Diocese: Visby

Boge Church (Swedish: Boge kyrka) is a medieval church in Boge not far from Slite on the Swedish island of Gotland. Its main construction period was during the 13th century, but the tower was rebuilt following its collapse in a storm during the 19th century. It contains sets of medieval murals. It belongs to the Church of Sweden and lies in the Diocese of Visby.

== History and architecture ==
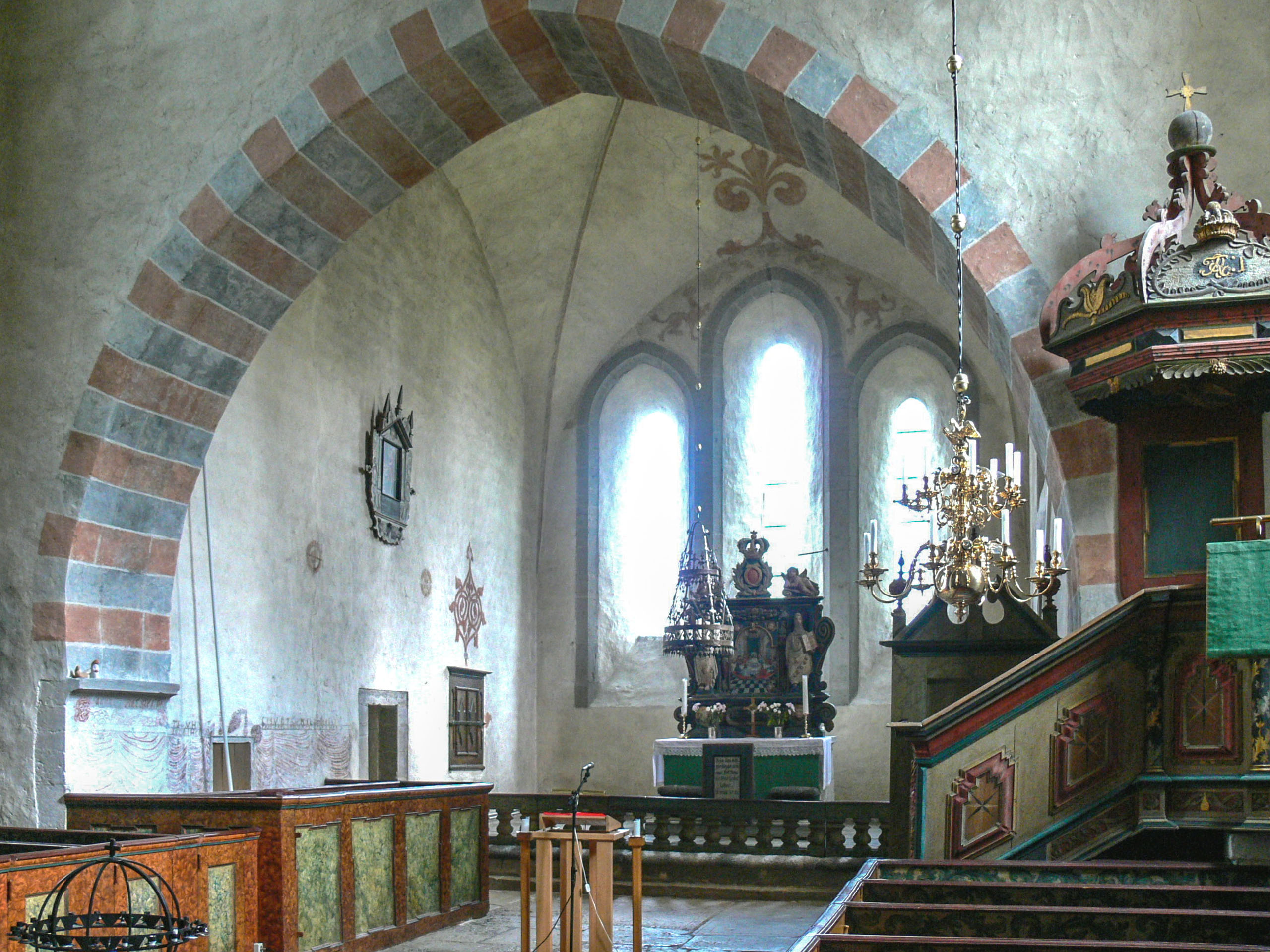
Interior, view of the choir

Boge Church is an early Gothic church. The oldest parts are the choir and the sacristy, dating from the mid-13th century. The nave is somewhat later, and replaced an earlier, Romanesque nave; this explains why the nave is unusually short and wide, as it was squeezed in between an existing tower and the choir. The tower seen today however dates from 1867 to 1892, as the old tower collapsed during a storm in 1857. On this occasion, the nave was also severely damaged, but likewise later reconstructed.

Externally, the church is supported by a single buttress, erected after the storm in 1857 to stabilise the church. The main portal is somewhat later than the rest of the building, and dates from the mid-14th century. Its capitals are decoratively sculpted.

Internally, the church is decorated with two sets of medieval murals dating from the construction period and the mid-15th century, respectively. The later ones are in the style of the so-called Master of the Passion of Christ. Most of the furnishings date from the 18th century, with the exception of the baptismal font (13th century) and a large, medieval iron chandelier. Some medieval tombstones are also visible in the choir.

The church belongs to the Church of Sweden and lies within the Diocese of Visby.
