= Listed buildings in Gotland County =

There are 350 listed buildings (Swedish: byggnadsminne) in Gotland County.

== Visby ==
placeholder

== Outside Visby ==
Image	Name	Premise	Number of buildings	Year built	Architect	Coordinates	ID
	Aner vattenkvarn	Boge Aner 3:2	1	Late 1800s		57.69231°N 18.76731°E	21300000014307
	Annas nöje	Östergarn Katthammars 1:14	6	1798		57.43830°N 18.84555°E	21300000014894
	Barlingbo prästgård	Barlingbo Prästgården 1:8	3	1902		57.56492°N 18.46366°E	21300000014305
	Bjärges i Lau	Lau Bjärges 1:39	4	1790s		57.28435°N 18.63264°E	21300000014746
	Boge sockenmagasin	Boge Annex 1:2	1	1857		57.68717°N 18.76332°E	21300000014310
	Bondans på Fårö	Fårö Bondans 1:13	7	1800s		57.96895°N 19.15296°E	21300000014652
	Boters linbastu	Anga Boters 1:37	1	1700s or older		57.47964°N 18.68279°E	21300000014295
	Bottarvegården	Vamlingbo Bottarve 1:26	3	1844		56.99188°N 18.24668°E	21300000014868
	Brucebo	Väskinde Stora Bläsungs 1:142, 1:24	6	Mid-1800s		57.68820°N 18.35240°E	21300000014875
	Bruhns vattenkvarn	Lye Lilllrone 1:3	3	1700s		57.30652°N 18.50129°E	21300000014762
	Burs fattigstuga	Burs S:7	2	1816		57.24236°N 18.51547°E	21300000014549
	Burs prästgård	Burs Prästgården 1:11 previously 1:1	9	1700s		57.24628°N 18.50759°E	21300000014551
	Buttle järnvägsstation	Buttle Buttlegårde 1:79	7	1878		57.40927°N 18.49061°E	21300000014559
	By i Eke	Eke By 1:1	5	1771		57.16328°N 18.39155°E	21300000014574
	Båtsman Valles torp	Lärbro Glästäde 1:16	2	1861		57.76054°N 18.77279°E	21300000014767
	Dalhems prästgård	Dalhem Prästgården 1:18 previously 1:1	4	1100s to 1500s		57.55313°N 18.53269°E	21300000014570
	Danielssons torp i Backhagen	Tingstäde Furubjärs 1:6	3	Early 1700s		57.74623°N 18.63751°E	21300000014857
	Donnerska huset i Klinte	Klinte Strands 1:144	2	1780s		57.38651°N 18.19959°E	21300000014721
	Dunbodi	Dalhem Kaungs 1:6	1	1904		57.55953°N 18.55479°E	21300000014566
	Duss	Bro Duss 1:3	4	1700s		57.67343°N 18.48640°E	21300000022279
	Endre prästgård	Endre Prästgården 1:10; f.d. 2:1	1	Mid-1700s		57.60961°N 18.46503°E	21300000014581
	Enholmen och batteriet Mojner	Boge Mojner 1:8, Othem Enholmen 1:1	5	1858		57.69479°N 18.81662°E	21300000016436
	Etelhems krukmakeri	Etelhem Tänglings 1:73	4	1889		57.32987°N 18.50803°E	21300000014583
