= Attack on Nyen (1658) =

Russian attack on Nyen

- Part of the Russo-Swedish War (1656–1658)
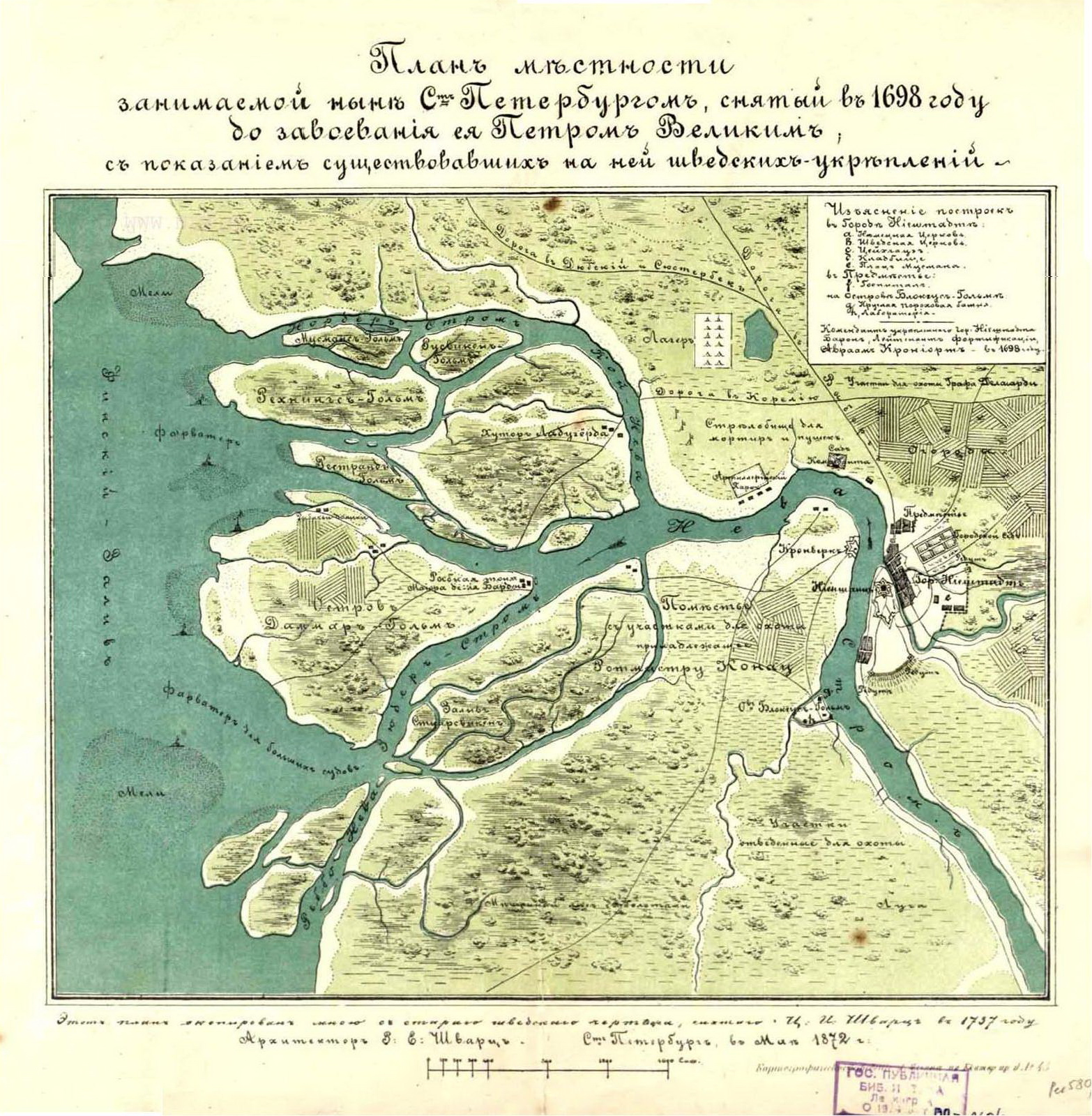
- Nyen as depicted on a Swedish map from 1698 by Baron Abraham Kroniort
Date	30–31 March, 1658
Location	Nyenschantz
Result	Swedish victory
Territorial changes	Russian forces repulsed from Nyen

Belligerents
(yes) Swedish Empire	Tsardom of Russia

Commanders and leaders
Unknown	(Tsardom of Russia) Ladyzhenskiy

Units involved
(Swedish Empire) Nyen redoubt	Unknown

Strength
At least 80 peasants	Unknown

Casualties and losses
Unknown	40 killed

The attack on Nyen (Swedish: Anfallet på Nyen; Russian: Нападение на Ниен) occurred from 30 to 31 March 1658, and it was the final action between Swedish and Russian forces during the Russo-Swedish War (1656–58).

== Background ==
On 30 March, the Russian general Ladyzhenskiy led a force from Lava (near Nöteborg) towards Nyen, but few details are known. The Russians intended to capture several fortresses in order to use them as collateral in the peace talks.

== Attack ==
Local peasants immediately alerted the Swedish garrison in Nyen about the Russian offensive, and some 80 participated in the Swedish defense of Nyen. Ladyzhenskiy sent scouts out during the night to find the best possible access routes through the new and well-built redoubts at Nyen, and they planted 12 small pennants to guide the assault. The next morning, on Tuesday, they attempted to storm the redoubt. Ladyzhenskiy's men managed to get past the outer defenses, after losing around 40 men in the fighting, but were not able to penetrate the inner defenses. After withdrawing, Lazyshenskiy shot mortars, which were loaded with stone projectiles, at the redoubt, before eventually marching back to Lava. The Russians also left the small pennants behind.

== Aftermath ==
The failed attack on Nyen was the final engagement of the war, although Swedish suspicions of a Russian offensive from the White Sea lingered in northern Finland. A month and a half later, a small force of Russian cavalry went to Nöteborg, with orders from the Tsar for the operations to cease.

== Works cited ==
- Lappalainen, Jussi T. (1979). Stade, Arne (ed.). Kriget på östfronten [The War on the Eastern Front] (in Swedish). Militärhistoriska förlaget. ISBN 9789185266098.
- Essen, Michael Fredholm von (2023). Charles X's Wars: Volume 3 - The Danish Wars, 1657-1660. Helion & Company. ISBN 9781915113603.
- Englund, Peter (2000). Den oövervinnerlige: om den svenska stormaktstiden och en man i dess mitt [The invincible: about the era of Swedish great power and a man in its midst] (in Swedish). Atlantis. ISBN 9789174869996.
