= Boge, Gotland =

Boge
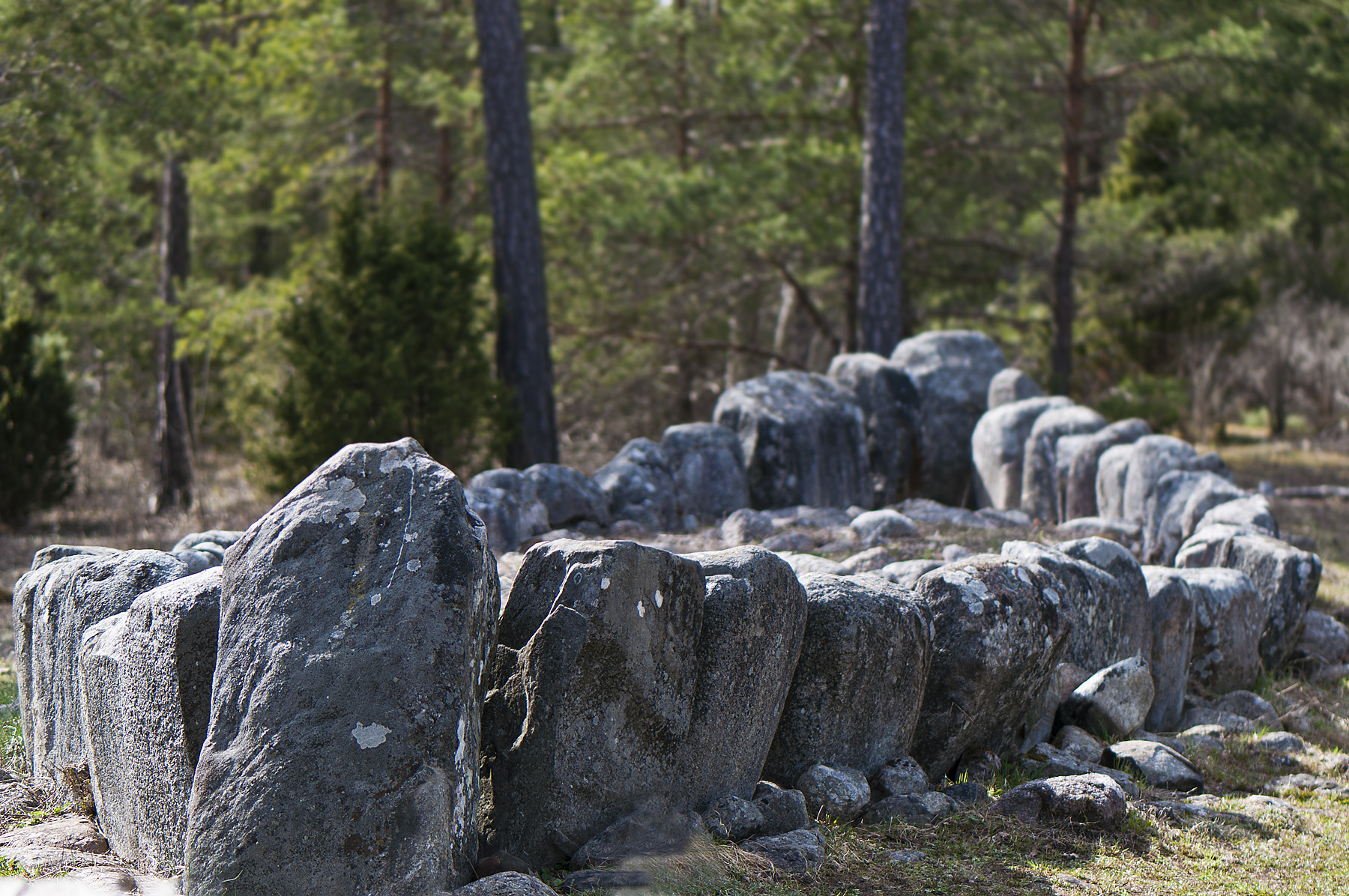
- Tjelvar's Grave in Boge

- Location within Gotland
- Coordinates: 57°41′13″N 18°45′46″E
- Country: Sweden
- Province: Gotland
- County: Gotland County
- Municipality: Gotland Municipality

Area
  - Total: 36.55 km^{2} (14.11 sq mi)

Population (2014)
  - Total: 259
- Time zone: UTC+1 (CET)
  - Summer (DST): UTC+2 (CEST)

Boge is a populated area, a socken (not to be confused with parish), on the Swedish island of Gotland. It comprises the same area as the administrative Boge District, established on 1 January 2016.

== Geography ==
Boge is the name of the socken as well as the district. It is also the name of the small village surrounding the medieval Boge Church, sometimes referred to as Boge kyrkby. It is situated on the northern east coast of Gotland. The south part of the locality Slite is located in the north part of Boge socken.

As of 2019, Boge Church belongs to Othem-Boge parish in Norra Gotlands pastorat, along with the churches in Slite and Othem.

== History ==
Boge is best known for one of the stone ships located in the area Tjelvar's Grave. The stone ship is 18 m (59 ft) long and 5 m (16 ft) wide. It dates from the Bronze Age. Close to it are two hillforts and a minor grave field. According to legend, the ship is the burial site of Tjelvar, the first Gotlander.
