= Slite Church =

- Slite kyrka
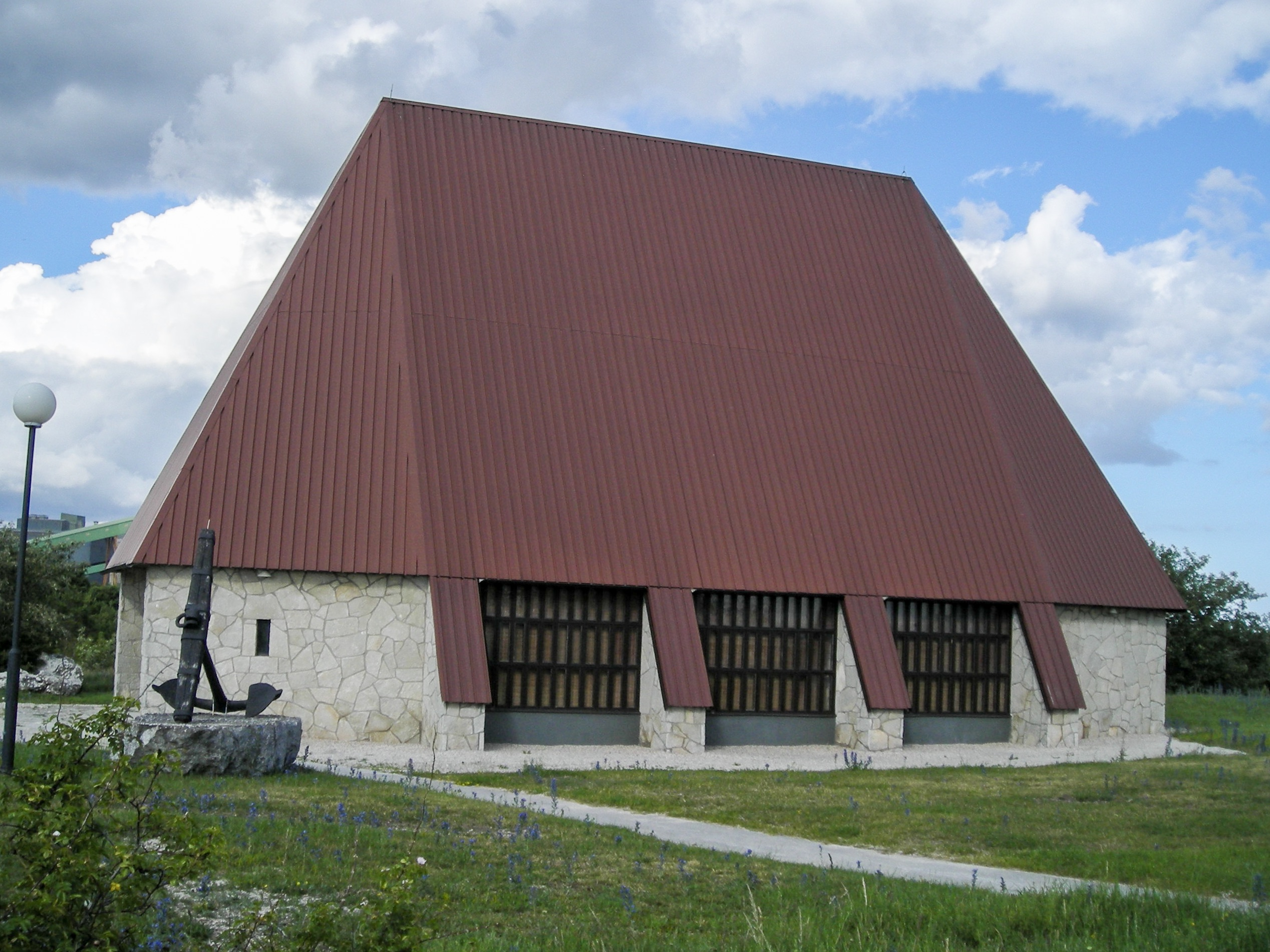
- Slite Church

- Location within Gotland
- 57°42′26″N 18°47′45″E
- Country: Sweden
- Denomination: Church of Sweden

Administration
- Diocese: Visby

Slite Church is a church in Slite, on the island of Gotland in Sweden.

The church was designed by the Danish architect Holger Jensen and built 1959–1960. It is built using only local materials such a pine wood and limestone. The rood cross and the sculpture of Mary are made by a local artist, Bertil Nyström.
