= Defence Act of 1936 (Sweden) =

The Defence Act of 1936 was a defence act passed by the Swedish Riksdag on 11 June 1936 which remained in effect until 17 June 1942.

== Background ==
The Act increased the yearly budget of the Swedish Armed Forces from 118 million SEK to 148 million, roughly 1.5% of the Swedish GDP. The budget of the Swedish Air Force received the largest increase in funding, bumping its previous allowance of 11 million crowns to 28 million. A domestic aircraft industry was taking shape during this time, composed of Svenska Aeroplan AB (SAAB) and AB Svenska Järnvägsverkstädernas Aeroplanavdelning. The Navy and Coastal Artillery branches were slightly expanded and modernised.

It was decided that certain Army infantry regiments were to be composed of one infantry and one armoured battalion each. At first, the Life Regiment Grenadiers (I 3) as well as the Skaraborg Regiment (I 9) were considered. In November, however, it was agreed that the Södermanland Regiment (I 10) would be reorganised instead of the Life Regimental Grenadiers (I 3). When Göta Life Guards (I 2) was disbanded in 1939, its armoured battalion was split into two battalions which were assigned to the Skaraborg Regiment (I 9) and the Södermanland Regiment (I 10).

The Air Force was significantly expanded with six air wings.

== Reorganisation ==
Reorganisation within the Armed Forces until the Defence Act of 1942:

- General Staff was disbanded in 1937.
- Defence Staff (Fst) was established in 1936.
- Army Staff (AS) was established in 1936.
- Air Staff (FS) was established in 1936.
- The Fortification Branch was split in 1937 into three corps; the Engineer Troops, the Signal Troops and the Swedish Army Fortifications Corps

=== Army ===
- The number of Army Divisions was increased from four to six.
  - I Army Division was established in Kristianstad.
  - II Army Division was established in Östersund.
  - III Army Division was established in Skövde.
  - IV Army Division was established in Stockholm.
  - Gotland Military Area was established in Visby.
  - Troops of Upper Norrland were established in Boden.
- Göta Life Guards (I 2) was disbanded in 1939.
- Fortress Battalion of the Kronoberg Regiment (I 11 K) was disbanded in 1939.

=== Air Force ===
- The Air Command, Karlsborg.
- The First Air Corps in Västerås is in 1936 reorganised into the Västmanland Wing (F 1).
- The Second Air Corps in Hägernäs is in 1936 reorganised into the Roslagen Wing (F 2).
- The Third Air Corps in Malmslätt is in 1936 reorganised into the Östgöta Wing (F 3).
- The Fourth Air Corps in Östersund is in 1936 reorganised into the Jämtland Wing (F 4).
- The Flight Academy in Ljungbyhed in 1936 is reorganised into the Swedish Air Force Flying School (F 5).
- Västgöta Wing (F 6) is established in 1939 in Karlsborg.
- Skaraborg Wing (F 7) is established in 1938 in Lidköping.
- Svea Wing (F 8) is established in 1938 in Stockholm.
- Göta Wing (F 9) is established in 1940 i Gothenburg (following a 1940 amendment).
- Scania Wing (F 10) is established in 1940 in Bulltofta (following a 1940 amendment).
- Södermanland Wing (F 11) was established in 1941 in Nyköping (following a 1940 amendment).
- Kalmar Wing (F 12) was established in 1942 in Kalmar (following a 1941 amendment).

=== Navy ===
- Gotland Coastal Artillery Corps (KA 3) was established in 1937 in Fårösund.
- Älvsborg Coastal Artillery Detachment (KA 4) was established in 1939 in Gothenburg.
