= Georg von Schwengeln =

Georg von Schwengeln (before his ennoblement Georgius Schwengell, c. 1590 – before May, 1669) was a cartographer and military officer from Livonia in Swedish service. He was born around 1590 and entered Swedish service following the Swedish conquest of Riga in 1621. Georg von Schwengeln was apparently first employed as a translator or interpreter from Polish, and went to Poland on missions for the Swedish Crown on several occasions. Gradually his duties shifted to mapmaking, and then to making plans and suggestions for improvements of fortresses and towns in the eastern part of the Swedish Empire. He was amply rewarded for his services, promoted to quartermaster general of the Swedish army in Livonia and ennobled. He was discharged with the rank of major general in 1661 and dies sometime between 1667 and May 1669.

== Biography ==
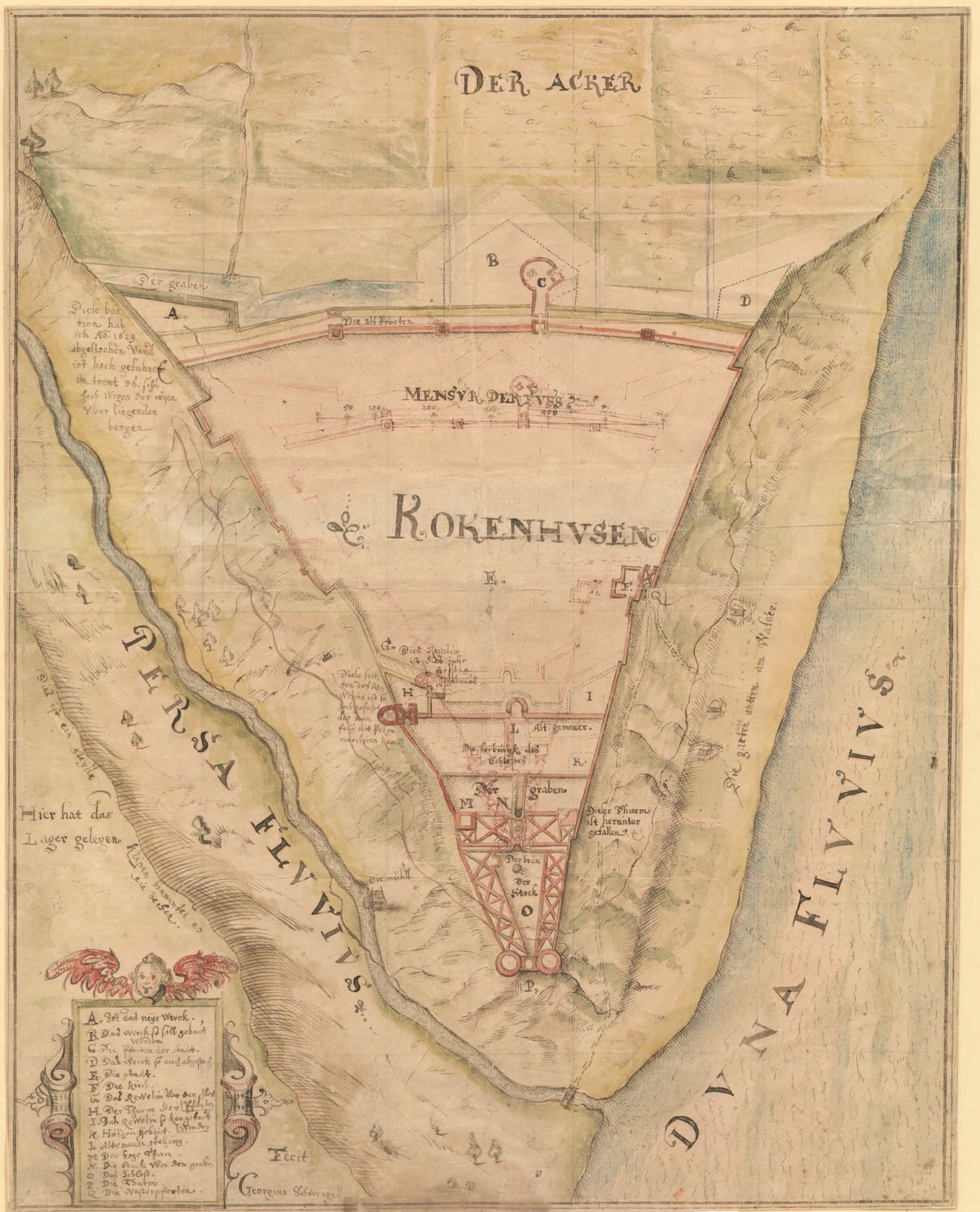
A plan of Koknese in present-day Latvia by Georg von Schwengeln from 1630. He provided a map of the city's fortifications in 1626 which aided the Swedish army in capturing the town.

Georg von Schwengeln was born sometime around 1590. In a preserved letter, he described himself in Latin as "Prutenus Civis Rigensis", i.e. Prussian and a citizen of Riga. He spoke German, Polish, understood Latin and perhaps had Estonian or a dialect of Latvian as his mother tongue. He had clearly received a systematic education, though it is not known how and where. He He made a depiction of the Swedish siege of Riga in 1621, which already showed his cartographic skill, and entered Swedish service shortly after the Swedish conquest of Riga; from 1623 his name appears in Swedish payrolls. At the time, Sweden was embroiled in the Polish–Swedish War of 1621–1625. Schwengeln was apparently first used as a translator or interpreter from Polish, and around 1625 he was sent to the Sejm of the Polish–Lithuanian Commonwealth to clandestinely observe its proceedings and report to the Swedes; apparently he had relatives who participated in the Sejm as deputies. The mission was not without risk, and his dedication was praised by the Field Marshal and Governor-General of Swedish Livonia, Jacob De la Gardie. He had also helped the Swedish army during its conquest of Koknese Castle, also in 1625, by providing a plan of its defensive fortifications to the king, Gustavus Adolphus. As a consequence, Schwengeln was given an annual salary of 500 Swedish riksdaler and the fief of a village in Livonia.

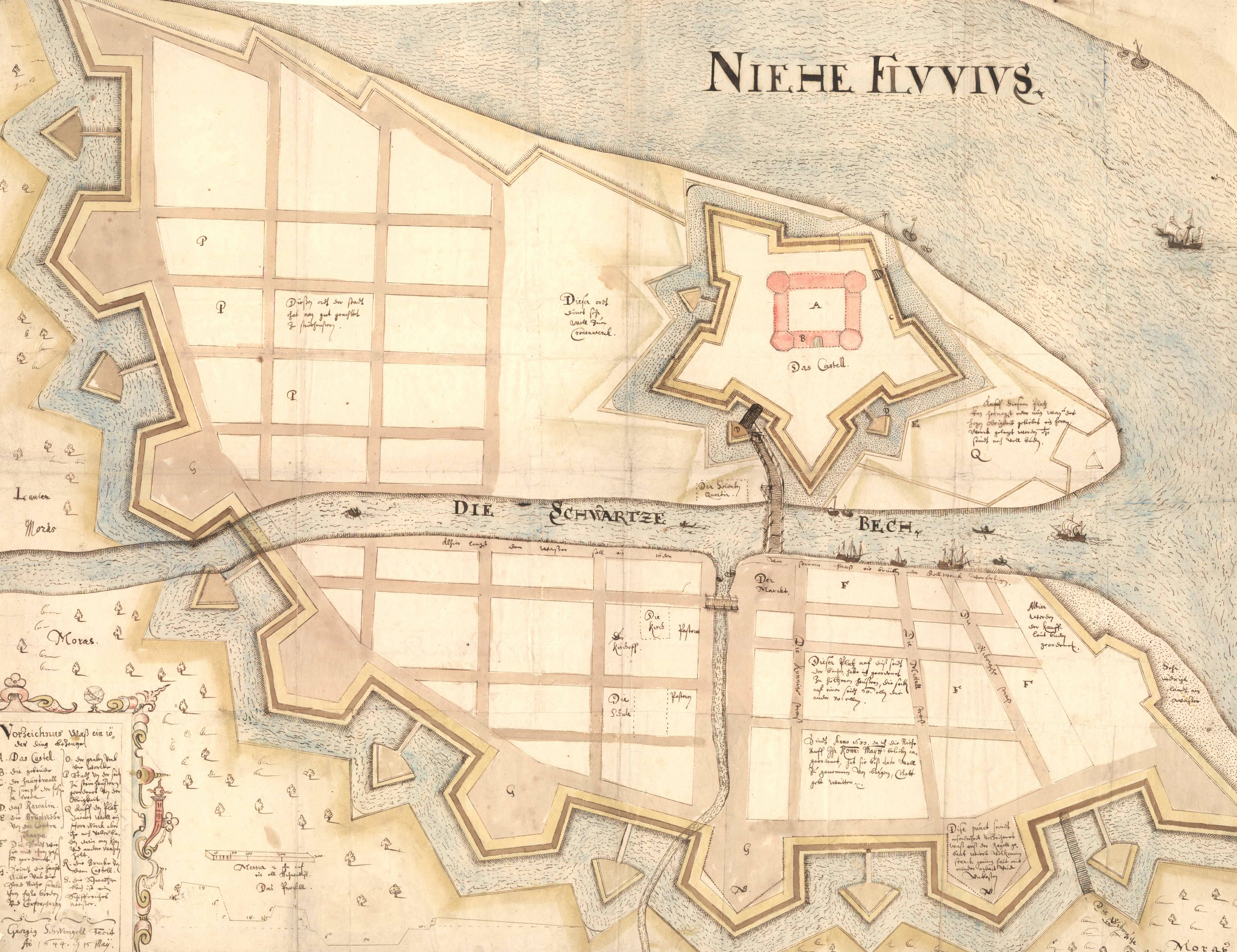
Plan of Nyenschantz, including a proposed expanded town plan and new defences, by Georg von Schwengeln (1644)

In 1672–1628, Georg von Schwengeln was sent on another mission to Poland, but from 1627 he was chiefly employed as a cartographer and mapmaker. In the following years he produced large-scale maps of several areas of the Baltic provinces, including Estonia, Semigallia and the island of Saarenmaa. In 1628, he was given the official title "geographicus" by the Swedish king.

In 1629, he was made "field quartermaster" of the Swedish army in Livonia. His tasks shifted focus to producing plans and proposals for improved fortifications of towns and forts in the eastern part of the Swedish Empire, including of Tartu, Narva, Kexholm and Nyenschantz. A letter to the king with proposals for new fortifications in Valmiera dated 1631 was sent from Warsaw, indicating that he was still occasionally on missions to Poland.

He was ennobled by the king in 1631, and in 1635 promoted to quartermaster general of the Livonian army. He was awarded more land, in the area around Tartu, and a payment for making maps in 1640. Another promotion was made in 1642 and Schwengeln given broader responsibilities in overseeing fortifications in the Baltic provinces. He soon came into conflict with Johan von Rodenburgh, who held the title of "engineer general" in Riga and whose responsibilities overlapped with those of Schwengeln. Schwengeln thus repeatedly asked for a new posting but was denied; by the mid-1650s Schwengeln was however in Finland with the tile of colonel and head of a cavalry regiment. At the end of Dano-Swedish War of 1658–1660, the regiment was disbanded and Georg von Schwengeln was discharged with the title of major general in 1661; presumably he thereafter settled on his estate. The last mention of him alive is in a letter from 1677; on 9 May 1699 he is mentioned in another letter as deceased.

== Role and importance ==
Swedish cartography developed during the early 17th century, particularly under the guidance of Anders Bure, but there was little domestic tradition of mapmaking. Experience and knowledge had to be imported, both from the Low Countries and the present-day Baltic States. In the latter region, both the Teutonic Order and the Livonian Order had a tradition of surveying and mapmaking going back to the 15th century. Georg von Schwengeln's employment by the Swedish Crown can thus be seen as one example of how the administration made an effort to incorporate know-how and experience from the region's more well-established knowledge-base. His career is also testament to the openness of the Swedish Crown to offer knowledgeable foreigners good opportunities.

== Sources cited ==
- Köhlin, Harald (1949). "Georg von Schwengeln and His Work, 1620-1645". Imago Mundi. 6: 67–72.
- Mead, William R. (2007). "60. Scandinavian Renaissance Cartography". In Woodward, David (ed.). The History of Cartography, Volume 3. Cartography in the European Renaissance (PDF). Chicago University Press. ISBN 0-226-90734-1.
- Sparitis, Ojars (2009). "Some aspects of cultural interaction between Sweden and Latvian part of Livonia in the 17. century". Baltic Journal of Art History (1): 79–103.
- Tollin, Clas (2004). "When Sweden was Put on the Map". In Palang, Hannes; Sooväli, Helen; Antrop, Marc; Setten, Gunhild (eds.). European Rural Landscapes. Persistence and Change in a Globalising Environment. Springer Dordrecht. pp. 191–208. ISBN 978-0-306-48512-1.
