= Swedish Army Fortifications Corps =

- Fortifikationskåren
- Active: 1937–1962
- Country: Sweden
- Allegiance: Swedish Armed Forces
- Branch: Swedish Army
- Type: Administrative corps/Personnel branch
- Role: Military engineering
- Size: c. 50 people

Commanders
- Notable commanders: Ove Sylvan

The Swedish Army Fortifications Corps (Swedish: Fortifikationskåren, FortK) was an administrative corps of the Swedish Army from 1937 to 1962 when it became part of the Defence Staff. The corps provided the Swedish Armed Forces with specially trained personnel for building and property management service.

== History ==
The Swedish Army Fortifications Corps was established in 1937 (SFS 1937:673). The corps constituted of an administrative corps belonging to the Swedish Army with the task of providing the Swedish Armed Forces with specially trained personnel for building and property management service. In this capacity, the Chief of the Swedish Army Fortifications Corps reported to the Chief of the Army. He was also head of the Fortification Board of the Royal Swedish Army Materiel Administration and in 1937 also became Inspector General of Swedish Fortifications (Inspektör över rikets befästningar) in terms of fortification arrangements. The Office of the Inspector General of Fortifications (Befästningsinspektionen) was amalgamated with the Fortifikationsförvaltningens befästningsbyrå on 1 May 1948 but became independent again on 1 October 1958. On 1 January 1962, it was amalgamated with the Defence Staff. The Swedish Army Fortifications Corps was a separate organizational unit within the Defence Staff until 1 February 1990. Subsequently, its tasks were transferred to the Personnel Management (Personalledningen).

== Chiefs ==
- 1934–1941: Ove Sylvan
- 1941–1943: Nils Carlquist (acting)
- 1943–1948: Nils Carlquist
- 1948–1956: Kjell Magnell
- 1956–1963: Erik Lidström
- 1963–1967: Allan Edebäck
- 1967–1971: Sven Erik Fahlander
- 1972–1978: Harald Schibbye
- 1978–1983: Bertil Runnberg
- 1983–1990: Sven Karevik

== See also ==
- Swedish Fortification Corps
