= Fårösund Fortress =

Fortification on Gotland, Sweden

- Fårösunds fästning
- Fårösund in Sweden
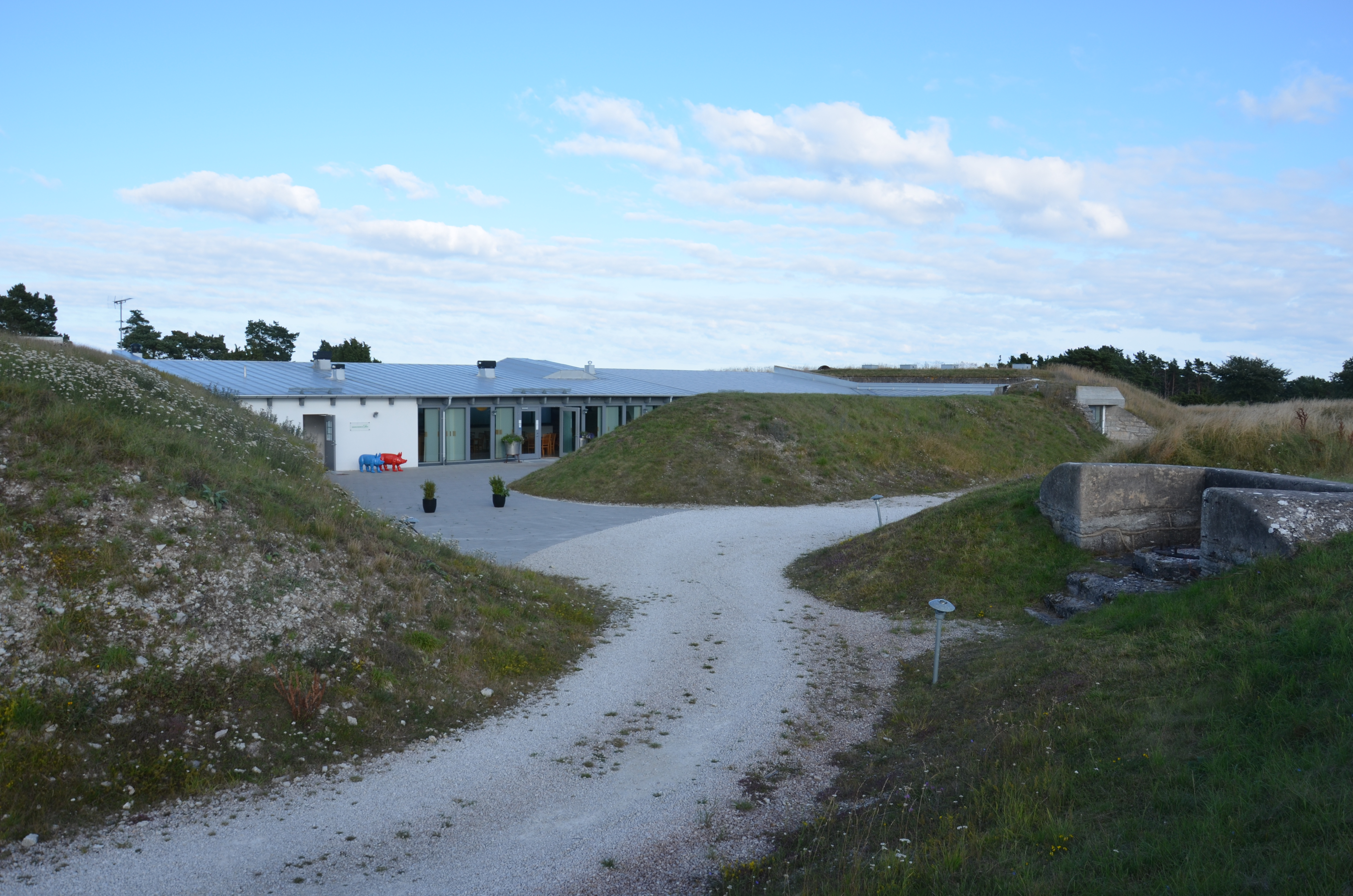
- Fårösund Fortress, 2012

Site information
- Type: Fortification
- Owner: Swedish Fortifications Agency (–1993); National Property Board (1993–)
- Controlled by: Sweden

Location
- Coordinates: 57°50′46″N 19°04′45″E

Site history
- Built: 1885–1886
- In use: 1886–1919

Garrison information
- Garrison: Gotland garrison

Fårösund Fortress (Swedish: Fårösunds fästning) is a decommissioned fortification in Fårösund on Gotland, Sweden, which was built from 1885 to 1886.

== History ==
Sweden's capacity to protect its neutrality was questioned after the Crimean War 1854–56. England and France persuaded Sweden to fortify the inlet at Fårö with artillery batteries and naval mines. The fortress was built from 1885 to 1886 and consisted of three fixed batteries; Central Battery (batt. I), Northern Battery (batt. II) and Southern Battery (batt. III). At the turn of the century, the batteries were reconstructed. The batteries I and II were given modern quick-firing 57 mm guns, four per battery. Fårösund Fortress, which was name of the coastal position from 1915, was disbanded as such on 30 September 1919, and the coastal artillery detachment was relocated to Vaxholm Fortress and all equipment was removed. After the fortress was closed down and was taken over by the Swedish Prison and Probation Service in 1919, a penitential center was establishment. The fortress had been proposed as a detention center for social dangerous offenders, if and when legislation for such came about. No such laws did arise and the entire fortress was declared a listed building in 1935.

In 1993, the National Property Board of Sweden took over the administration of the batteries which until that date had belonged to the Swedish Fortifications Agency. Under the company name Fårösund Fästning AB, with business owner Peter Alvérus, it began in 2004 to build a hotel in and around battery I. The company went bankrupt on 15 September 2004 before construction was completed and the National Property Board completed the construction work. During 2005–2006 the facility was leased to Björn Gustafsson. In 2008, Pontus Fritiof through the Pontus Group took over the hotel and conference facility Fårösund Fästning AB together with the tenant Björn Gustafsson. On 17 October 2012, Fårösunds fästning hotell och restaurang AB filed for bankruptcy at Stockholm District Court. The bankruptcy auction expired after bankruptcy trustee brought about a complete transfer of operations of the business and inventory to the new-old owner Peter Alvérus. Since autumn 2012, Fårösunds Fästning AB is run by Alvérus and Cian Bornebusch.

== Commandants ==
- 1915-1919: Erik Ekström

== Gallery ==
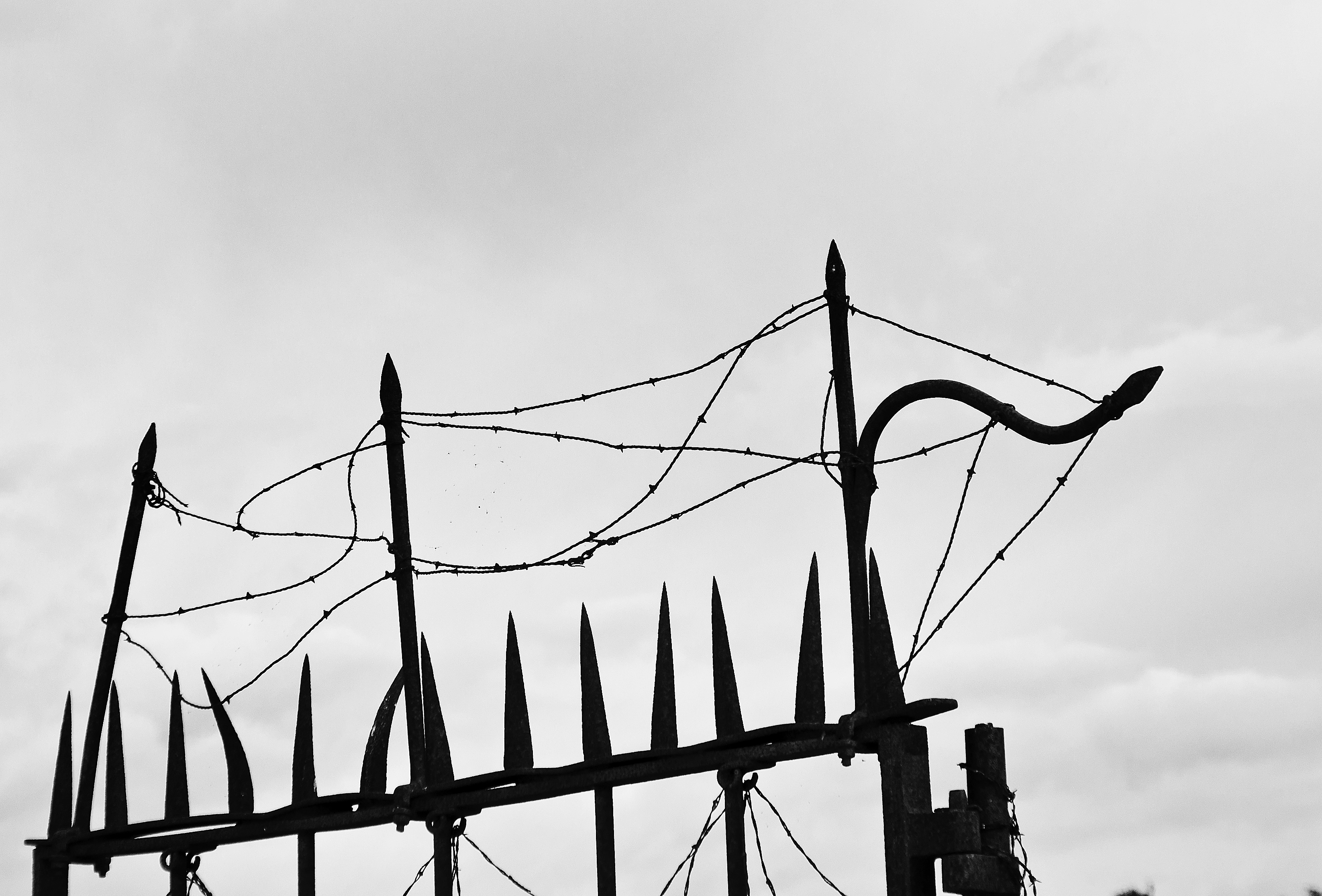
Central Battery.

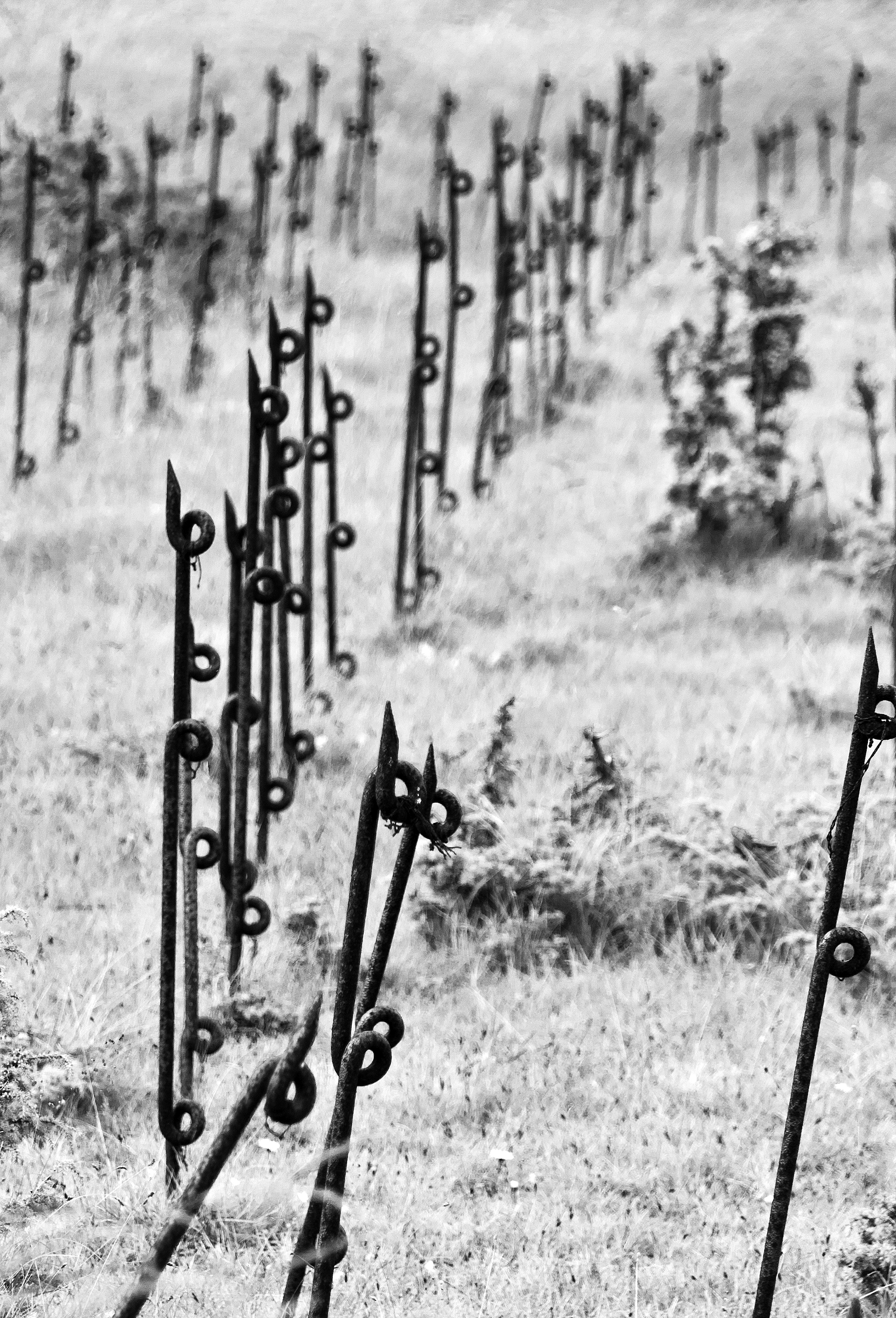
Central Battery.

== See also ==
- Karlsvärd Fortress
