= Slite =

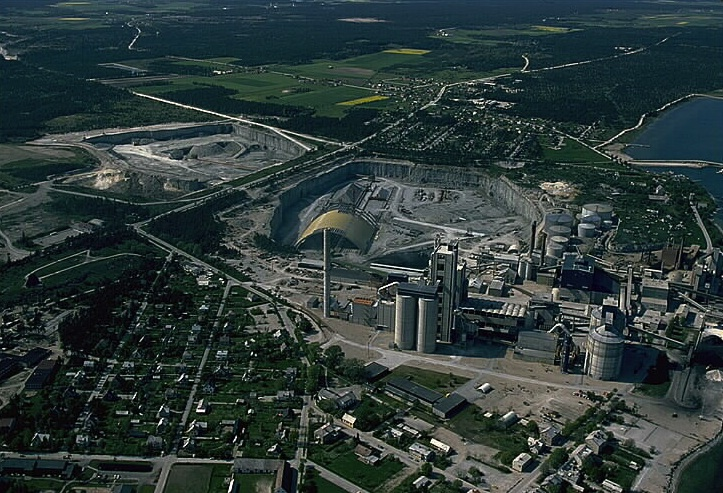
- 1980 aerial view of Slite

- Location within Gotland
- Coordinates: 57°43′N 18°48′E
- Country: Sweden
- Province: Gotland
- County: Gotland County
- Municipality: Gotland Municipality

Area
  - Total: 2.51 km^{2} (0.97 sq mi)

Population (31 December 2014)
  - Total: 1,500
- Time zone: UTC+1 (CET)
  - Summer (DST): UTC+2 (CEST)
- Website: www.slite.nu

Slite is a locality situated in Gotland Municipality, Gotland County, on the island of Gotland, Sweden with 1,500 inhabitants in 2014.

== Geography ==
Slite is situated on the northern east coast of Gotland. The town is divided by the Sjuströmmar inlet, connecting Bogevik bay with the Baltic Sea. The north, and main part, of the town is situated in Othem socken and the part south of Sjuströmmar is in Boge socken.

Outside Slite is a small archipelago called Slite skärgård. The largest island is Asunden with its protected stack area. Close to the south tip of Asunden is the smaller Grunnet island. The island closest to Sjuströmmar is Enholmen where Karlsvärd Fortress is situated.

High on a cliff in the north part of Slite is the modern Slite Church built in 1959–60. It is designed by Danish architect Holger Jensen. As of 2019, Slite Church belongs to Othem-Boge parish in Norra Gotlands pastorat, along with the churches in Othem and Boge.

== History ==
For a long time Slite was an important place for trade and business; nowadays tourism is an important source of income along with the stone and gravel industry, producing concrete from raw material of limestone from nearby quarries. The landscape outside Slite is dominated by the Heidelberg Materials Cement Sverige AB limestone quarry .

In 1902–1953, Slite was connected to Roma by the 33 km (21 mi) Slite-Roma railway.

== Events ==
The annual Slite Market is the first of the major autumn markets on Gotland. There are five official markets held on the island in August–October: Slite, Havdhem, Kräklingbo, Klintehamn and Hemse, each usually spanning a weekend.
