= Nyenschantz =

17th century Swedish fortress

Coordinates: 59°56′39″N 30°24′25″E

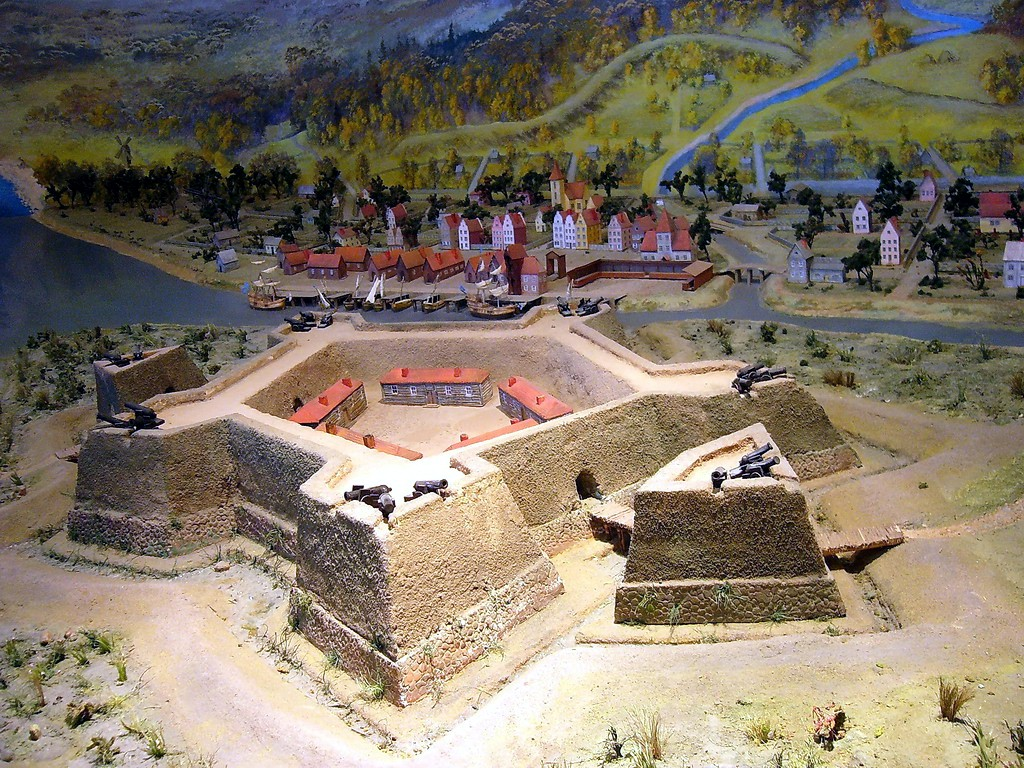
Model reconstruction of Nyenschantz and Nyen, which shows the fortress from the west.

Nyenschantz (Swedish: Nyenskans, lit. 'Neva sconce'; Russian: Ниеншанц, romanized: Niyenshants; Finnish: Nevanlinna) was a Swedish fortress at the confluence of the Neva River and Okhta River, the site of present-day Saint Petersburg, Russia. Nyenschantz was built in 1611 to establish Swedish rule in Ingria, which had been annexed from the Tsardom of Russia during the Time of Troubles. The town of Nyen, which formed around Nyenschantz, became a wealthy trading center and a capital of Swedish Ingria during the 17th century. In 1702, Nyenschantz and Nyen were conquered by Russia during the Great Northern War, and the new Russian capital of Saint Petersburg was established here by Peter the Great the following year.

== History ==
=== The fortress Landskrona ===
During excavations in 1992–2000, the remnants of three different medieval fortresses were found at the site of the Nyenschantz fortress. The only one known historically is the Swedish fortress Landskrona, built in 1300 by Tyrgils Knutsson, the Lord High Constable of Sweden. Landskrona was an enormous and unusually well-fortified wooden fortress with eight towers. In the spring of 1301, the Russians amassed a large army and laid siege to the fortress. The Swedes retreated to the basement when a fire broke out inside the fortress. The last of the Swedish defenders were captured, and the Russians burned down the fortress.

=== Background ===
In 1609, the Treaty of Viborg was signed by Sweden and Tsardom of Russia as a package of military agreements that were supposed to be mutually beneficial. It was signed by King Charles IX of Sweden and Vasili IV (also known as Vasily Shuisky) of Russia in the Swedish city of Viborg, located on the Karelian Isthmus close to Russian territory. The treaty came at an unstable period in Russian history known as the Time of Troubles, where the death of the last Tsar from the long-ruling Rurikid dynasty Feodor I in 1598 led to decades of civil war. In 1606, following the death of unpopular (and allegedly illegitimate) Tsar Boris Godunov, ascension to throne and subsequent murder of pretender False Dmitry I, Vasily Shuisky came to power, triggering a conflict with yet another pretender to the Russian throne, False Dmitry II. Additionally, Russia began fighting the Polish–Russian War following the invasion of the country by the Polish–Lithuanian Commonwealth the same year. Sweden itself was fighting against the Poles in the Polish–Swedish War and viewed their eastward expansion into Russian lands as a security threat. The terms of the Treaty of Viborg stipulated that Sweden would supply a corps of mercenaries to Shuisky to fight False Dmitry II and the Poles in exchange for Swedish control of the nearby strategic Korela Fortress, as well as its town Kexholm and the respective county. Shuisky agreed to the terms but was an unpopular ruler with little power. Shortly after signing the Treaty of Viborg, Russia's fortunes began to rise, and Shuisky was forced out of power in 1610. A coalition between Swedish general Jacob de la Gardie and Russian princes launched the De la Gardie Campaign, effectively defeating False Dmitry II.

=== Nyenskans ===
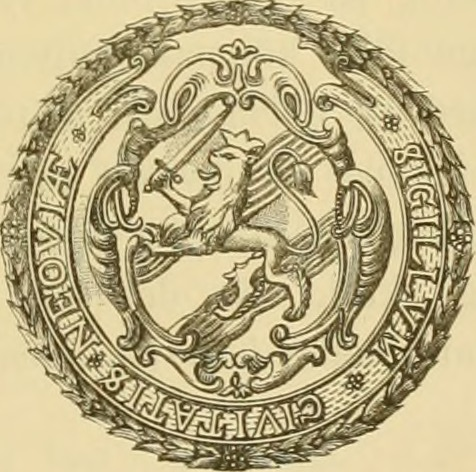
Drawing of the seal of Nyenskans by Carl von Bonsdorff from 1891.

The Ingrian War was triggered in 1610 as the new stability of Russia led to increased resistance to Polish occupation and Swedish influence in the country. As the Polish occupation of Moscow had ended, Russia began to actively resist the Swedish influence as they sought to regain control over occupied territories, including the province of Ingria, which Sweden insisted on keeping based on Russia violating conditions in the Treaty of Viborg. Sweden constructed a fortress in Ingria at a strategic position at the confluence of the prominent Neva River and one of its tributaries, the Okhta River. The new fort was officially named Nyenskans, derived from the Swedish terms Nyen-, the name for the Neva, and -skans meaning "bastion", and was capable of housing 500 people. The Ingrian War ended in Swedish victory in 1617 after the signing of the Treaty of Stolbovo, resulting in Russia ceding the territories to Sweden. In 1632, the settlement of Nyen was developed across the Okhta from Nyenskans, which was granted town privileges and became the administrative centre of Swedish Ingria in 1642. By the mid-17th century, Nyen had prospered as a trading hub with around 2,000 people, making it much more prominent and wealthier than Swedish Ingria's new capital, Nöteborg. According to church records, the town's population was primarily made up of Finns, secondarily Swedes, and some Germans. Around this time, Nyen's governor, John Geselia the Younger, banned Orthodox Christian Swedish subjects from settling in or near the town following tensions with Lutherans. The ban on Orthodox residents effectively cleansed Nyen of ethnic Russian, Izhorian, and Karelian inhabitants.

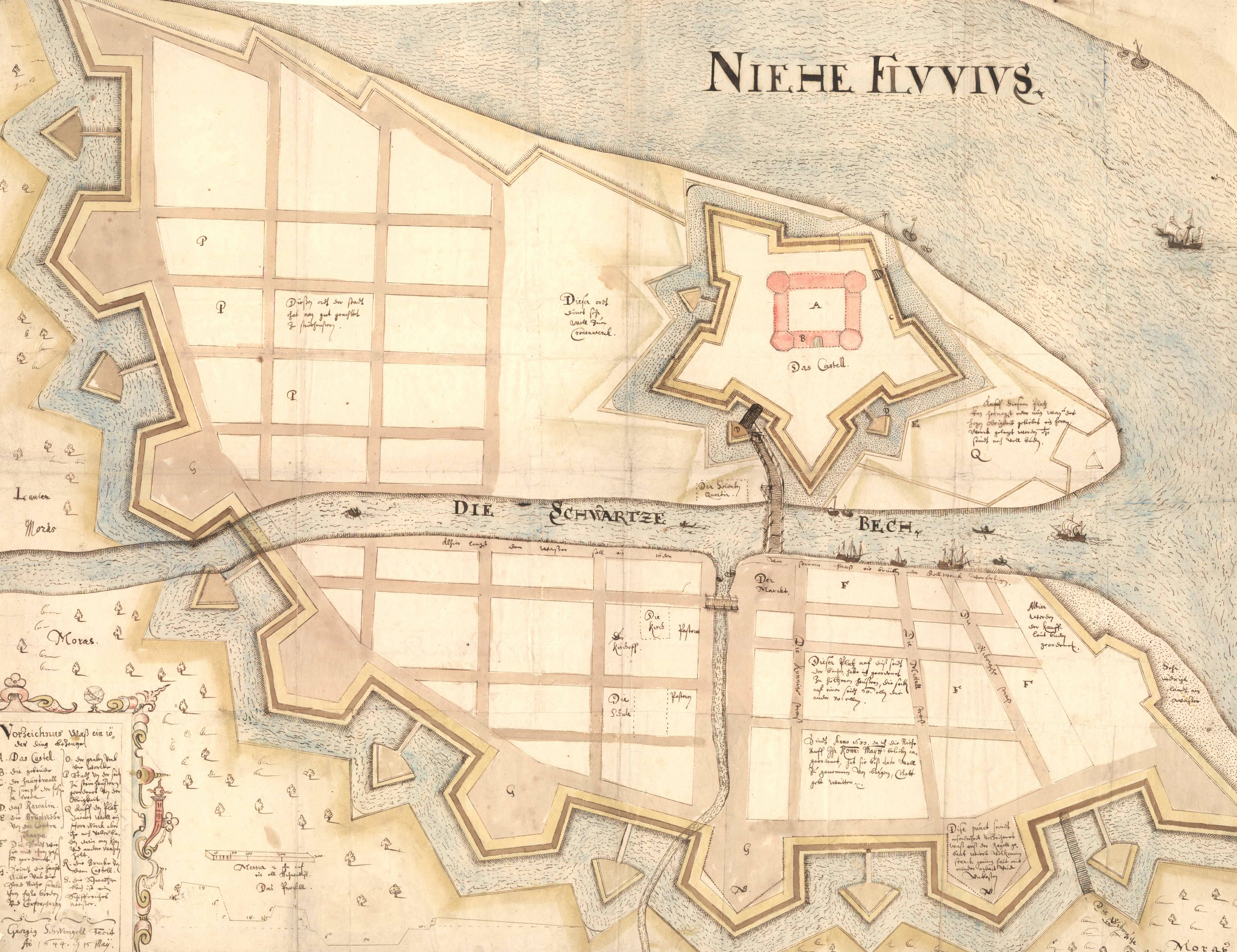
Plan of Nyenskans, including a proposed expanded town plan and new defences, by Georg von Schwengeln (1644)

In 1656, Nyenskans was attacked by Russia during an invasion led by Pyotr Potemkin. The attack was repelled, but it badly damaged Nyen, and Sweden moved the administrative centre of Swedish Ingria from Nöteborg to Narva.

In 1677, the defences of Nyenskans and Nyen were enforced by a ring of new fortifications consisting of lunettes with batteries and moats. By the end of the 17th century, Nyenskans entered its final form after it had been modernized by an extensive project led by engineer Heinrich von Soylenberg. The fort was expanded to house 600 people, converted into a star fort featuring five wooden and earthen bastions, two additional ravelins, crownworks along the bastions not pointing towards the rivers, and a smaller accompanying half-fort built on the opposite bank of the Neva. Upon the completion of the project, Nyenskans was thought by Sweden to be the most modern fortress in the world at the time. By the turn of the 18th century, numerous Swedish and Finnish suburban manors were built outside the Nyen fortification ring. Most were along the Neva, some of which were located at a considerable distance from the city.

In 1700, the danger of Russian invasion increased following the beginning of the Great Northern War, which resumed formal hostilities between Sweden and Russia. Reportedly, in October 1702, Sweden feared an imminent Russian invasion of Nyen, evacuating the city's population and burning it down to prevent the Russians from taking it.

=== Saint Petersburg ===
On May 1, 1703, Sweden lost Nyenskans to the Russians when the fortress was taken by Peter the Great during the Ingrian campaign of the Great Northern War. The site of Nyenskans and Nyen was reformed by Peter into the new city of Schlötburg, meaning "Neck-town" in German, a reference to the long, narrow section of the Neva where it was located, with "Schlöt" corresponding to "(funnel) neck, narrows, chimney". Schlötburg stood in contrast to Shlisselburg ("Key-town"), the new name for Nöteborg at the other end of the Neva River, which Peter believed was the "Key to Ingria". The last Swedish commandant of Nyenskans was Colonel Johan Apolloff, who was preceded by Colonel Alexander Pereswetoff-Morath, a descendant of Russian noblemen, boyars, who had entered Swedish service in the first decades of the 17th century. Nyenskans, under the name Schlötburg, functioned in Russian service only for some weeks before it was retired as an active military garrison.

In 1703, Peter decided to found Saint Petersburg, a brand new capital city for the Tsardom of Russia, from scratch in the Neva River delta on the land around Nyenskans. Peter had disliked Moscow, Russia's largest city and historical capital, which he considered inconveniently located and too isolated from the rest of Europe. He also had an interest in seafaring and maritime affairs, believing Russia needed a new port city to replace Arkhangelsk, which he similarly considered to be inconveniently located. Technically, the land still officially belonged to Sweden and was occupied during fighting in the Great Northern War, but despite this, construction of the city began anyway.

The exact fate of Nyenskans is unknown, with sources ranging from its almost complete demolition as early as 1704 to its repurposing and remaining intact as late as the 1760s. Other documents and maps suggest Nyenskans was gradually demolished over the following decades as Saint Petersburg expanded onto the land in the direct vicinity of the fort. By 1849, the central strengthening of Nyenskans was still known to exist, although the exact date of its demolition is also unknown.

Today, nothing above the ground remains of Nyenskans, and the site is now in Saint Petersburg's Krasnogvardeysky District. On June 15, 2000, a monument designed by V. A. Reppo was opened on the site of the fortress. In May 2003, on the 300th anniversary of Saint Petersburg, the museum "700 years: Landskrona, the Neva Mouth, Nyenschantz" was opened at the site of the fortress. In early 2007, the remains of Nyenskans' bastions were identified during archaeological excavations, which were necessitated by the threat of irrecoverable exploitation of the entire site to development from the territory of demolished shipyard Petrozavod to the grounds for planned skyscraper headquarters of the Moscow-based national natural gas monopoly Gazprom, Okhta Center, that would dwarf the beautiful cityscape. This caused protests from the city conservation activists, but they defended the location only after archeologists found remains of the star fort and preceding structures. Gazprom eventually moved the construction site to the northwest outskirt of the city Lakhta (from Finnish lahti "bay, inlet"), and the skyscraper crosscut as a star fort is now known as Lakhta Center. It may also hold public activity and leisure spaces as well as offices.

== See also ==
- Vauban
- Okhta Center
- Treaty of Nystad
