= List of Swedish Army lieutenant generals after 1900 =

This is a list of lieutenant generals in the Swedish Army since 1900. The grade of lieutenant general (or three-star general (Note: Until 1972, a Swedish lieutenant general was a two-star rank.)) is ordinarily the second-highest in the peacetime Army, ranking above major general and below general. The lieutenant general was originally the general's deputy (locum tenens) or closest man. The lieutenant general was usually the commander of a division.

Historically, during the 20th century, some major generals were promoted to lieutenant general, and some lieutenants general were promoted to full general in connection with their retirement and thus never served in their new rank.

== List of lieutenant generals ==
Entries are indexed by the numerical order in which each officer was appointed to that rank while on active duty, or by an asterisk (*) if the officer did not serve in that rank while on active duty. Each entry lists the officer's name, date of rank, date the officer vacated the active-duty rank, number of years on active duty as lieutenant general (Yrs), (Note: The number of years on active duty as lieutenant general is taken to be the number of days rounded to the nearest whole year and excluding any gaps in appointment.) positions held as lieutenant general, and other biographical notes. (Note: Biographical notes include years of birth and death; dates of promotion to higher permanent grade; and other unusual career events such as death in office or resignation.)

	Name	Photo	Date of rank	Date vacated	Yrs	Position	Notes	Ref
1	Hampus Elliot		21 Jan 1901	1903	3	Commander, Swedish Fortification Corps, 1891–1903.	(1835–1905)	
2	Gustaf Anton Bråkenhielm		7 Jun 1901	1 Jul 1904	3	Commander, 1st Army Division, 1896–1904.	(1837–1922)	
3	Jesper Crusebjörn		7 Jun 1901	27 Jul 1903	2	Minister for War, 1899–1903.	(1843–1904)	
4	Hemming Gadd		12 Aug 1902	8 Nov 1905	3	Commander, 4th Army Division, 1896–1905.; Commandant General in Stockholm, 1905–1905.	(1837–1915) Promoted to general, 1905	
5	Carl Munck		12 Aug 1902	7 Nov 1902	0	Commander, 2nd Army Division, 1893–1902.	(1836–1905)	
6	Carl Wilhelm Ericson		23 Aug 1902	23 Feb 1906	4	Inspector of the Swedish Army Service Troops, 1903–1906.	(1840–1928)	
8	Prince Carl, Duke of Västergötland		30 Sep 1904	1908	4	Inspector of the Swedish Cavalry, 1898–1912.	(1861–1951) Promoted to general, 1908	
8	Carl Warberg		1905	1910	5	Commander, 4th Army Division, 1905–1910.; Commandant General in Stockholm, 1905–1910.	(1845–1910) Died in office.	
9	Wilhelm Stjernstedt		1905	1907	2	Commander, 5th Army Division, 1899–1907.	(1841–1919)	
10	Carl Axel Nordenskjöld		1908	1911	3	Commander, 3rd Army Division, 1902–1911.	(1846–1924)	
11	Gustaf Uggla		1908	1913	5	Commander, 2nd Army Division, 1902–1913.	(1846–1924) Promoted to general, 1913	
*	Gustaf Björlin		11 Dec 1908	11 Dec 1908	0	–.	(1845–1922)	
12	Knut Gillis Bildt		28 Oct 1910	14 Jul 1919	9	Chief of the General Staff, 1905–1919.	(1854–1927) Promoted to general, 14 Jul 1919	
13	Fredrik Leth		30 Sep 1910	1915	5	Master-General of the Ordnance, 1903–1915.	(1850–1919)	
14	Axel von Matern		27 Oct 1911	2 Jul 1915	4	Commander, 1st Army Division, 1904–1915.	(1848–1920)	
15	Lars Tingsten		1913	1922	9	Commander, 2nd Army Division, 1913–1914.; Inspector of the Infantry, 1914–1919.; Chief of the General Staff, 1919–1922.	(1857–1937) Promoted to general, 1922.	
16	Olof Malm		20 May 1914	30 Mar 1917	3	Commander, 5th Army Division, 1911–1917.	(1851–1939)	
17	Edvard Brändström		20 May 1914	1920	6	Envoy extraordinaire and minister plénipotentiaire at the Russian Imperial Court, 1906–1920.	(1850–1921)	
*	Fredrik Holmquist		10 Apr 1915	10 Apr 1915	0	–.	(1847–1927)	
*	Ludvig Munthe		10 Apr 1915	10 Apr 1915	0	–.	(1849–1937)	
18	Christofer von Platen		1915	1915	0	Commander, 3rd Army Division, 1911–1917.	(1852–1924)	
19	Hugo Jungstedt		9 Mar 1917	28 Mar 1919	2	Inspector of the Militärläroverken, 1917–1919.	(1854–1936)	
20	Gustaf Wrangel		5 Jun 1917	12 Sep 1919	2	Commander, 4th Army Division, 1917–1918.; Commandant General in Stockholm, 1917–1918.	(1858–1923)	
21	Erik Bergström		14 Jul 1919	4 Apr 1922	3	Inspector of the Infantry, 1919–1922.	(1857–1937)	
22	Pehr Hasselrot		1921	1926	5	Inspector of the Infantry, 1922–1926.	(1861–1937)	
23	David Hedengren		1922	1923	1	Inspector of the Militärläroverken, 1919–1923.	(1858–1946)	
24	Constantin Fallenius		1922	1927	5	Commander, 5th Army Division, 1917–1923.; Inspector of the Militärläroverken, 1923–1928.	(1862–1932)	
25	Axel Odelstierna		1922	1923	1	Commander, Swedish Fortification Corps, 1915–1923.	(1858–1935)	
*	Bror Munck		13 Oct 1922	13 Oct 1922	0	–.	(1857–1935)	
26	Fredrik Frölich		26 May 1922	1 Nov 1926	4	Quartermaster-General of the Swedish Army, 1915–1926.	(1861–1933)	
27	Axel Carleson		1923	1926	3	Commander, 3rd Army Division, 1922–1926.	(1861–1951)	
28	Emil Mörcke		30 Nov 1923	13 Jun 1926	3	Commander, 1st Army Division, 1917–1926.	(1861–1951)	
29	Thorsten Rudenschöld		1924	1926	2	Commander, 2nd Army Division, 1922–1926.	(1863–1926) Died in office.	
30	Karl Toll		1925	1927	2	Commander, 4th Army Division, 1918–1927.; Commandant General in Stockholm, 1918–1927.	(1862–1936)	
31	Vilhelm Rappe		1925	1928	3	Commandant of Boden Fortress, 1918–1927.	(1863–1939)	
32	Carl Gustaf Hammarskjöld		23 Apr 1926	23 Apr 1930	4	Chief of the General Staff, 1922–1930.	(1865–1940) Promoted to general, 23 Apr 1930.	
33	Lars Sparre		1926	1929	3	Master-General of the Ordnance, 1919–1929.	(1864–1947)	
*	His Royal Highness, Duke of Scania		1928	1932	4	Colonel in Svea Life Guards and the Scanian Cavalry Regiment.	(1882–1973) Promoted to general, 1932	
*	Joachim Åkerman		1928	1928	0	–.	(1868–1958)	
*	Georg Nyström		1928	1928	0	–.	(1865–1942)	
34	Reinhold von Rosen		1929	1930	1	Inspector of the Cavalry, 1922–1930.	(1865–1946)	
35	Henri de Champs		25 Apr 1930	1930	1	Commander, Swedish Fortification Corps, 1923–1934.	(1869–1948)	
36	Ludvig Hammarskiöld		20 Jan 1933	1934	2	Master-General of the Ordnance, 1929–1934.	(1869–1958)	
*	John Nauckhoff		17 Feb 1933	17 Feb 1933	0	–.	(1867–1953)	
*	Peter Hegardt		9 Jun 1933	9 Jun 1933	0	–.	(1868–1945)	
*	Carl Sjögreen		1933	1933	0	–.	(1868–1958)	
37	Axel Sjögreen		1933	1935	2	Commander, Southern Army Division, 1928–1935.	(1870–1959)	
*	Bo Boustedt		1933	1933	0	–.	(1868–1939)	
38	Gösta Lilliehöök		21 Dec 1934	1936	2	Commander, Eastern Army Division, 1930–1936.; Commandant General in Stockholm, 1930–1936.	(1871–1952)	
39	Axel Hultkrantz		28 Apr 1933	11 Apr 1935	2	Quartermaster-General of the Swedish Army, 1926–1935.	(1870–1955)	
40	Olof Thörnell		1 Jul 1936	1 Jan 1940	4	Chief of the Defence Staff, 1936–1939.	(1877–1977) Promoted to general, 1 Jan 1940.	
41	Oscar Nygren		1 Jul 1936	1 Oct 1937	1	Acting Chief of the Army, 1936–1937.	(1872–1960) Promoted to general, 1 Oct 1937.	
42	Axel Lyström		23 May 1937	1 Oct 1937	0	Commanding General, Northern Army Division, 1933–1937.	(1873–1945)	
43	Per Sylvan		1 Oct 1937	1 Oct 1940	3	Chief of the Army, 1937–1940.	(1875–1945)	
44	Lennart Lilliehöök		23 May 1937	30 Sep 1937 (Note: Lilliehöök retired from active service in 1937. However, he was called up during World War II as Inspector for the Army's Motor Vehicle Service between 1941 and 1945.)	0	Commanding General, Western Army Division, 1932–1937.; Inspector for the Army's Motor Vehicle Service, 1941–1945.	(1872–1950)	
*	Oscar Osterman		1939	1939	0	–.	(1874–1956)	
*	Pontus Reuterswärd		1939	1939	0	–.	(1871–1949)	
45	Ivar Holmquist		1 Oct 1940	31 Mar 1944	3	Chief of the Army, 1940–1944.	(1879–1954)	
46	Erik Testrup		1943	1943	0	–.	(1878–1972)	
47	Helge Jung		1 Jan 1944	1 Apr 1944	0	Commanding General, IV Military District, 1943–1944.; Commandant General in Stockholm, 1943–1944.	(1886–1978) Promoted to general, 1 Apr 1944.	
48	Archibald Douglas		1944	1948	4	Chief of the Army, 1944–1948.	(1883–1960)	
*	Erik af Edholm		1944	1944	0	–.	(1878–1954)	
*	Martin Hanngren		1945	1945	0	–.	(1880–1945)	
49	Helge Söderbom		1946	1946	0	–.	(1881–1975)	
50	Ernst af Klercker		1 Mar 1947	1 Apr 1947	0	I Military District, 1942–1947.	(1881–1955)	
*	Ivar Gewert		1957	1957	0	Quartermaster-General of the Swedish Army, 1946–1957.; Vice chief of the Royal Swedish Army Materiel Administration, 1949–1954.; Vice chief of the Royal Swedish Army Supply Administration, 1954–1957.	(1891–1971)	
51	Carl August Ehrensvärd		1948	1957	9	Chief of the Army, 1948–1957.	(1892–1974) Promoted to general, 1957.	
*	Axel Bredberg		1949	1949	0	–.	(1884–1960)	
*	Folke Högberg		1 Apr 1949	1949	0	–.	(1884–1972)	
*	Hugo Cederschiöld		1950	1950	0	–. (Note: Cederschiöld transferred to reserve in 1950, where he remained as lieutenant general until 31 December 1954. After resigning as Chief of His Majesty's Military Staff in 1963, Cederschiöld was promoted to general in the army on 23 May 1963.)	(1878–1968) Promoted to general, 1963	
52	Nils Swedlund		1 Feb 1951	1 Apr 1951	0	Chief of the Defence Staff, 1947–1951.	(1898–1965) Promoted to general, 1 Apr 1951	
53	Henry Kellgren		20 Sep 1951	30 Sep 1951	0	Chief of the Military Office of the Minister of Defence, 1945–1951.	(1886–1954)	
*	Henry Tottie		1951	1951	0	–.	(1888–1952)	
*	Samuel Åkerhielm		1953	1953	0	–.	(1887–1976)	
*	Sven Colliander		1955	1955	0	–.	(1890–1961)	
54	Thord Bonde		1957	1963	6	Chief of the Army, 1957–1963.	(1900–1969) Promoted to general, 1963	
*	Ivar Backlund		1957	1957	0	–.	(1892–1969)	
*	Gustaf Dyrssen		1957	1957	0	–.	(1891–1981)	
*	Birger Hedqvist		1 Oct 1959	1959	-0	–.	(1894–1964)	
*	Sven Salander		1959	1959	0	–.	(1894–1965)	
*	Carl Årmann		1960	1960	0	–.	(1894–1988)	
*	Harald Hægermark		1960	1960	0	–.	(1894–1965)	
*	Bert Carpelan		1961	1961	0	–.	(1895–1981)	
*	Viking Tamm		1961	1961	0	–.	(1896–1975)	
55	Curt Göransson		1963	1969	6	Chief of the Army, 1963–1969.	(1909–1996) Promoted to general, 1969	
*	Richard Åkerman		1963	1963	0	–.	(1898–1981)	
*	Nils Björk		1963	1963	0	–.	(1898–1989)	
*	Hilding Kring		1 Oct 1964	1 Oct 1964	0	–.	(1913–2001)	
*	Edward Malm		1964	1964	0	–.	(1899–1983)	
56	Carl Eric Almgren		1966	1976	10	Chief of the Defence Staff, 1961–1967.; Commanding General, Eastern Military District, 1967–1969.; Commandant General in Stockholm, 1967–1969.; Chief of the Army, 1969–1976.	(1913–2001) Promoted to general, 1976	
57	Arne Mohlin		1966	1972	6	VI Military District, 1963–1966.; Upper Norrland Military District, 1966–1972	(1909–1992)	
58	Gustav Åkerman		1966	1967	1	Commanding General, IV Military District, 1961–1967.; Commandant General in Stockholm, 1961–1967.	(1901–1988)	
*	Regner Leuhusen		1966	1966	0	–.	(1900–1994)	
59	Stig Synnergren		1 Apr 1967	1 Oct 1970	4	Chief of the Defence Staff, 1967–1970.	(1915–2004) Promoted to general, 1 Oct 1970	
*	Malcolm Murray		1968	1968	0	–.	(1904–1995)	
*	Fale Burman		1968	1968	0	–.	(1903–1973)	
60	Ove Ljung		1969	1974	5	Eastern Military District, 1969–1974.; Commandant General in Stockholm, 1969–1974.	(1918–1997)	
*	Karl Gustaf Brandberg		1971	1971	0	–.	(1905–1997)	
61	Karl Eric Holm		1972	1983	11	Commanding General, Southern Military District, 1972–1980.; Chief of Home Guard, 1981–1983.	(1919–2016)	
*	Tage Olihn		1973	1973	0	–.	(1908–1996)	
*	Stig Löfgren		1973	1973	0	–.	(1912–1998)	
*	Erik Rosengren		1973	1973	0	–.	(1908–1988)	
62	Nils Sköld		1974	1984	10	Commanding General, Eastern Military District, 1974–1976.; Commandant General in Stockholm, 1974–1976.; Chief of the Army, 1976–1984.	(1921–1996)	
*	Sten Wåhlin		1974	1974	0	–.	(1914–1981)	
*	Bengt Liljestrand		1975	1975	0	Force Commander of UNEF II, 1975–1976. (Note: Bengt Liljestrand had an acting rank of lieutenant general as Force Commander of UNEF II from 1975 to 1976 but was major general in the Swedish Army.)	(1919–2000)	
63	Lennart Ljung		1 Oct 1976	1 Oct 1978	2	Chief of the Defence Staff, 1976–1978.	(1915–2004) Promoted to general, 1 Oct 1978	
64	Karl-Gösta Lundmark		1976	1980	4	Commanding General, Upper Norrland Military District, 1976–1980.	(1919–1995)	
65	Erik G. Bengtsson		1980	1990	10	Commanding General, Upper Norrland Military District, 1980–1984.; Chief of the Army, 1984–1990.	(1928–)	
66	Bengt Gustafsson		1984	1 Oct 1986	2	Commanding General, Upper Norrland Military District, 1984–1986.	(1933–2019) Promoted to general, 1 Oct 1986	
67	Carl Björeman		1984	1988	4	Commanding General, Southern Military District, 1984–1988.	(1924–2020)	
68	Lars-Eric Wahlgren		1 Jul 1988	1993	5	Force Commander, UNIFIL, 1988–1993.; Force Commander, UNPROFOR, 1993–1993.	(1929–1999)	
69	Gustaf Welin		1988	1992	4	Commanding General, Southern Military District, 1988–1992.	(1930–2008)	
70	Åke Sagrén		1988	1996	0	Commanding General, Upper Norrland Military District, 1988–1990.; Chief of the Army, 1990–1994.; Chief of Army Command, 1994–1996.	(1935–2022)	
71	Curt Sjöö		1990	1996	6	Commanding General, Upper Norrland Military District, 1990–1992.; Commanding General, Northern Military District, 1993–1996.	(1937–)	
72	Percurt Green		1994	2000	6	Chief of the Joint Operations Command (Operationsledningen), 1994–1998.; Deputy Supreme Commander, 1994–1998.; Commanding General, Middle Military District, 1998–2000.; Commandant General in Stockholm, 1998–2000.	(1939–)	
73	Sven-Åke Jansson		1 Jul 1994	1998	4	Commanding General, Southern Military District, 1994–1998.	(1937–2014)	
74	Folke Rehnström		1996	2002	6	Director, Main Unit, Ministry of Defence, 1996–1998.; Chief of the 2oint Forces Directorate, 1998–2002.	(1942–2020)	
75	Mertil Melin		1 Apr 1996	2000	4	Chief of Army Staff, 1996–1998.; Commanding General, Northern Military District, 1998–2000	(1945–2023)	
76	Johan Hederstedt		1998	1 Jul 2000	2	–.	(1943–) Promoted to general, 1 Jul 2000	
77	Hans Berndtson		1 Jul 1998	2005	7	Chief of the General Training and Management Directorate, 1998–2000.; Chief of the Swedish Armed Forces Headquarters, 2001–2002.; Deputy Supreme Commander, 2001–2005.	(1945–)	
78	Johan Kihl		2000	2004	4	Strategic Plans and Policy Directorate, 2000–2004.; Swedish Armed Forces Special Forces, 2000–2004.; Swedish Armed Forces Headquarters, 2002–2004.	(1946–)	
79	Claes-Göran Fant		1 Sep 2005	2007	2	Expert in the Swedish Defence Commission (Försvarsberedningen), 2005–2007.	(1951–)	
80	Sverker Göranson		2007	25 Mar 2009	2	Chief of Defence Staff, 2007–2009.; Chief of Staff of the Swedish Armed Forces, 2007–2009.	(1954–) Promoted to general, 25 Mar 2009	
81	Anders Lindström		13 Dec 2007	2011	4	Chief of Joint Operations, 2007–2011.; Commandant General in Stockholm, 2007–2011.	(1955–)	
82	Göran Mårtensson		2014	2016	2	Chief of Joint Operations, 2014–2016.	(1960–)	
83	Dennis Gyllensporre		2014	2021	7	Chief of Defence Staff, 2014–2018; Chief of the Swedish Armed Forces Headquarters, 2014–2018.; Chief of the Swedish Armed Forces Special Forces, 2014–2018.; Commandant General in Stockholm, 2014–2018.; Force Commander of MINUSMA, 2018–2021.	(1964–)	
84	Michael Claesson		10 Sep 2020	30 Sep 2024	4	Chief of Joint Operations, 2020–2022.; Commandant General in Stockholm, 2020–2024.; Chief of the Defence Staff, 2023–2024	(1965–) Promoted to general, 1 Oct 2024	
85	Jonny Lindfors		1 Jul 2026		0	Swedish Military Representative to the EU and NATO, 2026–present.	(1975–)	

== See also ==
- Generallöjtnant
- List of Swedish Navy lieutenant generals
- List of Swedish Air Force lieutenant generals
