= Oscar Osterman =

Swedish Army officer

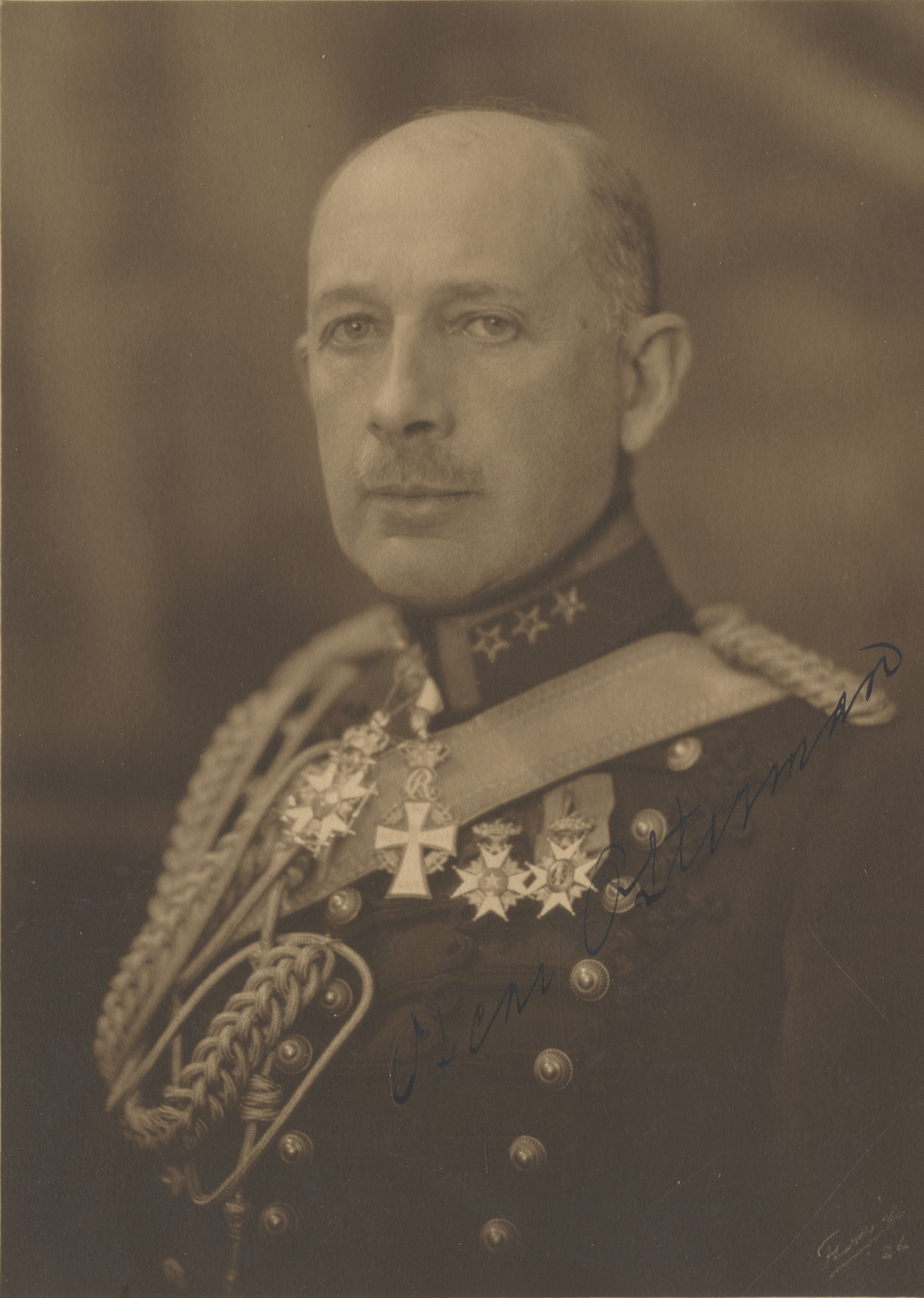
- Osterman as colonel
- Born: Oscar Fredrik Osterman; 5 September 1874; Brunflo, Sweden
- Died: 3 November 1956 (aged 82); Stockholm, Sweden
- Burial place: Norra begravningsplatsen
- Military career
- Allegiance: Sweden
- Branch: Swedish Army
- Service years: 1894–1939
- Rank: Lieutenant General
- Commands: Deputy Chief of Ordnance; Boden Artillery Regiment; Göta Artillery Regiment; Master-General of the Ordnance; Inspector of the Swedish Artillery; Swedish Army Ordnance Corps

Lieutenant General Oscar Fredrik Osterman (5 September 1874 – 3 November 1956) was a senior Swedish Army officer. Osterman, a graduate of the Military Academy Karlberg in 1894, held various high-ranking positions within the Swedish Army. He served notably in artillery roles, becoming head of the Artillery Department's Construction Section from 1908 to 1912 and again from 1914 to 1915. Later, he assumed significant responsibilities as Acting Deputy Chief of Ordnance and subsequently as Deputy Chief of Ordnance until 1926. Promoted through the ranks, he eventually commanded the Boden Artillery Regiment in 1926 and the Göta Artillery Regiment in 1930 before becoming a major general in 1933. His career culminated in appointments such as Master-General of the Ordnance and chief of the Swedish Army Ordnance Corps in 1934, leading to his retirement as a lieutenant general in 1939. Osterman also played a pivotal role in the establishment of the Swedish Association of Army, Navy, and Air Force Officers and served as its first chairman from 1932 to 1936.

== Early life ==
Osterman was born on 5 September 1874 in Brunflo Parish in Östersund Municipality, Jämtland County, Sweden, the son of Major Tell Justus Jacob Christopher Osterman and his wife Hedvig (Hedda) Maria Glas. He passed mogenhetsexamen in Östersund in 1892.

== Career ==
In 1894, Osterman graduated from the Military Academy Karlberg. He attended the same class at Karlberg as Colonel Reinhold Geijer, Colonel Jacques Virgin, Colonel Casimir Lewenhaupt, Colonel Erland Ljungberg, and Major Wiktor Unander. Osterman was commissioned as an officer in 1894 and was assigned as a underlöjtnant to the Jämtland Ranger Regiment in Östersund. He transferred to the Norrland Artillery Regiment in Östersund in 1895, where he was promoted to lieutenant in 1898. He attended the Artillery and Engineering College's advanced course from 1898 to 1900 and served in the Artillery Staff from 1902, being promoted to captain in the Norrland Artillery Regiment in 1904. Osterman, who was an artillery specialist, held key positions within the artillery. As an artillery staff officer, he was the head of the Artillery Department's Construction Section in the Royal Swedish Army Materiel Administration from 1908 to 1912 and from 1914 to 1915. Immediately thereafter, he served as the Acting Deputy Chief of Ordnance and held the position of Deputy Chief of Ordnance from 1915 to 1926. He was promoted to major in 1915, to lieutenant colonel in 1918, and to colonel in 1922.

Osterman was appointed as the commander of the Boden Artillery Regiment in Boden in 1926, of the Göta Artillery Regiment in Gothenburg in 1930, and as brigade commander in the Northern Army Division (Norra arméfördelningen in 1931. He was promoted to major general in the army in 1933. In 1934, he was appointed as the Master-General of the Ordnance, concurrently serving as the Inspector of the Swedish Artillery from 1934 to 1937, and in the same year, he became the chief of the Swedish Army Ordnance Corps. He retired and was given a tombstone promotion to lieutenant general in 1939.

Osterman was a judicious and skilled technician and a prominent organizer, by nature objective, factual, and thoughtful. When the Swedish Association of Army, Navy and Air Force Officers (Svenska officersförbundet) was formed in 1932 with the task of safeguarding the interests of the officer corps, especially in financial matters, Osterman was elected as its first chairman and remained in that position until 1936.

Osterman became a member of the Royal Swedish Academy of War Sciences in 1911 and served as its vice president from 1935 to 1937.

== Personal life ==
On 28 February 1905, Osterman married Eva Clara Margareta Skytte af Sätra (23 June 1882 – July 1976), the daughter of Colonel Carl Göran Skytte af Sätra and Märta Burman. They had been engaged two years before, in December 1903.

They had three children; Märta, Carl-Göran, and Stig Osterman (1905–1950), who worked as an assessor in the Swedish Fiscal Court of Appeal (Kammarrätten).

Osterman became board deputy in Norrland Guild (Norrlands Gille) in April 1915. He was chairman of the Osterman Family Association (Ostermanska släktföreningen) from its inception on 3 December 1949. He declined reelection due to age reasons at the family meeting at Berns salonger in Stockholm in April 1952 and was appointed as the first honorary chairman. He was succeeded by the former vice chairman, chief physician Einar Osterman.

== Death ==
Osterman died on 3 November 1956 in Kungholm Parish in Stockholm. He was buried on 13 November 1956, at the Northern Crematorium in Solna by curate Claes Robach.

== Dates of rank ==
- 1894 – Underlöjtnant
- 1898 – Lieutenant
- 1904 – Captain
- 1915 – Major
- 1918 – Lieutenant colonel
- 1922 – Colonel
- 1933 – Major general
- 1939 – Lieutenant general

== Awards and decorations ==
=== Swedish ===
- (Sweden) Commander Grand Cross of the Order of the Sword (15 November 1940)
- (Sweden) Commander 1st Class of the Order of the Sword (10 December 1928)
- (Sweden) Commander of the Order of the Sword (15 December 1925)
- (Sweden) Knight 1st Class of the Order of the Sword (1915)
- (Sweden) Knight of the Order of the Polar Star (1922)
- (Sweden) Knight 1st Class of the Order of Vasa (1911)

=== Foreign ===
- (Denmark) Commander 1st Class of the Order of the Dannebrog (December 1937)
- (Denmark) Commander of the Order of the Dannebrog (between 1921 and 1925)

== Honours ==
- Member of the Royal Swedish Academy of War Sciences (1911)

Military offices
Preceded by Nore Martin	Deputy Chief of Ordnance; 1916–1926	Succeeded by Hjalmar Thorén
Preceded by Axel Lyström	Boden Artillery Regiment; 1926–1930	Succeeded by Axel Lagerfelt
Preceded by Sixten Schmidt	Göta Artillery Regiment; 1930–1931	Succeeded by Gunnar Salander
Preceded by Ludvig Hammarskiöld	Inspector of the Swedish Artillery; 1934–1937	Succeeded by Sture Gadd
Preceded by Ludvig Hammarskiöld	Master-General of the Ordnance; 1934–1939	Succeeded by Halvar Gustafsson
Preceded by None	Swedish Army Ordnance Corps; 1937–1939	Succeeded by Halvar Gustafsson
Professional and academic associations
Preceded by None	Chairman of the Swedish Association of Army, Navy and Air Force Officers; 1932–1936	Succeeded by Axel Bredberg
