= Edward Malm =

Swedish Army officer (1899–1983)

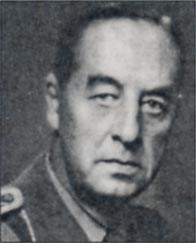
- Born: Edvard Magnus Samuel Malm; 20 August 1899; Bäve, Sweden
- Died: 23 May 1983 (aged 83); Salem, Sweden
- Military career
- Allegiance: Sweden
- Branch: Swedish Army
- Service years: 1921–1964
- Rank: Lieutenant General
- Commands: Stockholm Anti-Aircraft Regiment; Deputy Chief of Ordnance; Master-General of the Ordnance

Lieutenant General Edvard (Edward) Magnus Samuel Malm (20 August 1899 – 23 May 1983) was a senior Swedish Army officer. Malm served as commander of Stockholm Anti-Aircraft Regiment (1949–1956), as Deputy Chief of Ordnance (1956–1959), and as Master-General of the Ordnance (1959–1964).

== Early life ==
Malm was born on 20 August 1899 in Bäve Parish, Gothenburg and Bohus County, Sweden, the son of Lieutenant General Olof Malm who served as minister for war (1907–1911), and his wife the son of Thomasine Ulrika Barnekow. Malm passed studentexamen in 1918.

== Career ==
Malm graduated from Military Academy Karlberg in 1921 and was commissioned as an officer and assigned as a second lieutenant to Svea Artillery Regiment the same year, where he was promoted to lieutenant in 1925. He attended the General Artillery Course at the Artillery and Engineering College from 1922 to 1923 and the Higher Artillery Course there from 1924 to 1926. He served in the Artillery Staff from 1927 to 1928 and in Svea Artillery Regiment from 1928 to 1930 and took a course for weapons officers in 1930 and received air defence training. From 1931 to 1933 Malm studied at the Royal Institute of Technology in Stockholm. He then served in the Royal Swedish Army Materiel Administration between 1933 and 1943: as a control officer at the Control Department (Kontrollavdelningen) in the Military Office (Militärbyrån) in the Artillery Department (Artilleridepartementet) from 1933 to 1936, in the Artillery Gun and Instrumentation Department (Pjäs- och instrumentavdelningen) in the 1st Materiel Office (1. materielbyrån) in the Ordnance Department (Tygdepartementet) from 1936 to 1940, as head of and rapporteur in the Industry Office (Industribyrån) in the Ordnance Department from 1940 to 1941 and as head of the Maintenance Office (Underhållsbyrån) in the Ordnance Department from 1941 to 1943. Malm was promoted to captain in 1935 and transferred to the Swedish Army Ordnance Corps in 1936. He attended an ordnance officer course in 1940 and was promoted to major in 1941. In 1943 he was promoted to lieutenant colonel, after which he served in Östgöta Anti-Aircraft Regiment from 1943 to 1945. He served from 1945 to 1948 in the Anti-Aircraft Department (Luftvärnsavdelningen) in the Army Inspectorate (Arméinspektionen) in the Army Staff, whereupon from 1948 to 1949 Malm was an assistant at the Weapons Office (Vapenbyrån) in the Ordnance Department (Tygavdelningen) of the Royal Swedish Army Materiel Administration.

In 1949 he was promoted to colonel, after which he was commander of Stockholm Anti-Aircraft Regiment from 1949 to 1956 and studied at the Swedish National Defence College in 1955. He then served as Deputy Chief of Ordnance in the Royal Swedish Army Ordnance Administration from 1956 to 1959. He was promoted to major general in 1959, whereupon Malm served as Master-General of the Ordnance and head of the Swedish Army Ordnance Corps from 1959 to 1964. He was vice chief of the Royal Swedish Army Ordnance Administration from 1959 to 1963 and head of the same authority from 1963 to 1964. As vice chief and head of the Royal Swedish Army Ordnance Administration he was a member of the Administration Board of the Swedish Armed Forces from 1959 to 1964. He was a member of the board of the Swedish National Defence Research Institute from 1957 to 1964 and chairman of the Central Joint Consultation Board of the Swedish Armed Forces (Försvarets centrala företagsnämnd) from 1960 to 1964. Malm retired from active service in 1964 and was promoted to lieutenant general on the reserve list.

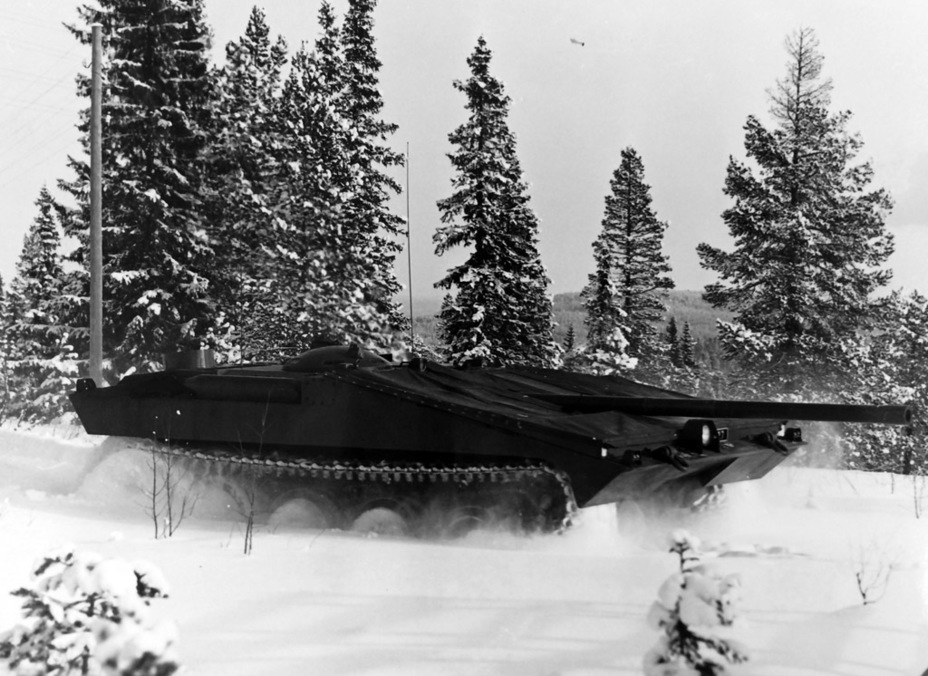
Edward Malm actively participated in the negotiations prior to the acquisition of stridsvagn 103.

“As the newly appointed Master-General of the Ordnance, Edward Malm was faced with procurement tasks that were both technically and financially more extensive than those his predecessors had to solve. This extensive procurement activity had been prompted by the Defence Act of 1958, that the Army's equipment would soon be significantly strengthened with weapon systems, which a potential attacker would not be able to easily destroy with the help of tactical nuclear weapons. Among other things, it was a matter of developing combat vehicles of new kinds, mainly a new tank, an armored, self-propelled, long-range artillery gun and a new, relatively well-armed vehicle for armoured infantry. Malm was well grown for the big tasks. His powerful figure proved to be matched by an ability to work and a courage to make difficult decisions, which went far beyond the ordinary. Purposefully, he expanded his knowledge in the relevant technology areas. As for the previously mentioned new combat vehicles, for which he was given responsibility, he was not satisfied with the knowledge and experience that was available within Sweden. More than any of his predecessors, he took the time to study developments elsewhere and to discuss important problems with foreign expertise on his own. Edward Malm personally took a very active part in the decisive negotiations with the industrial companies concerned prior to the serial acquisition of the new combat vehicles. It has been testified that he was perceived by the companies as a hard negotiator. This was particularly evident in the final negotiations on the series agreement for the new tank, Stridsvagn S (Strv 103), which AB Bofors was to manufacture [...]. It is said to have caused concern and dismay in several places within the company, when Malm in private negotiation with the company management about this the largest single order in both the Royal Swedish Army Ordnance Administration and in AB Bofors' history managed to settle a series price, which was significantly below what was offered. It also gave Malm great satisfaction [...] to experience several years later that this agreement, which was initially perceived as pressured, became very beneficial for the company as well, in that it, in order for it to be profitable, forced a rationalization of the manufacturing process to a degree which was not previously considered possible."

== Personal life ==
In 1924, Malm married Louise Arfwedson (1902–1983), the daughter of Gerhard Arfwedson and Baroness Caroline De Geer.

== Death ==
Malm died on 23 May 1983 in Salem Parish in Stockholm County. He was at the time of his death living in Rönninge. Malm was interred on 22 June 1983 at Djursholm cemetery.

== Dates of rank ==
- 1921 – Second lieutenant
- 1925 – Lieutenant
- 1935 – Captain
- 1941 – Major
- 1943 – Lieutenant colonel
- 1949 – Colonel
- 1959 – Major general
- 1964 – Lieutenant general

== Awards and decorations ==
- (Sweden) Commander 1st Class of the Order of the Sword (6 June 1956)
- (Sweden) Commander of the Order of the Sword (23 November 1953)
- (Sweden) Knight of the Order of the Sword (1941)
- (Sweden) Knight of the Order of Vasa (1946)
- (Sweden) Swedish Women's Voluntary Defence Organization Royal Medal of Merit in silver
- (Sweden) Home Guard Medal of Merit in Gold (6 June 1962)
- (Sweden) Stockholm Air Defence Association's merit plaque in gold (Stockholms luftvärnsförenings förtjänstplakett i guld)

== Honours ==
- Member of the Royal Swedish Academy of War Sciences (1945)

Military offices
Preceded by Hugo Stendahl	Stockholm Anti-Aircraft Regiment; 1949–1956	Succeeded by Sven Hådell
Preceded by Anders Nordström	Deputy Chief of Ordnance; 1956–1959	Succeeded by Fredrik Hård af Segerstad
Preceded by Birger Hedqvist	Master-General of the Ordnance; 1959–1964	Succeeded by Sten Wåhlin
