= Swedish Army Ordnance Corps =

Former administrative corps of the Swedish Army

- Fälttygkåren
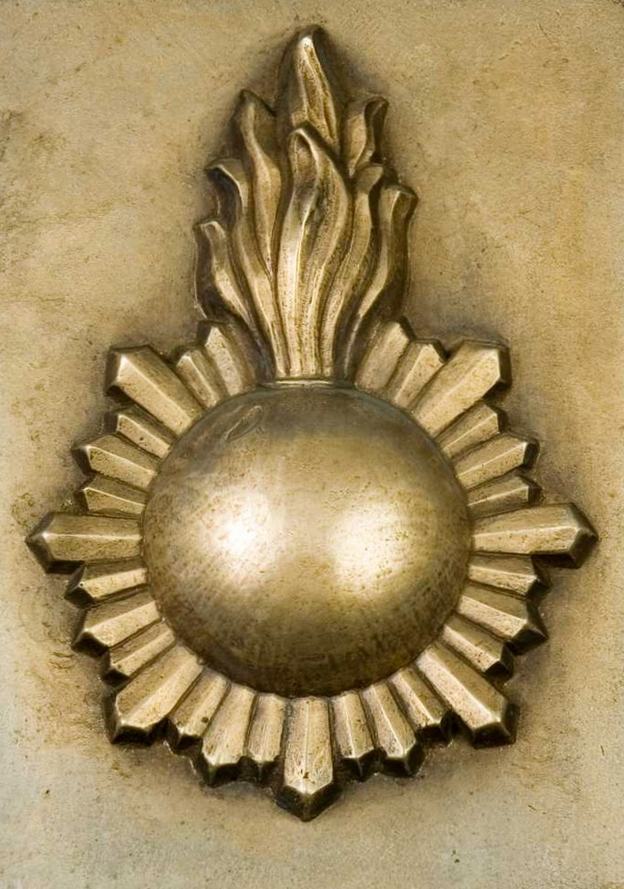
- Insignia of the Swedish Army Ordnance Corps
- Active: 1937–1973
- Country: Sweden
- Allegiance: Swedish Armed Forces
- Branch: Swedish Army
- Type: Administrative corps/Personnel branch
- Role: Ordnance
- Size: c. 100–150 people

Commanders
- Notable commanders: Birger Hedqvist; Edward Malm; Sten Wåhlin; Ove Ljung

The Swedish Army Ordnance Corps (Swedish: Fälttygkåren, Ftk) was an administrative corps of the Swedish Army established in 1937 (its first instruction on 18 June 1937). The majority of the active officers and some civilian personnel served in the Ordnance Department of the Royal Swedish Army Materiel Administration and its workshops.

== History ==
The corps was established on 1 July 1937 through a merger of the artillery factories and the staff of the Ordnance Depot (Tyganstalten) with the Swedish Fortification Corps and the Swedish Army Service Troops' ordnance services as well as with the military units' ordnance officers and ordnance non-commissioned officers. The new administrative corps was named the Swedish Army Ordnance Corps (Fälttygkåren) and with the Master-General of the Ordnance as its head. The Master-General of the Ordnance had been the head of the Artillery Department of the Royal Swedish Army Materiel Administration, whose artillery staff officers and clerks also belonged to the corps. This corps thus consisted of both officers, non-commissioned officers and civilians. The military unit's weapons artisans remained outside the corps.

In 1973, the Swedish Army Ordnance Corps was amalgamated with the Quartermaster Corps of the Swedish Armed Forces into the Commissary Corps of the Swedish Armed Forces.
