= Birger Hedqvist =

Swedish Army officer (1894–1964)

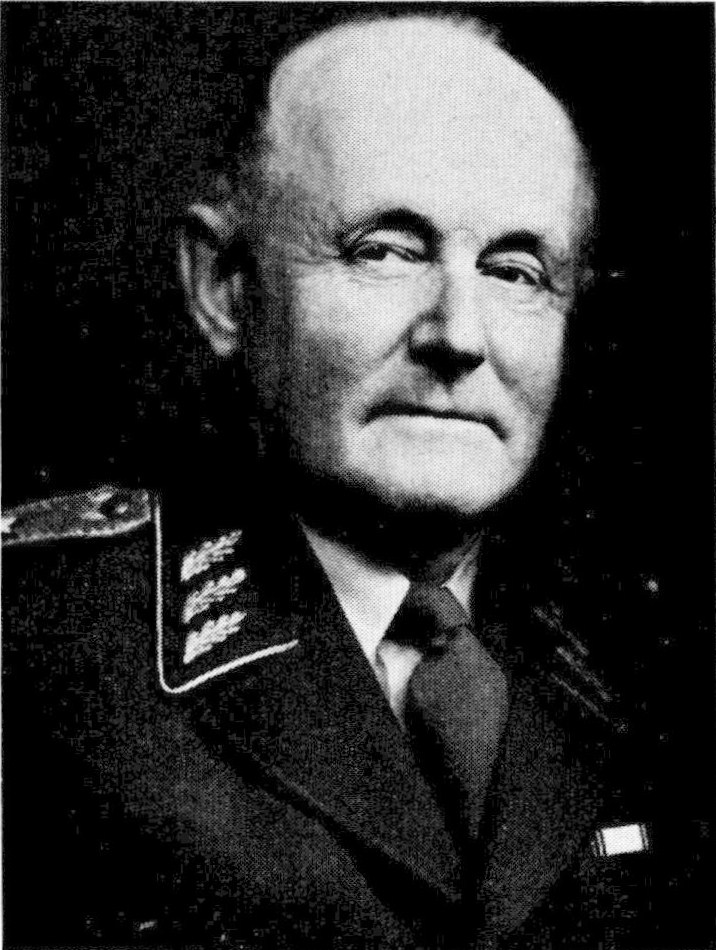
- Born: Karl Birger Hedqvist; 13 May 1894; Piteå, Sweden
- Died: 24 February 1964 (aged 69); Stockholm, Sweden
- Burial place: Norra begravningsplatsen
- Military career
- Allegiance: Sweden
- Branch: Swedish Army
- Service years: 1913–1959
- Rank: Lieutenant General
- Commands: Deputy Chief of Ordnance; Master-General of the Ordnance; Vice Chief, Army Ordnance Administration

Lieutenant General Karl Birger Hedqvist (13 May 1894 – 24 February 1964) was a Swedish Army officer who served as Deputy Chief of Ordnance from 1939 to 1949 and as Master-General of the Ordnance from 1949 to 1959. Hedqvist graduated from the Military Academy Karlberg in 1913 and began his military career in the Norrland Artillery Regiment. He completed advanced artillery training and served as a teacher at the Artillery and Engineering College. Throughout the 1920s and 1930s, he held several positions in the Artillery Staff and the Swedish Army Materiel Administration, focusing on artillery strategy and industry coordination. During World War II, as Deputy Chief of Ordnance, he played a key role in equipping Sweden’s army and leading complex negotiations with the War Material Administration. In 1949, he was promoted to major general and became Master-General of the Ordnance, overseeing major organizational reforms and modernization efforts. From 1954 to 1959, he served as vice chief of the newly formed Army Ordnance Administration. His leadership helped streamline military procurement and ensured Sweden’s army was well-equipped during a critical period. He retired in 1959 with the rank of lieutenant general.

== Early life ==
Hedqvist was born on 13 May 1894 in Piteå landsförsamling, Norrbotten County, Sweden the son of av Emil Hedqvist and his wife Elin Åström. Hedqvist passed studentexamen at Umeå högre allmänna läroverk in 1911.

== Career ==
Hedqvist graduated from the Military Academy Karlberg in 1913 and was commissioned as an officer in Norrland Artillery Regiment the same year with the rank of underlöjtnant, to which regiment he belonged until 1924. He attended the General Artillery Course at the Artillery and Engineering College (AIHS) from 1915 to 1916 and the Higher Artillery Course there from 1916 to 1918. He was promoted to lieutenant in 1917 and worked 1919–1921 as a rehearsal and assistant teacher at AIHS. After a tour of duty, he was assigned as an adjutant in the Artillery Inspectorate (Artilleriinspektionen) in the Army Staff in 1922. In 1924, Hedqvist became an officer in the Artillery Staff with a position in the Industry Department of the Artillery Department in the Royal Swedish Army Materiel Administration, a position he held until 1932. In 1926 he was appointed captain in the Artillery Staff and was transferred in 1928 to Norrland Artillery Regiment. He was a teacher of art of war (strategy) at AIHS from 1926 to 1933. In 1929, Hedqvist became an adjutant to the commander of the Artillery Staff, who also served as head of the Swedish Army Artillery School (Artilleriets skjutskola, ArtSS). From 1932 to 1934, he served in the General Staff and was an expert in the 1930 Defense Commission (1930 års försvarskommission) from 1931 to 1935 and a member of the Army General Assembly (Arméns fullmäktige) from 1934 to 1937. Hedqvist was promoted to major in the army in 1934 and was artillery battery commander at Norrland Artillery Regiment from 1934 to 1936. He was transferred to the Artillery Staff in 1936.

From 1936 to 1954, Hedqvist served in the Royal Swedish Army Materiel Administration: as head of the Industrial Department in the Artillery Department 1936–1937, and as head of the Industry Office (Industribyrån) in the Ordnance Department (Tygdepartementet) 1937–1939. He was promoted to lieutenant colonel in the Swedish Army Ordnance Corps in 1937 and in 1939, Hedqvist was promoted to colonel and appointed Deputy Chief of Ordnance in the Ordnance Department (later Ordnance Department, Tygavdelningen). He served 10 years in this position until 1949 Hedqvist's efforts as Deputy Chief of Ordnance throughout World War II, led to Sweden at the end of the war being relatively well equipped for an attack. With the advent of the Royal Swedish War Material Administration (Krigsmaterielverket) on 1 July 1943, all materiel matters were complicated, and even relatively insignificant orders to the war industry had to be preceded by tenacious and protracted negotiations before Minister of Defence between the army command and representatives of the War Material Administration. These negotiations were led by the army almost without exception by Hedqvist.

In 1949, Hedqvist was promoted to major general and appointed Master-General of the Ordnance. His first five years as Master-General of the Ordnance 1949–54 were characterized by difficult investigations of an organizational nature. During these years, the 1946 military administrative investigation was underway, the work of which did not lead to the abolition of the Royal Swedish War Material Administration until 1954 and the reorganization of the military administrations. During the last five years of Hedqvist's time as Master-General of the Ordnance, the army's ordnance equipment plan was implemented. Through this plan, opportunities were created to plan the army's equipment with modern equipment with foresight. When the Ordnance Department of the Royal Swedish Army Materiel Administration on 1 July 1954 was transformed into the independent authority Royal Swedish Army Ordnance Administration with the Chief of the Army as head of authority, Hedqvist was served as vice chief of the authority in his capacity as Master-General of the Ordnance until 1959, when he transferred to the reserve as lieutenant general. In his capacity as vice chief, Hedqvist was also a member of the Administration Board of the Swedish Armed Forces.

== Personal life ==
On 2 April 1917 in Östersund, Hedqvist married Elin Katarina Mårtensson (5 April 1891 in Östersund – 28 March 1951 in Stockholm), the daughter of Olof Mårtensson and Brita Olofsdotter. On 16 February 1956 in Stockholm, he married Sonja Elisabet Carlson (28 June 1898 in Degerfors – 11 April 1986). the daughter of Per Carlson and Selma Hildegard Loqvist.

Hedqvist was the father of Carl-Åke (born 1918), Barbro (born 1921) and Stig (born 1923).

== Death ==
Hedqvist died on 24 February 1964 in Oscar Parish, Stockholm. He was interred at Norra begravningsplatsen in Solna Municipality on 4 March 1964.

== Dates of rank ==
- 31 December 1913 – Underlöjtnant
- 9 February 1917 – Lieutenant
- 1 November 1926 – Captain
- 14 December 1934 – Major
- 1 July 1937 – Lieutenant colonel
- 1 October 1939 – Colonel
- 1 April 1949 – Major general
- 1 October 1959 – Lieutenant general

== Awards and decorations ==
=== Swedish ===
- (Sweden) Commander Grand Cross of the Order of the Sword (6 June 1956)
- (Sweden) Commander 1st Class of the Order of the Sword (15 November 1945)
- (Sweden) Commander of the Order of the Sword (14 November 1942)
- (Sweden) Knight of the Order of the Sword (1934)
- (Sweden) Knight of the Order of Vasa (1935)
- (Sweden) Knight of the Order of the Polar Star (1941)
- (Sweden) Home Guard Medal of Merit in Gold (6 June 1950)

=== Foreign ===
- (Denmark) Commander 1st Class of the Order of the Dannebrog
- (France) Commander of the Legion of Honour
- (Finland) 2nd Class of the Order of the Cross of Liberty with Swords
- (Norway) King Haakon VII Freedom Medal
- (Denmark) Danish Liberty Medal

== Honours ==
- Member of the Royal Swedish Academy of War Sciences (1937)
- President of the Royal Swedish Academy of War Sciences (1951–1953)

Military offices
Preceded by Halvar Gustafsson	Deputy Chief of Ordnance; 1939–1949	Succeeded by Anders Nordström
Preceded by Halvar Gustafsson	Master-General of the Ordnance; 1949–1959	Succeeded by Edward Malm
Preceded by None	Vice Chief of the Royal Swedish Army Ordnance Administration; 1954–1959	Succeeded by Edward Malm
Professional and academic associations
Preceded by Helge Strömbäck	President of the Royal Swedish Academy of War Sciences; 1951–1953	Succeeded by Stig H:son Ericson
