= Rapid 3D Mapping =

Stereophotogrammetry technology

Rapid 3D Mapping applied on the Royal Castle of Sweden.

Rapid 3D Mapping is a stereophotogrammetry technology developed by the Swedish defence and security company Saab. The system generates three-dimensional maps by image captures of the terrain from a crewed aircraft, helicopter and/or UAV.

Rapid 3D Mapping makes it possible to generate a three-dimensional map within hours of the flight, the results depends on the existing sensors available on the aircraft. The typical coverage for an aeroplane is 100 square kilometers per hour with a resolution of 0.1m at ground level.

In 2010 the system was selected by the Swedish Defence Materiel Administration to generate 3D-models for the Swedish Gripen fighter jet simulators.
