= Ludvig Hammarskiöld =

Swedish Army officer

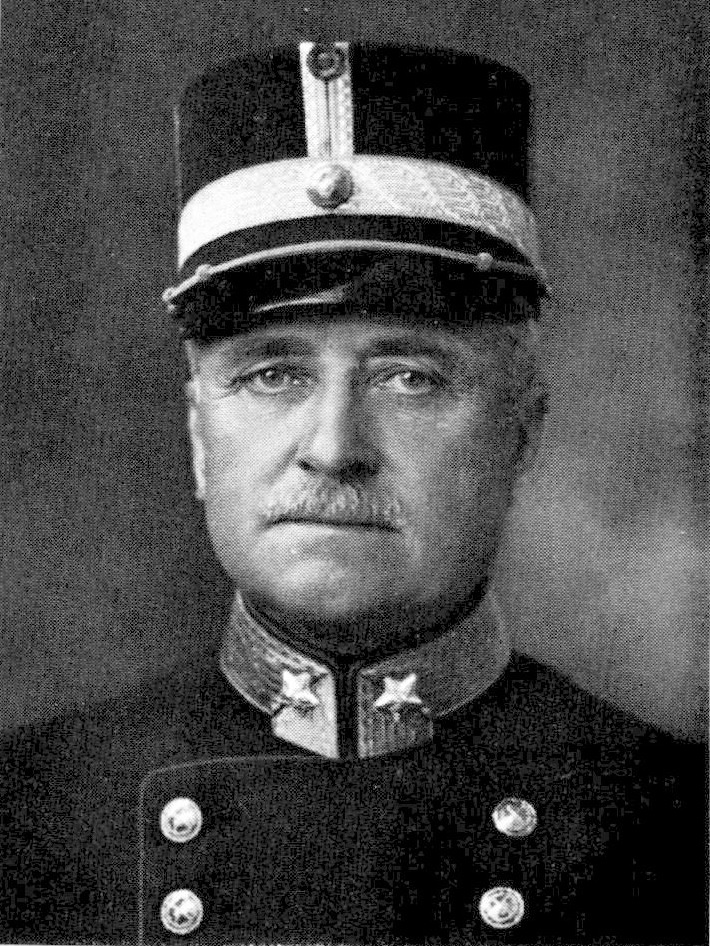
- Born: Peder Adolf Ludvig Regnell Hammarskiöld; 26 June 1869; Dingtuna, Sweden
- Died: 4 July 1958 (aged 89); Stockholm, Sweden
- Burial place: Norra begravningsplatsen
- Military career
- Allegiance: Sweden
- Branch: Swedish Army
- Service years: 1889–1934
- Rank: Lieutenant General
- Commands: Artillery Staff; Småland Artillery Regiment; Swedish Army Artillery School; Svea Artillery Regiment; 2nd Army Division; Eastern Army Division; Commandant General of Stockholm Garrison; Master-General of the Ordnance; Inspector of the Artillery

Lieutenant General Peder Adolf Ludvig Regnell Hammarskiöld (26 June 1869 – 4 July 1958) was a Swedish Army officer. Hammarskiöld's senior commands include commanding officer of the 2nd Army Division and the Eastern Army Division, the position of Commandant General of Stockholm Garrison, Master-General of the Ordnance and Inspector of the Artillery. As a military historian, he researched the ancient history of the Swedish artillery.

== Early life ==
Hammarskiöld was born on 26 June 1869 in Dingtuna Parish, Västmanland County, Sweden, the son of major Per Theodor Hammarskiöld and his wife Sofia Gustafva Regnell. He was grandnephew of Lorenzo Hammarsköld.

== Career ==
Hammarskiöld was commissioned as an officer in First Svea Artillery Regiment in 1889 with the rank of underlöjtnant. Hammarskiöld attended the Artillery and Engineering College from 1893 to 1897 and served as a dispatch officer in staff of the IV Army Division in 1898. He became an artillery staff officer in 1899 and was secretary in artillery commissions from 1900 to 1902 and was promoted to captain in 1903. He participated in the work of the Boden Committee in 1905 and served in the General Staff from 1908 to 1909 and became major in the army and chief of the Artillery Staff in 1909. He then served as major in Svea Artillery Regiment in 1911 and as lieutenant colonel in Boden-Karlsborg Artillery Regiment in 1913. Hammarskiöld served as chairman of the Artillery Committee from 1914 to 1915.

Hammarskiöld was promoted to colonel in 1915 and was appointed regimental commander of Småland Artillery Regiment in Jönköping. He was a member of the committee for the preparation of a stalemate (trench) warfare instruction from 1916 to 1917 and a member of the study commission to the German Army and the Eastern Front from 1916 to 1917. Hammarskiöld was commanding officer of the Swedish Army Artillery School (Artilleriskjutskolan) from 1919 to 1920 and of Svea Artillery Regiment from 1922 to 1926. Hammarskiöld was chairman of the Artillery Committee from 1922 to 1923 and a member of the Army Council (Arméfullmäktige) in 1923 and in 1925. In 1926, Hammarskiöld was promoted to major general and appointed commanding officer of the 2nd Army Division (II. arméfördelningen). Hammarskiöld was commanding officer of the Eastern Army Division (Östra arméfördelningen) and Commandant General of Stockholm Garrison from 1928 to 1929 and was then appointed Master-General of the Ordnance and Inspector of the Artillery in 1929. He was promoted to lieutenant general in 1933 and retired and transferred to the reserve in 1934.

Hammarskiöld had strong military history interests. After entering retirement he devoted himself to thorough research on the Swedish artillery in the past. He dealt with topics such as De äldre Vasakungarnas artilleri ("The Artillery of the Older Vasa Kings") (1942), Artilleriet under Gustaf II Adolfs krig ("The Artillery During Gustav II Adolf's War") (1943) and Artilleriet i slaget vid Jankow den 24 febr 1645 ("Artillery at the Battle of Jankau, 24 Feb 1645") (1945), published in Artilleri-tidskrift. In 1922 he published Studie över artilleriets samverkan med infanteriet ("Study of the Artillery's Cooperation with the Infantry").

== Personal life ==
Hammarskiöld married on 22 July 1896 in Hedvig Eleonora Parish, Stockholm to Gerda Cecilia Neijber (6 August 1874 – 22 Nov 1965), the daughter of Magnus Julius Neijber and Augusta Henriette Moll. He was the father five children: Karin Augusta Sofia Hammarskjöld (1897–1975), a businesswoman, Per Arvid Magnus Hammarskiöld (1899–1988), an engineer, Sven Ludvig Hammarskiöld (1901–1983), a judge and businessman, Göran Hammarskjöld (1906–1969), an officer, and Lennart Hammarskiöld (1912–1974), a banker.

== Death ==
Hammarskiöld died on 4 July 1958 in Engelbrekt Parish, Stockholm. He was buried on 25 August 1958 in a family grave in Norra begravningsplatsen in Solna Municipality.

== Dates of rank ==
- 1889 – Underlöjtnant
- 1895 – Lieutenant
- 1903 – Captain
- 1909 – Major
- 1913 – Lieutenant colonel
- 1915 – Colonel
- 1926 – Major general
- 1933 – Lieutenant general

== Awards and decorations ==
=== Swedish ===
- (Sweden) King Gustaf V's Jubilee Commemorative Medal (1928)
- (Sweden) Commander Grand Cross of the Order of the Sword (16 June 1933)
- (Sweden) Landstormen's Silver Medal (LandstSM)

=== Foreign ===
- (Estonia) 1st Class of the Order of the Cross of the Eagle
- Grand Cross of the Order of the White Rose of Finland
- (Latvia) Grand Cross of the Order of the Three Stars
- (Spain) Grand Cross of the Cross of Military Merit (Note: The source doesn't specify the color of the decoration.)
- (France) Grand Officer of the Legion of Honour
- (Russian Empire) Knight 2nd Class of the Order of Saint Anna

== Honours ==
- Member of the board of Sällskapet Idun ("Idun Society")
- Member of the Royal Society for Publication of Manuscripts on Scandinavian History (1903)
- Member of the Royal Swedish Academy of War Sciences (1907)
- President of the Royal Swedish Academy of War Sciences (1935–1937)

== Bibliography ==
- Hammarskjöld, Ludvig (1944). Artilleriet under Gustaf II Adolfs krig (in Swedish). Uppsala. SELIBR 3352709.
- Slaget vid Jankow 1645 - 24/2 - 1945: minnesskrift. Skrifter / Militärlitteraturföreningens förlag, 99-0578882-4; 192 (in Swedish). Stockholm. 1945. SELIBR 396902.

== Footnotes ==
Military offices
Preceded by Axel Breitholtz	Svea Artillery Regiment; 1922–1926	Succeeded by Axel Lyström
Preceded by Thorsten Rudenschöld	2nd Army Division; 1926–1927	Succeeded by None
Preceded by None	Eastern Army Division; 1928–1929	Succeeded by Bo Boustedt
Preceded by Karl Toll	Commandant General in Stockholm; 1928–1929	Succeeded by Bo Boustedt
Preceded by Lars Sparre	Master-General of the Ordnance; Inspector of the Artillery; 1929–1934	Succeeded by Oscar Osterman
Professional and academic associations
Preceded by Fredrik Riben	President of the Royal Swedish Academy of War Sciences; 1935–1937	Succeeded by Oscar Nygren
