= Deputy Chief of Ordnance =

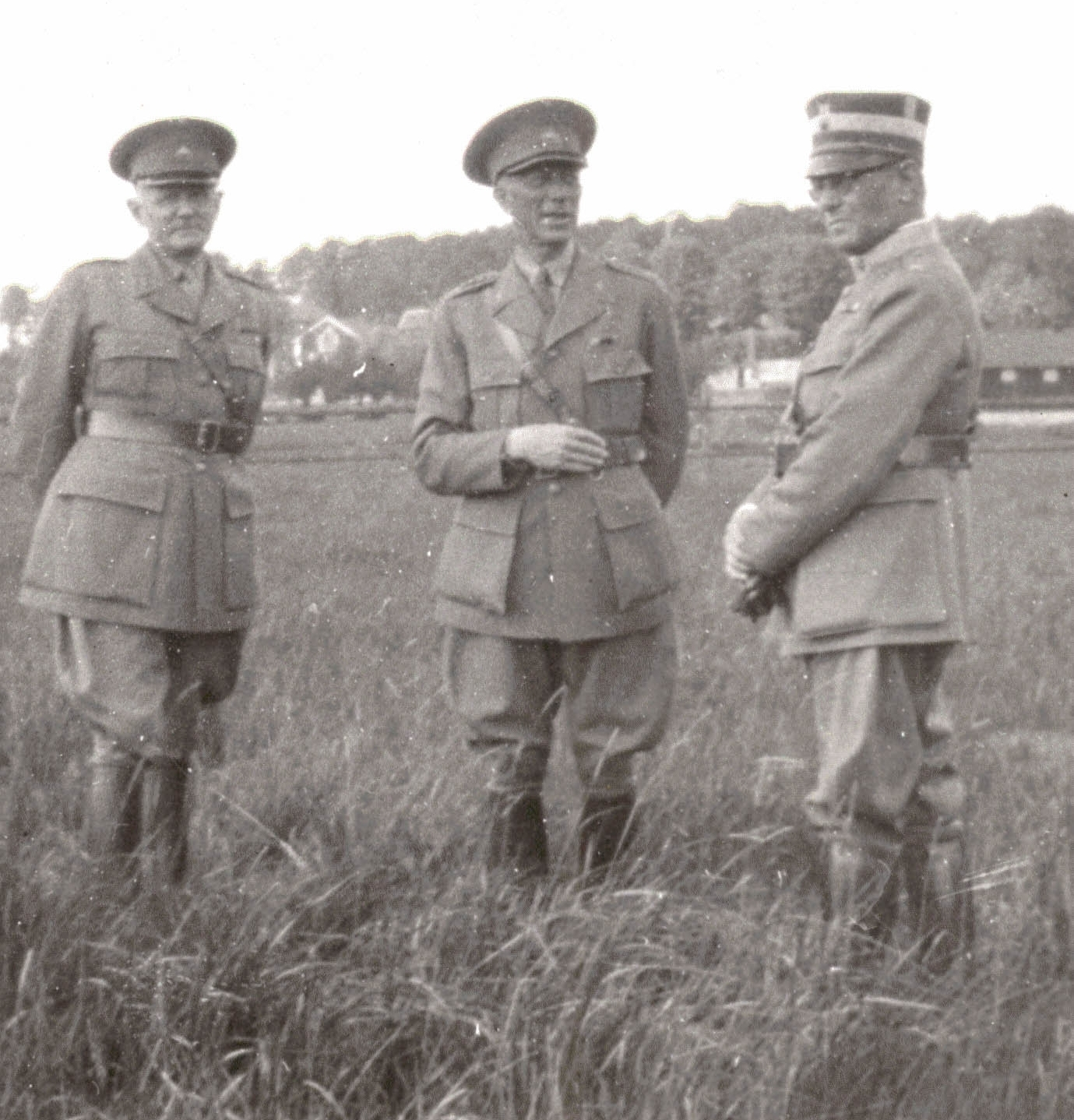
Deputy Chief of Ordnance, Colonel Birger Hedqvist (left) together with the commander of S 1, Colonel Gottfried Hain (middle) and the Master-General of the Ordnance, Major General Halvar Gustafsson (right).

The Deputy Chief of Ordnance (Swedish: Fälttygmästare) was the head of the Swedish Army's ordnance establishments in Sweden. During the 1800s and 1900s, his duties changed several times. The position was abolished in 1968.

== History ==
The Master-General of the Ordnance was chief of the Swedish Artillery. The cases he was to decide were processed in two offices: the Office of the Master-General of the Ordnance (Generalfälttygmästareämbetets expedition) and the Office of the Chief of Artillery (Chefens för artilleriet expedition). In the former office, which was headed by the Deputy Chief of Ordnance, all cases concerning materiel were processed; in the latter, which was headed by the chief of the Artillery Staff, all cases concerning artillery personnel and the scientific training of the artillery branch were processed. The Master-General of the Ordnance was also head of the Royal Swedish Army Materiel Administration's Artillery Department, and all military matters of the Deputy Chief of Ordnance were presented before him in that capacity, as the head of the Military Office (Militärbyrån). The Deputy Chief of Ordnance was also a military member of the said department. The Deputy Chief of Ordnance later became the head of the Royal Swedish Army Materiel Administration's Artillery Department as well as the artillery factories and ordnance establishments. Even later, it was the name of the artillery officer (of the rank of regimental officer), who was the head of the Military Office of the Royal Swedish Army Materiel Administration's Artillery Department, who was responsible to provide arms and ammunition to the army.

Later in the 1900s, the Deputy Chief of Ordnance served in the Royal Swedish Army Ordnance Administration and was from 1 July 1957 deputy to the vice chief and from 1 July 1963 deputy to the chief of the authority. The Royal Swedish Army Ordnance Administration's Central Planning, Intelligence Center and Materiel Inspection were all three subordinate to the Deputy Chief of Ordnance. The Deputy Chief of Ordnance position was abolished in 1968 when the Royal Swedish Army Materiel Administration was disbanded.

== Deputy Chiefs of Ordnance ==
Portrait	Master-General of the Ordnance	Took office	Left office	Time in office	Defence branch	Monarch	Ref.
Carl Gustaf Hjärne	Colonel (Note: Hjärne was major when taking office on 12 April 1884 and was promoted to lieutenant colonel on 2 May 1884 and to colonel on 1 November 1889. He died while still in office on 29 December 1891.); Carl Gustaf Hjärne (1834–1891)	12 April 1884	29 December 1891	7 years, 261 days	Army	Oscar II	
John Bratt	Colonel (Note: Bratt was lieutenant colonel when taking office in 1892 and was promoted to colonel in 1893 while still in office.); John Bratt (1838–1916)	1892	1894	1–2 years	Army	Oscar II	
Otto Virgin	Colonel (Note: Virgin was major when taking office in 1894 and was promoted to lieutenant colonel in 1897 and to colonel in 1898 while still in office.); Otto Virgin (1852–1922)	1894	1899	4–5 years	Army	Oscar II	
Herman Fleming	Major; Herman Fleming (1859–1937)	1899	1902	2–3 years	Army	Oscar II	
Sune Wennerberg	Lieutenant colonel Sune Wennerberg (1855–1908)	1902	1903	0–1 years	Army	Oscar II	
David Hedengren	Lieutenant colonel David Hedengren (1858–1946)	1903	1905	1–2 years	Army	Oscar II	
Nore Martin	Colonel (Note: Martin was major when taking office in 1905 and was promoted to lieutenant colonel in 1908 and to colonel in 1913 while still in office.); Nore Martin (1859–1922)	1905	1915	9–10 years	Army	Oscar II; Gustaf V	
Oscar Osterman	Colonel (Note: Osterman was major when taking office in 1916 and was promoted to lieutenant colonel in 1918 and to colonel in 1922 while still in office.); Oscar Osterman (1874–1956)	1916	1926	9–10 years	Army	Gustaf V	
Hjalmar Thorén	Lieutenant colonel (Note: Thorén was major when taking office in 1926 and was promoted to lieutenant colonel in 1928 while still in office.); Hjalmar Thorén (1878–1941)	1926	1931	4–5 years	Army	Gustaf V	-
Halvar Gustafsson	Colonel (Note: Gustafsson was major when taking office on 7 July 1931 and was promoted to lieutenant colonel on 8 December 1933 and to colonel on 7 October 1936 while still in office.); Halvar Gustafsson (1887–1953)	7 July 1931	1939	7–8 years	Army	Gustaf V	
Birger Hedqvist	Colonel; Birger Hedqvist (1894–1964)	1 October 1939	30 March 1949	9 years, 180 days	Army	Gustaf V	
Anders Nordström	Major general (Note: Nordström was colonel when taking office in 1949 and was promoted to major general in 1953 while still in office.); Anders Nordström (1895–1966)	1949	1956	6–7 years	Army	Gustaf V Gustaf VI Adolf	-
Edward Malm	Major general Edward Malm (1899–1983)	1956	1959	2–3 years	Army	Gustaf VI Adolf	-
Fredrik Hård af Segerstad	Senior colonel Fredrik Hård af Segerstad (1903–1984)	1959	1964	4–5 years	Army	Gustaf VI Adolf	-
Erik Envall	Major general (Note: Envall was senior colonel when taking office in 1964 and was promoted to major general in 1966 while still in office.); Erik Envall (1912–1984)	1964	1968	3–4 years	Army	Gustaf VI Adolf	-

== See also ==
- Master-General of the Ordnance
