= List of Swedish Air Force lieutenant generals =

This is a list of lieutenant generals in the Swedish Air Force since its formation in 1926. The grade of lieutenant general (or three-star general (Note: Until 1972, a Swedish lieutenant general was a two-star rank.)) is ordinarily the second-highest in the peacetime air force, ranking above major general and below general.

== List of Swedish Air Force lieutenant generals ==
Entries are indexed by the numerical order in which each officer was appointed to that rank while on active duty, or by an asterisk (*) if the officer did not serve in that rank while on active duty. Each entry lists the officer's name, date of rank, date the officer vacated the active-duty rank, number of years on active duty as lieutenant general (Yrs), (Note: The number of years on active duty as lieutenant general is taken to be the number of days rounded to the nearest whole year and excluding any gaps in appointment.) positions held as lieutenant general, and other biographical notes. (Note: Biographical notes include years of birth and death; dates of promotion to higher permanent grade; and other unusual career events such as death in office or resignation.)

	Name	Photo	Date of rank	Date vacated	Yrs	Position	Notes	Ref
1	Torsten Friis		1936	30 Jun 1942	6	Chief of the Air Force, 1934–1942.	(1882–1967)	
2	Bengt Nordenskiöld		1 Jul 1942	30 Apr 1954	12	Chief of the Air Force, 1942–1954.	(1891–1983) Promoted to general, 30 Apr 1954	
3	Axel Ljungdahl		1 Jul 1954	30 Jun 1960	6	Chief of the Air Force, 1954–1960.	(1897–1995) Promoted to general, 1960	
4	Torsten Rapp		1 Jul 1960	1 Oct 1961	1	Chief of the Air Force, 1960–1961.	(1905–1993) Promoted to general, 1 Oct 1961	
*	Gustaf Adolf Westring		1961	1961	0	–.	(1900–1963)	
5	Lage Thunberg		1 Oct 1961	30 Sep 1968	7	Chief of the Air Force, 1961–1968.	(1905–1977) Promoted to general, 1968	
*	Björn Bjuggren		1964	1964	0	–.	(1904–1968)	
6	Stig Norén		1966	30 Sep 1973	7	Commanding General, Southern Military District, 1966–1968.; Chief of the Air Force, 1968–1973.	(1908–1996) Promoted to general, 1973	
7	Nils Personne		1972	1980	8	Commanding General, Upper Norrland Military District, 1972–1976.; Commanding General, Western Military District, 1976–1980.	(1918–2013)	
*	Gösta Odqvist		1973	1973	0	–.	(1913–2005)	
8	Dick Stenberg		1 Oct 1973	30 Sep 1982	9	Chief of the Air Force, 1973–1982.	(1921–2004)	
9	Sven-Olof Olson		1980	30 Sep 1988	8	Commanding General, Southern Military District, 1980–1982; Chief of the Air Force, 1982–1988.	(1926–2021)	
10	Bengt Lehander		1 Oct 1982	1988	6	Commanding General, Eastern Military District, 1982–1988; Commandant General in Stockholm, 1982–1988.	(1925–1994)	
11	Lars-Erik Englund		1986	30 Sep 1994	8	Commanding General, Upper Norrland Military District, 1986–1988; Chief of the Air Force, 1988–1994.; Chief of Air Force Staff, 1994–1994.	(1934–2010)	
12	Owe Wiktorin		1 Jul 1991	1 Jul 1994	3	Chief of the Defence Staff, 1991–1992.; Commanding General, Southern Military District, 1992–1994.	(1940–) Promoted to general, 1 Jul 1994	
13	Kent Harrskog		1 Oct 1994	2000	6	Chief of Air Force Staff, 1994–1998.; Commanding General, Southern Military District, 1998–2000.	(1944–)	
14	Kjell Nilsson		1998	2000	2	Chief of the Joint Operations Command (Operationsledningen, OpL), 1998–2000.	(1943–2018)	
15	Jan Jonsson		1 Jul 2000	31 Oct 2007	7	Chief of the Joint Forces Command, 2000–2004; Commandant General in Stockholm, 2005–2007; Chief of Joint Operations, 2007–2007	(1952–2021)	
16	Mats Nilsson		2000	31 Oct 2007	7	Chief of the Joint Forces Directorate, 2002–2005; Chief of Training & Development; Chief of Defence Staff, 2007–2007; Unit for Military Defense, Ministry of Defence, 2007–2012	(1956–)	
17	Jan Salestrand		2007	2014	7	Chief of Armed Forces Training & Procurement, 2007–2009; Chief of Defence Staff, 2009–2014; Chief of the Swedish Armed Forces Headquarters, 2009–2014; Chief of the Swedish Armed Forces Special Forces, 2009–2014; Commandant General in Stockholm, 2012–2014	(1954–)	
18	Anders Silwer		1 Jan 2012	2017	5	Chief of Joint Operations, 2012–2013; Chief of Armed Forces Training & Procurement, 2013–2017	(1959–)	
*	Micael Bydén		– (Note: Bydén was appointed Supreme Commander of the Swedish Armed Forces on 11 September 2015 when he was major general and took office on 1 October 2015 as general.)	1 Oct 2015	–	None	(1964–) Promoted to general, 1 Oct 2015	
19	Johan Svensson		1 Mar 2017	31 Dec 2022	6	Chief of Armed Forces Training & Procurement, 2017–2022	(1962–)	
20	Carl-Johan Edström		1 Jan 2023		3	Chief of Joint Operations, 2023–2024; Chief of the Defence Staff, 2024–present	(1967–)	
21	Thomas Nilsson		1 May 2023		3	Director of Military Intelligence and Security, 2023–present	(1963–)	

== See also ==
- Generallöjtnant
- List of Swedish Navy lieutenant generals
- List of Swedish Army lieutenant generals after 1900
