= Master-General of the Ordnance (Sweden) =

The Master-General of the Ordnance (Swedish: Generalfälttygmästare, Gftm) was the title of a senior military official who was an artillery general and at times head of the Royal Swedish Army Materiel Administration's Artillery Department and artillery inspector. The Master-General of the Ordnance held a pivotal role from the 17th to the late 19th century, overseeing artillery administration, procurement, and maintenance. Originally known as the Riksfälttygsmästare, this position evolved to manage the Artillery Office and later the Ordnance Department of the Royal Swedish Army Materiel Administration. Until 1898, the Master-General also supervised the Swedish Artillery, but organizational changes then placed artillery units under division chiefs, while the Master-General retained authority over key artillery functions. Responsibilities included inspecting artillery exercises and overseeing weapon development, production, and equipment maintenance. The role was eventually split into separate appointments in 1937, with the Master-General heading the Swedish Army Ordnance Corps until its dissolution in 1968.

== History ==
In Sweden, the Master-General of the Ordnance was a service designation for a member of the War College from 1675 and the head of the Artillery Office (Artillerikontoret) from 1682 to 1794 and 1807 to 1897. The Master-General of the Ordnance was responsible for the central administration of the artillery, procurement and maintenance of the army's weapons and ammunition, as well as the reserve materials of the national defence, the so-called Ordnance Storage (Tygförrådet). Previously, he was called the Riksfälttygsmästare. Between 1782 and 1865, the Master-General of the Ordnance was the head of the Ordnance Department of the Royal Swedish Army Materiel Administration, with, among others, the Deputy Chief of Ordnance and two Master of the Ordnance (Tygmästare) of regimental officer's or captain's rank as subordinates.

The Master-General of the Ordnance was until 1898 also the head of the Swedish Artillery, but in said year a change was implemented, through which the artillery regiments and corps were placed under the command of their respective army division chiefs, while the Master-General of the Ordnance retained authority over the Artillery Staff, workshops, and ordnance personnel. However, he still had the obligation to inspect the artillery exercises, and his full title was therefore the Master-General of the Ordnance and Inspector of the Artillery. He was also the head of the Artillery Department of the Royal Swedish Army Materiel Administration. As Inspector, he was responsible for the artillery in the same way as the Inspectors of the Infantry and the Cavalry, and also commanded and supervised the Swedish Army Artillery School (Artilleriets skjutskola, ArtSS).

As Master-General of the Ordnance, it was imperative for him to pay constant attention to the improvement of firearms with associated ammunition and equipment, and for that purpose at the King's request to employ or attempt to arrange for them. Furthermore, he would submit to the King for review and establishing proposals for new or changed weapon designs and more. Finally, he would oversee operations at artillery factories and ordnance establishments and oversee manufacturing of weapons, ammunition and artillery equipment for the needs of the army. To his assistant, the Master-General of the Ordnance and the Inspector of Artillery in the latter capacity had at his disposal certain personnel from the Artillery Staff. This personnel, which together formed the Artillery Inspectorate (Artilleriinspektionen), was made up partly of the head of the Artillery Staff, who also served as commander of the Swedish Army Artillery School, and partly of the chief of staff of the Artillery Inspectorate, a major of the Artillery Staff, with the subordinate Equipment Department and the Inspector's Office Department. The personnel in the departments consisted of Artillery Staff officers and commissioned officers.

The previous appointment as Master-General of the Ordnance and Inspector of Artillery was divided into two appointments on 1 July 1937: one for Master-General of the Ordnance and one for Inspector of Artillery. The Master-General of the Ordnance became the head of the Swedish Army Ordnance Corps. In 1968 the post was eliminated.

== Masters-General of the Ordnance ==
- 1682–1692: Per Larsson Sparre
- 1692–1693: Erik Dahlbergh
- 1693–1710: Johan Siöblad
- 1710–1712: Vacant
- 1712–1715: Reinhold Johan von Fersen
- 1715–1719: Henning Rudolf Horn af Rantzien
- 1719–1724: Hugo Hamilton Hamilton af Hageby
- 1724–1728: Vacant
- 1728–1740: Fredrik Magnus Cronberg
- 1741–1754: Per Siöblad
- 1754–1757: Vacant
- 1757–1759: Thomas Cunninghame (Note: After Per Siöblad's death in 1754 the office was vacant. By subservient letter of 21 October 1756, it was decided that one of the lieutenant colonel in the Artillery would be given the rank of colonel and, until further notice, conduct the tasks of the Master-General of the Ordnance. The government's choice fell on Cunninghame. Cunninghame held the post from 24 January 1757 to 10 December 1758, after which he continued as deputy until his death in 1759.)
- 1759–1761: Carl Ehrensvärd (acting)
- 1761–1765: Carl Funck (acting)
- 1766–1772: Anders Reinhold Wrangel
- 1772–1781: Reinhold Anrep
- 1781–1784: Gabriel von Spången (acting)
- 1784–1791: Carl Gideon Sinclair
- 1791–1800: Carl Ulrik Silfverschiöld
- 1800–1803: Nils Fredrik Ehrenström
- 1803–1807: Vacant
- 1807–1815: Carl von Helvig
- 1816–1821: Carl von Cardell
- 1821–1844: Crown Prince Oscar
- 1828–1834: Claes Josef Breitholtz
- 1844–1849: Axel Gustaf von Arbin
- 1849–1857: Crown Prince Charles
- 1857–1867: Fabian Jakob Wrede af Elimä

Portrait	Master-General of the Ordnance	Took office	Left office	Time in office	Defence branch	Monarch	Ref.
Carl Henrik Hägerflycht	Major general Carl Henrik Hägerflycht (1817–1881); Acting	1867	?	-	Army	Charles XV	
Carl Henrik Hägerflycht	Major general Carl Henrik Hägerflycht (1817–1881)	1872	14 August 1874	1–2 years	Army	Oscar II	
Carl Leijonhufvud	Colonel; Carl Leijonhufvud (1822–1900); Acting	18 February 1873	July 1874	0–1 years	Army	Oscar II	
Frans Reinhold Carlsohn	Colonel; Frans Reinhold Carlsohn (1821–1899); Acting	July 1874	August 1874	0 years	Army	Oscar II	
Carl Leijonhufvud	Lieutenant general (Note: Leijonhufvud was major general when taking office on 14 August 1874 and was promoted to lieutenant general on 14 January 1887.); Carl Leijonhufvud (1822–1900)	14 August 1874	12 September 1890	16 years, 29 days	Army	Oscar II	
Edvard Julius Breitholtz	Major general Edvard Julius Breitholtz (1830–1912)	12 September 1890	31 December 1897	7 years, 110 days	Army	Oscar II	
John Hamilton	Major general John Hamilton (1834–1904)	1898	1902	3–4 years	Army	Oscar II	-
Gottschalk Geijer	Major general Gottschalk Geijer (1850–1924)	12 August 1902	30 October 1903	1 year, 79 days	Army	Oscar II	
Fredrik Leth	Lieutenant general (Note: Took office as major general on 30 October 1903 and was promoted to lieutenant general on 30 September 1910.); Fredrik Leth (1850–1919)	30 October 1903	10 April 1915	11 years, 162 days	Army	Oscar II; Gustaf V	
David Hedengren	Major general David Hedengren (1858–1946)	1915	1919	3–4 years	Army	Gustaf V	
Lars Sparre	Lieutenant general (Note: Took office as major general in 1919 and was promoted to lieutenant general in 1926.); Lars Sparre (1864–1947)	1919	1929	9–10 years	Army	Gustaf V	
Ludvig Hammarskiöld	Lieutenant general (Note: Took office as major general on 1 July 1929 and was promoted to lieutenant general on 20 January 1933.); Ludvig Hammarskiöld (1869–1958)	1 July 1929	1934	4–5 years	Army	Gustaf V	
Oscar Osterman	Major general Oscar Osterman (1874–1956)	1934	1939	4–5 years	Army	Gustaf V	
Halvar Gustafsson	Major general Halvar Gustafsson (1887–1953)	1 October 1939	1949	9–10 years	Army	Gustaf V	
Birger Hedqvist	Major general Birger Hedqvist (1894–1964)	1 April 1949	1959	9–10 years	Army	Gustaf V Gustaf VI Adolf	
Edward Malm	Major general Edward Malm (1899–1983)	1959	1964	4–5 years	Army	Gustaf VI Adolf	
Sten Wåhlin	Major general Sten Wåhlin (1914–1981)	1964	1966	1–2 years	Army	Gustaf VI Adolf	
Ove Ljung	Major general Ove Ljung (1918–1997)	1966	1968	1–2 years	Army	Gustaf VI Adolf	

== See also ==
- Deputy Chief of Ordnance
