= Per Sylvan =

Swedish Army officer

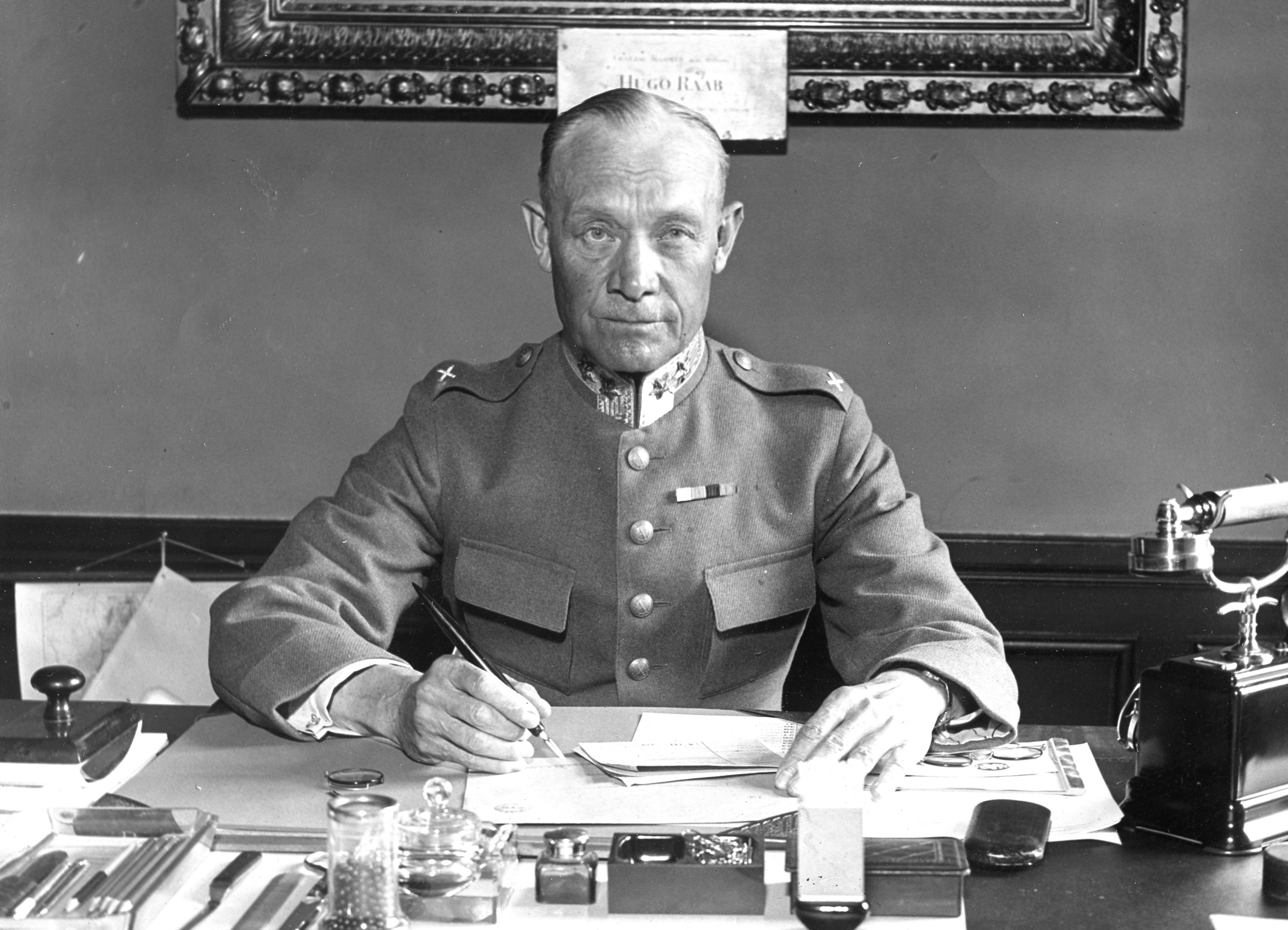
- Born: Per Gustaf Sylvan; 23 April 1875; Malmö, Sweden
- Died: 19 September 1945 (aged 70)
- Military career
- Allegiance: Sweden
- Branch: Swedish Army
- Service years: 1895–1940
- Rank: Lieutenant General
- Commands: Artillery Staff; Småland Army Artillery Regiment; Eastern Army Division; Southern Army Division; Chief of the Army

Lieutenant General Per Gustaf Sylvan (23 April 1875 –19 September 1945) was a senior Swedish Army officer. He served as the first Chief of the Army from 1937 to 1940.

== Early life ==
Sylvan was born on 23 April 1875 in Malmö, Sweden, the son of Ph.D. Per Gustaf Sylvan (1827–1903) and Tina Löfvengren (1844–1893). He was the brother of Major General Ove Sylvan, Colonel Georg Sylvan, and politician Hakon Sylvan.

== Career ==
Sylvan was commissioned as an officer in 1895 with then rank of underlöjtnant. He attended the Artillery and Engineering College higher course and became a lieutenant in 1898 and did refresher training at the same college from 1900 to 1902. Sylvan was an artillery staff officer from 1902 to 1904 and was an artillery teacher at the Artillery and Engineering College from 1904 to 1912. Sylvan was the leader of the Artillery Committee in 1910 and 1918 to 1920 and the Fortification Committee in 1919. He was promoted to captain in 1907 and major in 1915 and was head of the Artillery and Engineering College from 1915 to 1922.

Sylvan was promoted to lieutenant colonel in 1918 and conducted a study trip to the Austrian front the same year. He was a teacher at the Artillery Shooting School from 1920 to 1925 and was lieutenant colonel at the Wendes Artillery Regiment (A 3) in 1922. Sylvan was head of the artillery measuring course in 1922 and 1923 and was a teacher at the Artillery Shooting School from 1920 to 1925. He was promoted to colonel in 1926 and was chief of the Artillery Staff from 1926 to 1931 and was the head of the Artillery Shooting School from 1927 to 1931. Sylvan underwent tactical course for generals in France in 1927.

He was commanding officer of the Småland Army Artillery Regiment (A 6) from 1931 to 1932. Sylvan was brigade commander of the Eastern Army Division from 1932 to 1935, inspector of the Military Schools from 1932 to 1935 and commanding officer of the Southern Army Division from 1935 to 1937. He was promoted to major general in 1933 and to lieutenant general in 1937. Sylvan served as the first Chief of the Army from 1937 until his retirement in 1940.

== Personal life ==
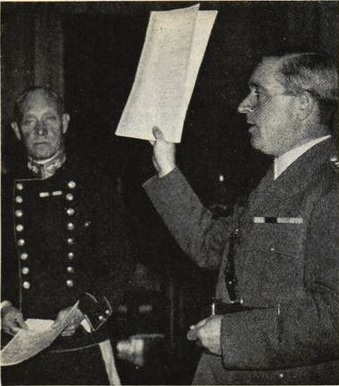
Sylvan (left) and Major General Helge Jung in 1938.

He married the first time in 1906 with Signild Sylvan (1875–1908). They were the parents of Ph.D. Nils Sylvan (1907–1998). He married a second time in 1913 with Märta Santesson (1884–1963).

== Dates of rank ==
- 1895 – Underlöjtnant
- 1898 – Lieutenant
- 1907 – Captain
- 1915 – Major
- 1918 – Lieutenant colonel
- 1926 – Colonel
- 1933 – Major general
- 1937 – Lieutenant general

== Awards and decorations ==
=== Swedish ===
- (Sweden) King Gustaf V's Jubilee Commemorative Medal (1928)
- (Sweden) Commander Grand Cross of the Order of the Sword (15 November 1941)
- (Sweden) Commander 2nd Class of the Order of Vasa (17 November 1931)
- (Sweden) Knight of the Order of the Polar Star (1923)

=== Foreign ===
- (Norway) Grand Cross of the Order of St. Olav
- (Denmark) Commander 2nd Class of the Order of the Dannebrog
- (Netherlands) Commander of the Order of Orange-Nassau with swords

== Honours ==
- Member of the Royal Swedish Academy of War Sciences

== Bibliography ==
- Sylvan, Per (1934). Teknisk-taktisk studie till infanteriets tunga vapen [Technical-tactical study of the infantry's heavy weapons]. Kungl. Krigsvetenskapsakademiens handlingar och tidskrift, 0023-5369; 1934:2 (in Swedish). Stockholm: Norstedt.
- Kuylenstierna, Oswald; Sylvan, Per, eds. (1918). Minnesskrift med anledning av k. högre artilleriläroverkets och krigshögskolans å Marieberg samt artilleri- och ingenjörshögskolans etthundraåriga tillvaro: 1818-1918 [Commemorative publication on the occasion of the Royal Higher Artillery School and War College of Marieberg as well as the Artillery and Engineering College hundred years existence: 1818-1918] (in Swedish). Stockholm.

Military offices
Preceded by Axel A:son Sjögreen	Southern Army Division; 1935–1936	Succeeded by None
Preceded by None	Chief of the Army; 1937–1940	Succeeded by Ivar Holmquist
