= Karl Toll =

Swedish Army officer

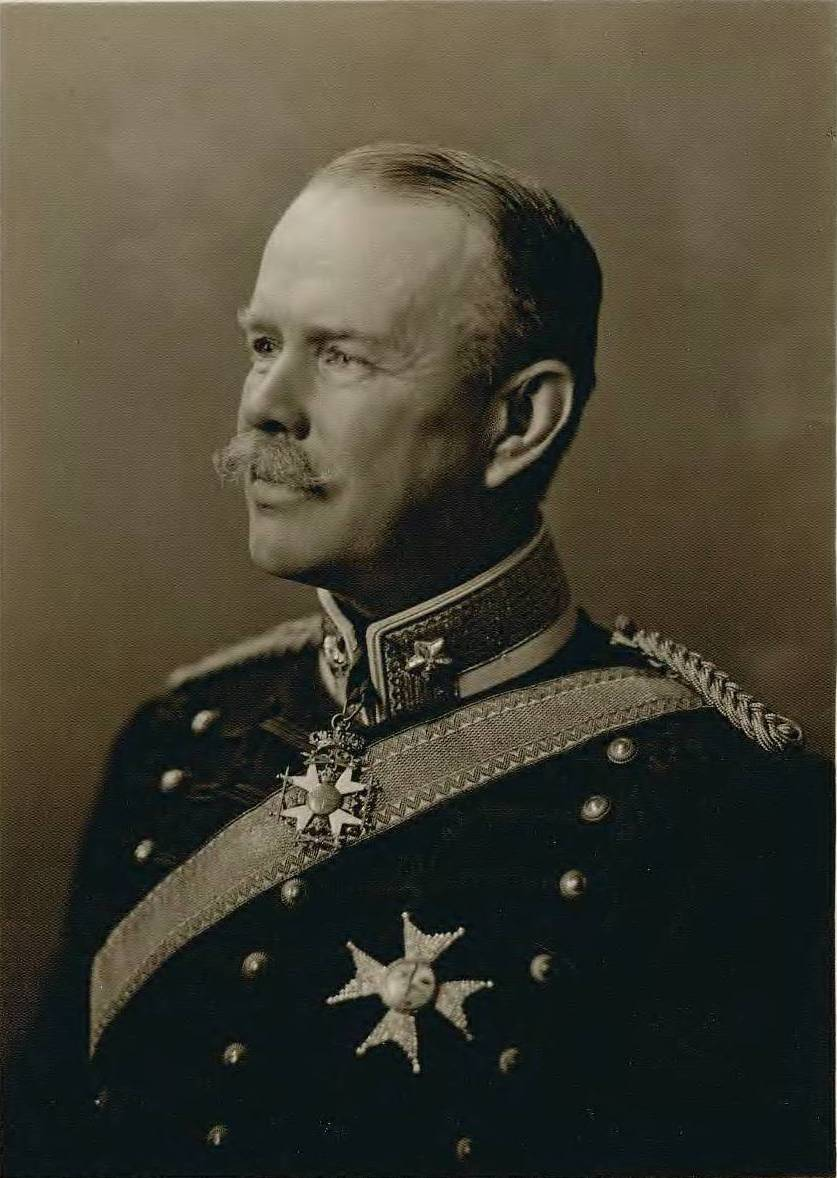
- Toll as major general (1918–1925).
- Born: Karl Osvald Toll; 2 November 1862; Hacksta, Sweden
- Died: 13 October 1936 (aged 73); Stockholm, Sweden
- Burial place: Norra begravningsplatsen
- Military career
- Allegiance: Sweden
- Branch: Swedish Army
- Service years: 1881–1927
- Rank: Lieutenant General
- Commands: Artillery Staff; Gotland Artillery Corps; Wendes Artillery Regiment; 4th Army Division; Commandant General in Stockholm

Lieutenant General Karl Osvald Toll (2 November 1862 – 13 October 1936) was a Swedish Army officer. Toll's senior commands include commanding officer of the 4th Army Division and the position of Commandant General in Stockholm. Toll laid down a sacrificial work on the development of the landstorm organization.

== Early life ==
Toll was born on 2 November 1862 in Hacksta, Uppsala County, Sweden, the son of major general Gustaf Toll and his wife Hedvig von Post. Toll became a volunteer in Närke Regiment on 12 November 1878 and passed mogenhetsexamen in Uppsala on 25 May 1880. Toll attended the Military Academy Karlberg from 14 July the same year and graduated on 25 October 1881.

== Career ==
=== Military career ===
He was commissioned as an officer in Närke Regiment on 18 November 1881 with the rank of underlöjtnant. He was then transferred to Göta Artillery Regiment on 30 December 1881. Toll served as an artillery staff officer from 1894 to 1897 and was promoted to captain in the army in 1895 and in the regiment the year after. He transferred to Second Göta Artillery Regiment in 1897 and served as 2nd teacher at the Military Academy Karlberg from 1896 to 1899 and as 1st teacher from 1899 to 1903.

He was promoted to major in Uppland Artillery Regiment in 1906 and in Småland Artillery Regiment in 1907. Toll was chief of the Artillery Staff from 1904 to 1909 and commanding officer of Gotland Artillery Corps from 1909 to 1911. In 1911, Toll was promoted to colonel and appointed commanding officer of Wendes Artillery Regiment. He would stay in this position for 7 years. In 1918, Toll was promoted to major general and appointed acting commanding officer of the 4th Army Division (IV. arméfördelningen) in 1918 and served as Commandant General in Stockholm from 1918 to 1927. In 1919, Toll was appointed commanding officer of the 4th Army Division. He was promoted to lieutenant general in 1925 and retired from the military in 1927.

=== Other work ===
Toll was chairman of Kristianstadsortens landstormsförening from 1912 to 1918, of Kristianstads läns skytteförbund ("Kristianstad County Schooting Association") from 1914 to 1919, i Föreningen för befrämjande av skolungdomens vapenövningar ("Association for the Promotion of Weapon Exercises for Students") from 1920 to 1931 and in the Landstormens garantiförening. Furthermore, Toll was a member of the Directorate of the Royal Central Gymnastics Institute from 1920 to 1930 and chairman of the board of the Central Association of the Swedish Landstorm Associations (Sveriges landstormsföreningars centralförbund) from 1920 to 1933 and of the Central Board of the National Swedish Rifle Clubs (Skytteförbundens överstyrelse) from 1924 to 1934. He became chairman of the board of the AB Kreditbanken in 1921 and of the board of Kreditkassan's Issuing Company (Emissionsbolag) from 1921 to 1926 and Toll became chairman and a member of the Directorate of the Swedish Nobility Foundation in 1930.

== Personal life ==
On 16 September 1891 at Casimirsborg he married Baroness Anna Louise Elisabet Fleetwood (28 December 1867 – 10 June 1940), the daughter of Lieutenant, Baron Sten Axel Viktor Fleetwood and his first wife, Baroness Lovisa Sofia Carolina Fleetwood. They had five children: Louise (born 1892), Gustaf (born 1894), Axel (born 1897), Elsa (born 1900) and Carl (born 1902).

== Death ==
Toll died on 13 October 1936 in Kungsholm Parish, Stockholm. He was buried on 6 December 1936 in a family grave in Norra begravningsplatsen in Solna Municipality.

== Dates of rank ==
- 1881 – Underlöjtnant
- 1890 – Lieutenant
- 1895 – Captain
- 1906 – Major
- 1909 – Lieutenant colonel
- 1911 – Colonel
- 1918 – Major general
- 1925 – Lieutenant general

== Awards and decorations ==
=== Swedish ===
- (Sweden) Commander 1st Class of the Order of the Sword (6 June 1918)
- (Sweden) Illis Quorum, 12th size in gold (1929)

=== Foreign ===
- (Bulgaria) Grand Cross of the Order of Military Merit (1928)
- (Netherlands) Grand Officer of the Order of Orange-Nassau with Swords (22 September 1924)
- Commander 1st Class of the Order of the White Rose of Finland (1919)
- (Norway) Commander 1st Class of the Order of St. Olav (1919)
- (Denmark) Commander 2nd Class of the Order of the Dannebrog (1913)
- (Kingdom of Saxony) Commander of the Albert Order (1913)

== Honours ==
- Member of the Royal Swedish Academy of War Sciences, 2nd Class (1904), 1st Class (1918)

Military offices
Preceded by Gabriel Axel Torén	Gotland Artillery Corps; 1909–1911	Succeeded by Axel Breitholtz
Preceded by T J Dyrssen	Wendes Artillery Regiment; 1911–1918	Succeeded by G A Lundeberg as Acting
Preceded by J.G.F Wrangel	4th Army Division; 1918–1927	Succeeded by None
Preceded by J.G.F. Wrangel	Commandant General in Stockholm; 1918–1927	Succeeded by Ludvig Hammarskiöld
Professional and academic associations
Preceded by Otto Printzsköld	Chairman of the Directorate of the Swedish Nobility Foundation; 1931–1935	Succeeded by Henning Wachtmeister
