= List of Swedish Navy lieutenant generals =

This is a list of lieutenant generals in the Swedish Navy, i.e. the Swedish Coastal Artillery (1902–2000) and in the Swedish Amphibious Corps (2000–present). The grade of lieutenant general (or three-star general (Note: Until 1972, a Swedish lieutenant general was a two-star rank.)) is ordinarily the second-highest in the peacetime Coastal Artillery/Amphibious Corps, ranking above major general and below general.

== List of lieutenant generals ==
Entries are indexed by the numerical order in which each officer was appointed to that rank while on active duty, or by an asterisk (*) if the officer did not serve in that rank while on active duty. Each entry lists the officer's name, date of rank, date the officer vacated the active-duty rank, number of years on active duty as lieutenant general (Yrs), (Note: The number of years on active duty as lieutenant general is taken to be the number of days rounded to the nearest whole year and excluding any gaps in appointment.) positions held as lieutenant general, and other biographical notes. (Note: Biographical notes include years of birth and death; dates of promotion to higher permanent grade; and other unusual career events such as death in office or resignation.)

=== List of Swedish Coastal Artillery lieutenant generals (1902–2000) ===
	Name	Photo	Date of rank	Date vacated	Yrs	Position	Notes	Ref
1	Herman Wrangel		1916	1924	8	Chief of the Swedish Coastal Artillery (1909–1924).	(1859–1938)	
2	Tor Wahlman		1936	1941	5	Chief of the Swedish Coastal Artillery (1929–1941).	(1878–1954)	
*	Hjalmar Åström		1953	1953	0	–.	(1888–1957)	
*	Rudolf Kolmodin		1961	1961	0	–.	(1896–1978)	
3	Bo Westin		1969	1978	9	Chief of the Naval Staff, 1968–1970.; Chief of the Defence Staff, 1970–1972.; Swedish National Defence College, 1972–1978.	(1913–2009)	
*	Henrik Lange		1972	1972	0	–.	(1908–2000)	
4	Gunnar Eklund		1 Oct 1972	1982	9	Chief of the Defence Staff, 1972–1976.; Commanding General, Eastern Military District, 1976–1982.; Commandant General in Stockholm, 1976–1982.	(1920–2010)	
5	Torsten Engberg		1 Apr 1987	1994	7	Chief of the Defence Staff, 1987–1991.; Commanding General, Middle Military District, 1991–1994.; Commandant General in Stockholm, 1991–1994.	(1934–2018)	
6	Lars G. Persson		1996	1998	2	Commanding General, Northern Military District, 1996–1998.	(1937–)	

=== List of Swedish Amphibious Corps lieutenant generals (2000–present) ===
	Name	Photo	Date of rank	Date vacated	Yrs	Position	Notes	Ref
1	Håkan Syrén		2000	2004	4	Director of Military Intelligence and Security, 1999–2003.	(1952–) Promoted to general, 1 Jan 2004	
2	Bengt-Arne Johansson		2000	2003	3	Chief of the General Training and Management Directorate, 2000–2003.	(1943–)	
3	Göran Gunnarsson		2003	2005	2	Chief of the General Training and Management Directorate, 2003–2005.	(1950–)	

== See also ==
- Generallöjtnant
- List of Swedish Air Force lieutenant generals
- List of Swedish Army lieutenant generals after 1900
