= Sten Wåhlin =

Swedish Army officer

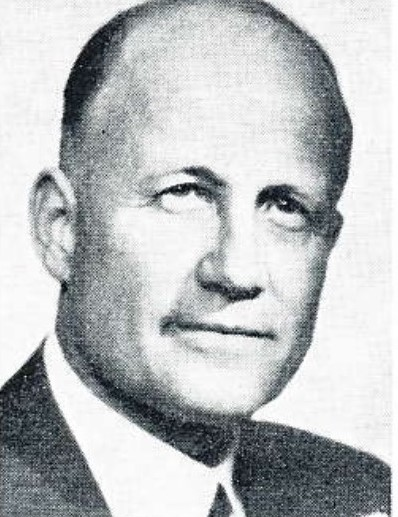
- Born: 19 February 1914; Söderhamn, Sweden
- Died: 15 March 1981 (aged 67); Botkyrka, Sweden
- Relatives: Carl Bergenstråhle (brother-in-law)
- Military career
- Allegiance: Sweden
- Branch: Swedish Army
- Service years: 1935–1974
- Rank: Lieutenant General
- Commands: Swedish Army School of Field Works; Life Regiment Grenadiers; Master-General of the Ordnance; Royal Swedish Army Materiel Administration; Administration Board of the Swedish Armed Forces
- Other work: Head of Defence Materiel Administration

Lieutenant General Sten Wåhlin (19 February 1914 – 15 March 1981) was a Swedish Army officer. Wåhlin served as Master-General of the Ordnance and head of the Royal Swedish Army Materiel Administration, and as chairman of the Administration Board of the Swedish Armed Forces. He was the first Director General of the Defence Materiel Administration, serving from 1968 to 1974.

== Early life ==
Wåhlin was born on 19 February 1914 in Söderhamn, Sweden, the son of Per Wåhlin (1885–1958), a banker, and his wife Tora, née Melin (1884–1950). He passed studentexamen in Stockholm in 1932 and was commissioned as an officer in Swedish Fortification Corps in 1935 with the rank of second lieutenant.

== Career ==
Wåhlin attended the General Fortification Course at the Artillery and Engineering College from 1936 to 1938 and was promoted to lieutenant in 1938 and the Royal Swedish Army Staff College from 1940 to 1942. Wåhlin became captain in the General Staff Corps in 1944 and he served in the Defence Staff from 1944 to 1946. From 1946 to 1951, Wåhlin served as a teacher at the Royal Swedish Army Staff College. He served in Boden Engineer Corps (Ing 3) in 1951. He was then promoted to major in the Swedish Engineer Troops and appointed head of the Army Staff's Equipment Department in 1953. Wåhlin attended the General Course at the Swedish National Defence College in 1954. In 1959, Wåhlin was promoted to lieutenant colonel and appointed commanding officer of the Swedish Army School of Field Works (Arméns fältarbetsskola, FältarbS) in 1959 and two years later he was promoted to colonel and appointed head of Section I of the Army Staff. Wåhlin was a board member of the Swedish Armed Forces Factory Board (Försvarets fabriksstyrelse) from 1962. During 1963 he served as commanding officer of the Life Regiment Grenadiers (I 3).

In 1964, Wåhlin was promoted to major general, after which he served as Master-General of the Ordnance and head of the Royal Swedish Army Materiel Administration from 1 October 1964 to 30 June 1968. However, he was on leave from the Army Materiel Administration from 1 October 1966 and was instead chairman of the Administration Board of the Swedish Armed Forces from 1966 to 1968 (of which he, as serving head of the Royal Swedish Army Materiel Administration, had already been a member from 1964 to 1966). During those years, he was also commissioned to investigate a unified organization for the Swedish Armed Forces materiel procurement, which led to the establishment of the Defence Materiel Administration on 1 July 1968. He was then its Director General and head from 1968 to 1974, after which he transferred to the reserve as lieutenant general in 1974. As Director General, he laid down “extensive work on developing and systematizing the often very complicated materiel procurement process of Swedish Armed Forces, and of particular importance is that he introduced and developed regular routines in contact with branch commanders as well as with institutions directly involved in defense research or in research and experimental activities that are important to the defense, and not least with the defense industry”. From 1978, Wåhlin chaired the parliamentary commission that investigated issues concerning the future of the aerospace and missile industries.

== Personal life ==
In 1940 he married Märtha Bergenstråhle (1913–2011), the daughter of Colonel Georg Bergenstråhle and Elsa (née von Malmborg). They had two children: Lars Petter (born 1944) and Karl Fredrik (born 1952).

The Wåhlin family owned Hallunda Gård, an 18th-century manor house in Hallunda, Botkyrka Municipality.

== Death ==
Wåhlin died on 15 March 1981 in Botkyrka Parish in Stockholm County. He was interred on 24 April 1981 at Botkyrka Cemetery in the same grave as his parents and wife.

== Dates of rank ==
- 1935 – Second lieutenant
- 1938 – Lieutenant
- 1944 – Captain
- 1953 – Major
- 1959 – Lieutenant colonel
- 1961 – Colonel
- 1964 – Major general
- 1974 – Lieutenant general

== Awards and decorations ==
=== Swedish ===
- (Sweden) Commander 1st Class of the Order of the Sword (6 June 1967)
- (Sweden) Home Guard Medal of Merit in gold

=== Foreign ===
- (Norway) Grand Cross of the Order of St. Olav (1 July 1975)

== Honours ==
- Member of the Royal Swedish Academy of War Sciences (1958)
- Honorary member of the Royal Swedish Society of Naval Sciences (1971)

Military offices
Preceded by Per Wollrath Sebastian H:son Tamm	Life Regiment Grenadiers; 1963–1963	Succeeded by Ove Ljung
Preceded by Edward Malm	Master-General of the Ordnance; Royal Swedish Army Materiel Administration; 1964–1968	Succeeded by Ove Ljung as Acting from 1966
Preceded by Christian von Sydow	Administration Board of the Swedish Armed Forces; 1966–1968	Succeeded by None
Government offices
Preceded by None	Defence Materiel Administration; 1968–1974	Succeeded by Ove Ljung
