= Michael Moore (Swedish officer) =

Swedish Air Force officer

Major General Michael Moore (born 1953) is a Swedish Air Force officer, with an air combat control background, who has been a senior military adviser at the Swedish Ministry of Defence.

== Career ==
Moore was born in London, United Kingdom. He attended aspirant and cadet school from 1973 to 1976 and then held combat control and education positions in the Swedish Air Force from 1976 to 1988. He passed the Higher Course at the Swedish Armed Forces Staff College from 1988 to 1990 and then served in the Defence Staff from 1990 to 1992. Between 1992 and 1995, Moore was a teacher and course manager at the Swedish Armed Forces Staff College and between 1996 and 2000 he served first as deputy and then head of the Strategy Department at the Swedish Armed Forces Headquarters in Stockholm. He served as military advisor to the Minister for Defence from 2000 to 2004 before he was responsible for long-term planning and development issues from 2004 to 2007. From spring 2007 to 2010, Moore served as the Swedish Armed Forces's Development Manager. Moore was appointed head of the Enheten för militär förmåga och insatser (MFI) at the Ministry of Defence on 1 September 2010.

Moore became a member of the Royal Swedish Academy of War Sciences in 2007.

== Dates of rank ==
- 19?? – Colonel
- 2000 – Brigadier general
- 2???– Major general
