= Swedish Defence Materiel Administration =

Swedish administrative authority for the supply of materiel

Defence Materiel Administration
- Försvarets materielverk (FMV)

Agency overview
- Formed: 1 July 1968
- Jurisdiction: Government of Sweden
- Headquarters: Banérgatan 62, Stockholm
- Employees: 3,154 (2014)
- Agency executive: Mikael Granholm, Director General
- Parent department: Ministry of Defence
- Website: www.fmv.se/english/

The Swedish Defence Materiel Administration (Swedish: Försvarets materielverk, FMV) is a Swedish government agency that reports to the Ministry of Defence. The agency is responsible for the supply of materiel to the Swedish defence organisation. It is located in Stockholm.

== Directors General since 1968 ==
- 1968–1975: Sten Wåhlin
- 1974–1982: Ove Ljung
- 1982–1988: Carl-Olof Ternryd
- 1988–1995: Per Borg
- 1995–2005: Birgitta Böhlin
- 2005–2012: Gunnar Holmgren
- 2012–2015: Lena Erixon
- 2015–2016: Dan Ohlsson (acting)
- 2016–2025: Göran Mårtensson
- 2025–present: Mikael Granholm

== See also ==
- Government agencies in Sweden
