= Dingtuna =

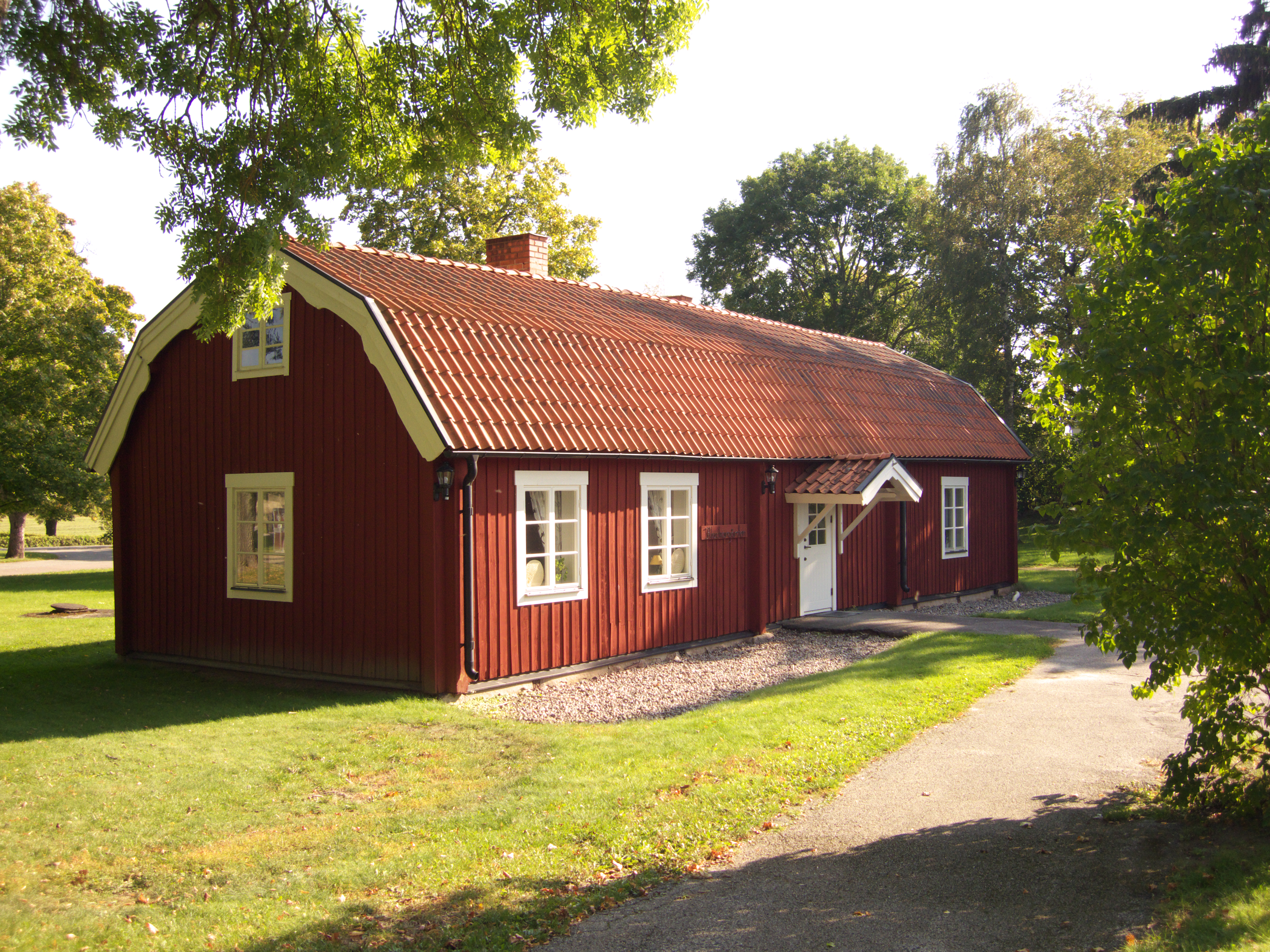
- "Klockargården", old house by Dingtuna church

- Location within Västmanland Location within Sweden
- Coordinates: 59°34′N 16°22′E
- Country: Sweden
- Province: Västmanland
- County: Västmanland County
- Municipality: Västerås Municipality

Area
  - Total: 0.94 km^{2} (0.36 sq mi)

Population (31 December 2010)
  - Total: 1,005
  - Density: 1,065/km^{2} (2,760/sq mi)
- Time zone: UTC+1 (CET)
  - Summer (DST): UTC+2 (CEST)

Dingtuna is a locality within Västerås Municipality, Västmanland County, Sweden with 1,005 inhabitants in 2010.
