= Artillery Staff =

Swedish commanding officer position

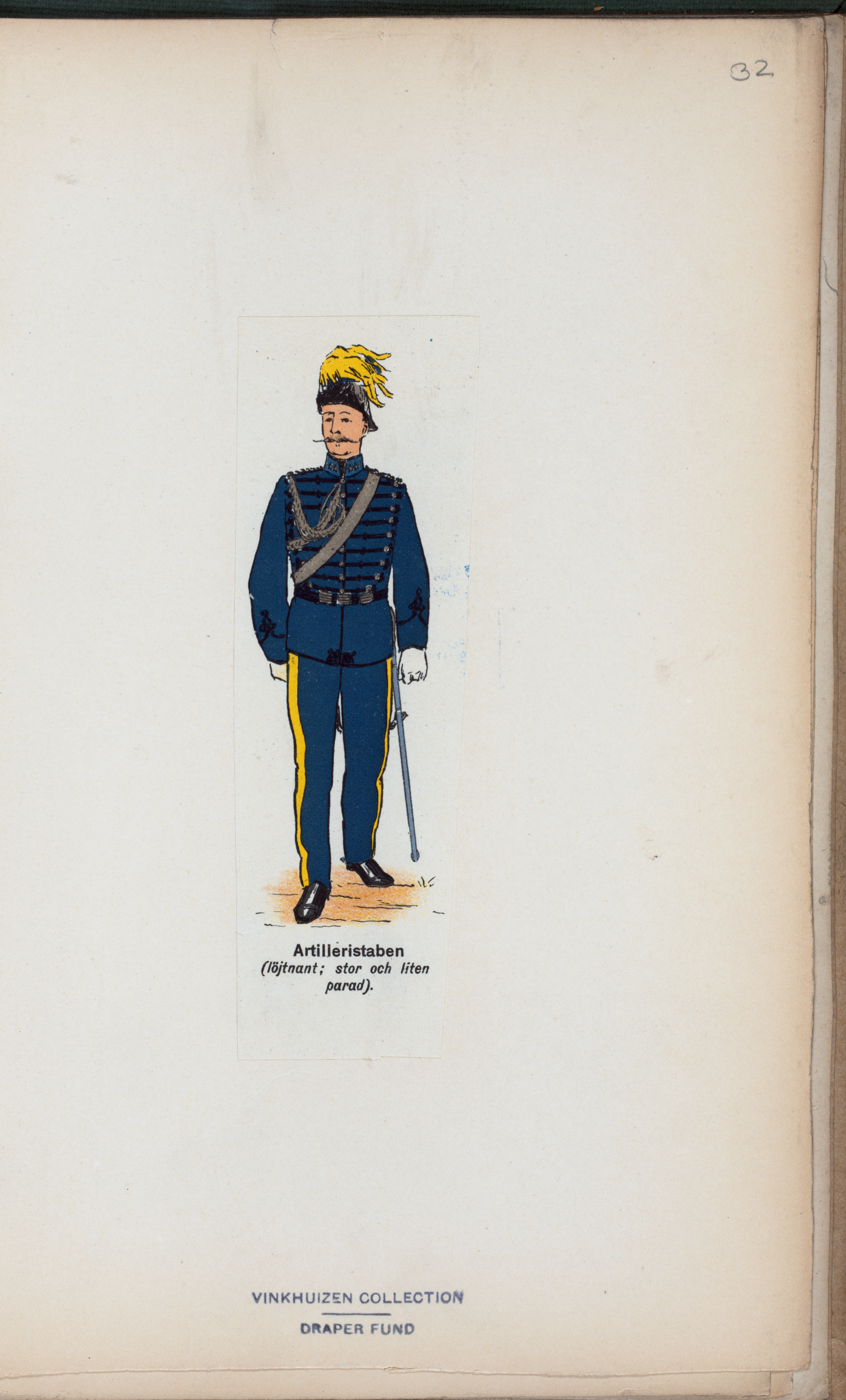
A lieutenant of the Artillery Staff.

Artillery Staff (Swedish: Artilleristaben) in the Swedish Army consisted of commanding officers from the artillery units and had the task of assisting the Master-General of the Ordnance and the Inspector of Artillery in all his activities related questions. It was active between 1807 and 1937.

== History ==
The Artillery Staff was established in 1807 at the suggestion of General Helvig (Royal letter on 4 May 1807), succeeding the Artillery Committee of 1802. The duties of the Artillery Staff was to follow the artillery progress of science in Sweden and abroad, arrange tests and more. The head was the Inspector of Artillery. The Artillery Staff was at first mainly an administrative corps but in 1868 received the character of a government agency when a design office for drawing up the plans and regulations regarding the equipment was transferred to the staff. The office was transferred in 1890 to the Deputy Chief of Ordnance and in 1908 to the Artillery Department of the Royal Swedish Army Materiel Administration.

In 1874, a Statistical Department was added that would follow the artillery developments in Sweden and abroad, and in 1881 an Equipment Department was added which drew up lists of equipment. Finally in 1926, a Shooting School Department was added. According to the Defence Act of 1925, the Artillery Staff consisted of one colonel (chief of staff), two majors and 12 company officer from the artillery as well as one officer, commanded from the infantry, one expedition officer (retired officer), one non-commissioned expedition officer (retired non-commissioned officer) and one expedition guard. The Artillery Staff ceased in 1937. Its duties were taken over by the Artillery Inspectorate (Artilleriinspektionen) and the Artillery Staff Corps (Artilleristabskåren).

== Uniforms 1807–1905 ==
The Artillery Staff wore the artillery uniform m/1815, m/1845, and m/1872. As rank insignia a gold aiguillette m/18?? was worn on the right shoulder and a blue and yellow plume in the bicorne. The staff wore the same button as the General Staff Corps.

== Commanding officers ==
- 1813–1815: Johan Didrik af Wingård
- ????–????: ?
- 1821–1825: Axel Gustaf von Arbin
- 1825–1829: Gustaf Adolf Fleming af Liebelitz
- ????–????: ?
- 1833–1835: Carl Silfverschiöld
- ????–????: ?
- 1837–1847: Anton Gabriel Gyldenstolpe (acting)
- 1848–1854: Fabian Jacob Wrede
- 1854–1857: Gillis Bildt
- 1857–????: Carl Henrik Hägerflycht
- 1858–1861: Gustaf Lagercrantz
- ????–????: ?
- 1867–1870: Knut Erik Leijonhufvud
- ????–????: ?
- 1872–1883: Hjalmar Palmstierna
- 1883–1886: Henrik Albrecht von Stockenström
- ????–????: ?
- 1890–1895: Gottschalk Geijer
- 1895–1898: Anders Jacob (Jacques) Roland de Laval
- 1898–1902: Sune Gunnarsson Wennerberg
- 1902–1903: Gottschalk Geijer
- 1904–1909: Karl Toll
- 1909–1911: Ludvig Hammarskiöld
- 1912–1915: Gerdt August Lundeberg
- 1916–1921: Nils Edvard Ekelöf
- 1921–1925: Gunnar Salander
- 1925–1926: Sven Hjalmar Thorén
- 1925–1926: Johan Gustaf Henning Schmiterlöw (acting)
- 1926–1931: Per Sylvan
- 1932–1933: Johan Gustaf Henning Schmiterlöw (acting)
- 1933–1937: Johan Gustaf Henning Schmiterlöw
