= Ove Ljung =

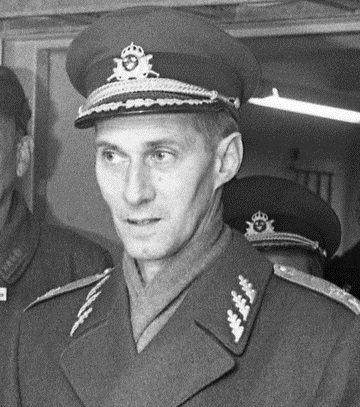
- Ove Ljung in 1967.
- Born: Per-Ove Poul Ljung; 18 May 1918; Jönköping, Sweden
- Died: 31 May 1997 (aged 79); Solna, Sweden
- Military career
- Allegiance: Sweden
- Branch: Swedish Army
- Service years: 1940–1974
- Rank: Lieutenant General
- Commands: Life Regiment Grenadiers; Chief of the Army Staff; General Staff Corps; Master-General of the Ordnance; Royal Swedish Army Materiel Administration; Eastern Military District; Commandant General in Stockholm
- Other work: Head of Defence Materiel Administration

Lieutenant General Per-Ove Poul Ljung (18 May 1918 – 31 May 1997) was a Swedish Army officer. His senior commands include Chief of the Army Staff and the General Staff Corps, Master-General of the Ordnance, head of the Royal Swedish Army Materiel Administration, military commander of the Eastern Military District (Milo Ö) and Commandant General in Stockholm. Ljung retired from the military in 1974 and then served as Director General of the Defence Materiel Administration from 1974 to 1982.

== Early life ==
Ljung was born on 18 May 1918 in Jönköping, Sweden, the son of Per Ljung, an accountant, and his wife Martha (née Jensen). He passed studentexamen in 1937.

== Career ==
=== Military career ===
Ljung was commissioned as an officer in 1939. He belonged to an officer course, which, due to the increasingly threatening world political situation, had a dramatic shortening of their education in order to join units and strengthen the Swedish preparedness. Ljung was commissioned into the Jönköping-Kalmar Regiment (I 12) in Eksjö as second lieutenant in 1940 and then attended the Swedish School of Sport and Health Sciences in 1942 and was promoted to lieutenant the same year. During the following years he held alternately troop, staff and teaching positions. Ljung attended the Royal Swedish Army Staff College in 1948 and was promoted to captain the same year. Ljung then served in the General Staff Corps in 1950 and in 1955 he served as captain in the Northern Scanian Infantry Regiment (I 6) in Kristianstad. He was promoted to major in 1957 and served again in the General Staff Corps and as chief of staff of the I Military District in Kristianstad. In 1959 Ljung attended the Swedish National Defence College and in 1960 he was appointed head of the Organization Department of the Army Staff. A year later he was promoted to lieutenant colonel. In 1963 he was promoted to colonel and was appointed head of Section I of the Army Staff.

Ljung was appointed commanding officer of the Life Regiment Grenadiers (I 3) in 1964 and in 1966 he was promoted to major general and appointed Chief of the Army Staff and the General Staff Corps. He was also from 1966 serving as the Master-General of the Ordnance and acting head of the Royal Swedish Army Materiel Administration. Ljung was appointed head of the Army Materiel Administration (Armématerielförvaltningen, FMV-A) at the Defence Materiel Administration in 1968, a position he held for one year before being appointed military commander of the Eastern Military District (Milo Ö) and Commandant General in Stockholm. Ljung held this post until 1974 when he retired from the military and was appointed Director General of the Defence Materiel Administration. He served as Director General until 1982.

=== Other work ===
Ljung was a member of the board of the Central Federation for Voluntary Military Training (Centralförbundet för befälsutbildning) and the National Board of the Swedish Women's Voluntary Defence Organization (Lottaöverstyrelsen). He was also a member of the Administration Board of the Swedish Armed Forces and the board of the Swedish National Defence Research Institute from 1966 to 1968. Ljung was chairman of the Central Joint Consultation Board of the Swedish Armed Forces (Försvarets centrala företagsnämnd) from 1968 to 1974 and a member of the board of the Idun Society (Sällskapet Idun) from 1968 to 1990 and chairman of the same from 1981 to 1990.

Ljugn was a member of the State Administration's Central Cooperation Council for Human Resources (Statsförvaltningens centrala samarbetsråd för personalfrågor) from 1969 to 1974 and of the Industrial Council of the Royal Swedish Academy of Engineering Sciences from 1974. He was a member of the board of the Home Guard Fund (Hemvärnsfonden) from 1975 and vice chairman of the National Swedish Board of Economic Defence from 1975 to 1977. Ljung was a member of the board of the County Council's Fund for Technology Procurement and Product Development (Landstingets fond för teknikupphandling och produktutveckling) from 1982.

== Personal life ==
In 1942 he married Inga-Maj Sjöholm (born 1918), the daughter of Ture Sjöholm and Gerda (née von Porat). He was the father of Per (born 1943) and Anders (born 1948).

== Dates of rank ==
- 1940 – Second lieutenant
- 1942 – Lieutenant
- 1948 – Captain
- 1957 – Major
- 1961 – Lieutenant colonel
- 1963 – Colonel
- 1966 – Major general
- 1969 – Lieutenant general

== Awards and decorations ==
=== Swedish ===
- (Sweden) Commander of the Order of the Sword (6 June 1966)
- (Sweden) Knight of the Order of the Sword
- (Sweden) Swedish Women's Voluntary Defence Organization Royal Medal of Merit in silver

=== Foreign ===
- (Norway) Grand Cross of the Order of St. Olav (1 July 1979)

== Honours ==
- Member of the Royal Swedish Academy of War Sciences in 1964, (president 1975–1977)
- Member of the Royal Swedish Academy of Engineering Sciences in 1979, (chairman of Department XI 1982–1985)
- Honorary member of the Royal Swedish Society of Naval Sciences in 1975

Military offices
Preceded by Stig Synnergren	Chief of the Army Staff; General Staff Corps; 1966–1968	Succeeded by Karl Eric Holm
Preceded by Sten Wåhlin	Master-General of the Ordnance; Royal Swedish Army Materiel Administration; 1966–1968	Succeeded by None
Preceded by Carl Eric Almgren	Eastern Military District; 1969–1974	Succeeded by Nils Sköld
Preceded by Carl Eric Almgren	Commandant General in Stockholm; 1969–1974	Succeeded by Nils Sköld
Government offices
Preceded by Sten Wåhlin	Defence Materiel Administration; 1974–1982	Succeeded by Carl-Olof Ternryd
Professional and academic associations
Preceded by Bengt Lundvall	President of the Royal Swedish Academy of War Sciences; 1975–1977	Succeeded by Dick Stenberg
