= Royal Swedish Academy of War Sciences =

Military-related organization

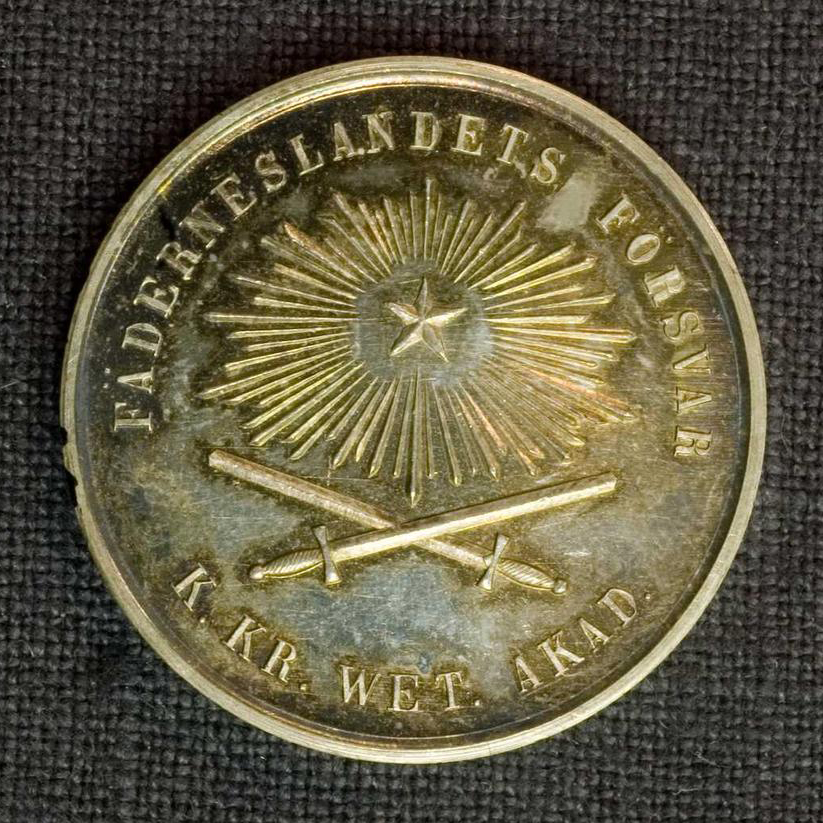
Attendance jeton issued by the academy

The Royal Swedish Academy of War Sciences (Swedish: Kungliga Krigsvetenskapsakademien) is one of the Royal Academies in Sweden. It was founded on 12 November 1796 by Gustaf Wilhelm af Tibell as the "Swedish Warman Society". Gustaf Wilhelm's society became the Royal Swedish Academy of War Sciences in 1805. It is one of the earliest organisations of its type in Europe.

The academy is an independent organization, and a forum for military (army and air force) and defense studies, as well as national security issues. Membership is limited to 160 chairs under the age of 70.

== Presidents ==
- 1799–1800: Per Ulrik Lilliehorn
- ????–????: ?
- 1805–1806: Salomon von Rajalin
- 1815–????: Anders Fredrik Skjöldebrand
- ????–????: ?
- 1904–1906: Richard Berg
- ????–????: ?
- ????–????: Gustaf Uggla
- ????–????: Herman Wrangel
- 1922–1923: Hugo Jungstedt
- ????–????: Gustaf Dyrssen
- 1927–1929: Henning von Krusenstierna
- 1929–1931: Bror Munck
- 1931–1933: Carl Gustaf Hammarskjöld
- 1933–1935: Fredrik Riben
- 1935–1937: Ludvig Hammarskiöld
- 1937–1939: Oscar Nygren
- 1939–1941: Otto Lybeck
- 1941–1943: Lennart Lilliehöök
- 1943–1945: Erik Testrup
- 1945–1947: Archibald Douglas
- 1948–1949: Bengt Nordenskiöld
- 1949–1951: Helge Strömbäck
- 1951–1953: Birger Hedqvist
- 1953–1955: Stig H:son Ericson
- 1955–1957: Axel Ljungdahl
- 1957–1959: Ivar Gewert
- 1959–1961: Erik Samuelson
- 1961–1963: Rudolf Kolmodin
- 1963–1965: Bert Carpelan
- 1965–1967: Lage Thunberg
- 1967–1969: Åke Lindemalm
- 1969–1971: Carl Eric Almgren
- 1971–1973: Stig Norén
- 1973–1975: Bengt Lundvall
- 1975–1977: Ove Ljung
- 1977–1979: Dick Stenberg
- 1979–1982: Gunnar Thyresson
- 1982–1985: Gunnar Eklund
- 1985–1988: Per Sköld
- 1988–1991: Sven-Olof Olson
- 1991–1996: Carl-Olof Ternryd
- 1996–1999: Peter Nordbeck
- 1999–2002: Jörn Beckmann
- 2002–2006: Erik Norberg
- 2007–2010: Bo Huldt
- 2010–2014: Frank Rosenius
- 2014–2018: Mikael Odenberg
- 2018–2022: Sverker Göranson
- 2022–2026: Björn von Sydow
- 2026–present: Jonas Haggren

== Notable members ==
- Karl Amundson
- Magnus Ranstorp
- Mertil Melin
- Michael Moore
- Frederik Due (honorary member)
- Anders Tegnell
- Fabian Jakob Wrede

== See also ==
- Society and Defense
- Swedish Army
- Swedish Air Force
