= Artillery and Engineering College =

- Artilleri- och ingenjörhögskolan
- Active: 1878–1992
- Country: Sweden
- Allegiance: Swedish Armed Forces
- Branch: Swedish Army
- Type: Staff college
- Garrison/HQ: Stockholm

Artillery and Engineering College (Swedish: Artilleri- och ingenjörhögskolan, AIHS) was a Swedish Army training establishment active between 1878 and 1992, providing courses for artillery officers. It was located within the Stockholm Garrison in Stockholm, Sweden.

== History ==
The Higher Artillery School (Högre artilleriläroverket) at Marieberg was established in 1818. It was initially intended only for the training of artillery officers but after 1830 it was extended gradually to a staff college for the entire armed forces. Between 1842 and 1870 the training of engineers was also located there. The school was transformed in 1866 into a staff college, which in turn in 1878 was divided into two schools, the Royal Swedish Army Staff College and the Artillery and Engineering College.

It was moved in 1885 from Marieberg in Stockholm to Artillerigården at Östermalm in Stockholm and underwent restrictive changes in 1904. Teaching was divided into two programmes, an artillery programme and an fortification programme, each with a general and a higher course. The general course constituted conditions for promotion to lieutenant in the Artillery and the Swedish Fortification Corps.

The general artillery course began every year on 1 October and continued, with interruptions from 1 July (16 July for position artillery officers) to 1 October, to 1 February of the following year evenly. The general fortification course began 1 October every odd-numbered year and lasted for two years, and was followed by a one-year long higher course. The two general courses were in 1922 one-year long (October to August). The higher courses were two-year long (autumn every even year to mid-August, immediately following even years). After 1942, the programmes also included anti-aircraft courses, and after 1947 also signal courses.

The Artillery and Engineering College moved in 1926 to the so-called Grey House (Grå huset), the military staff building at Östermalmsgatan 87. The Swedish Army Museum now had access to parts of the facilities. On 1 October 1951 the Royal Swedish Army Staff College and the Artillery and Engineering College were merged. The higher courses of the Artillery and Engineering College were incorporated into the Royal Swedish Army Staff College, while the lower were transferred to the newly formed Army Artillery and Engineer Officers’ School (Artilleri- och Ingenjörofficersskolan, AIOS).

== Heraldry and traditions ==
=== Coat of arms ===
The coat of the arms of the Artillery and Engineering College (AIRS) 1982–1984. Blazon: "Azure, two gunbarrels of older pattern in saltire gules surmounted a cluster of rays coming down from a mullet, all or".

== Commanding officers ==
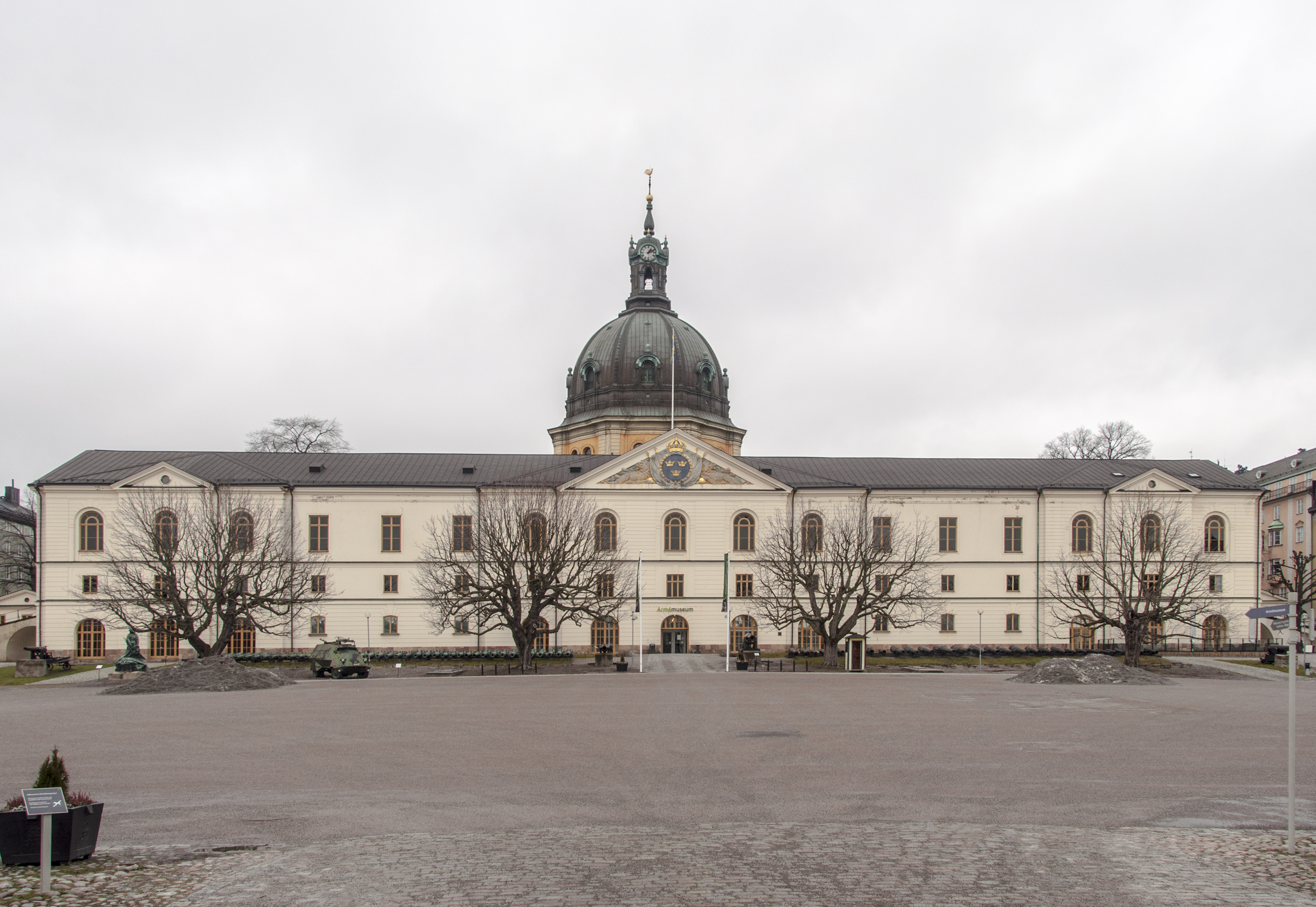
The building at Riddargatan 13 in Stockholm where the Artillery and Engineering College was located from 1885 to 1926.

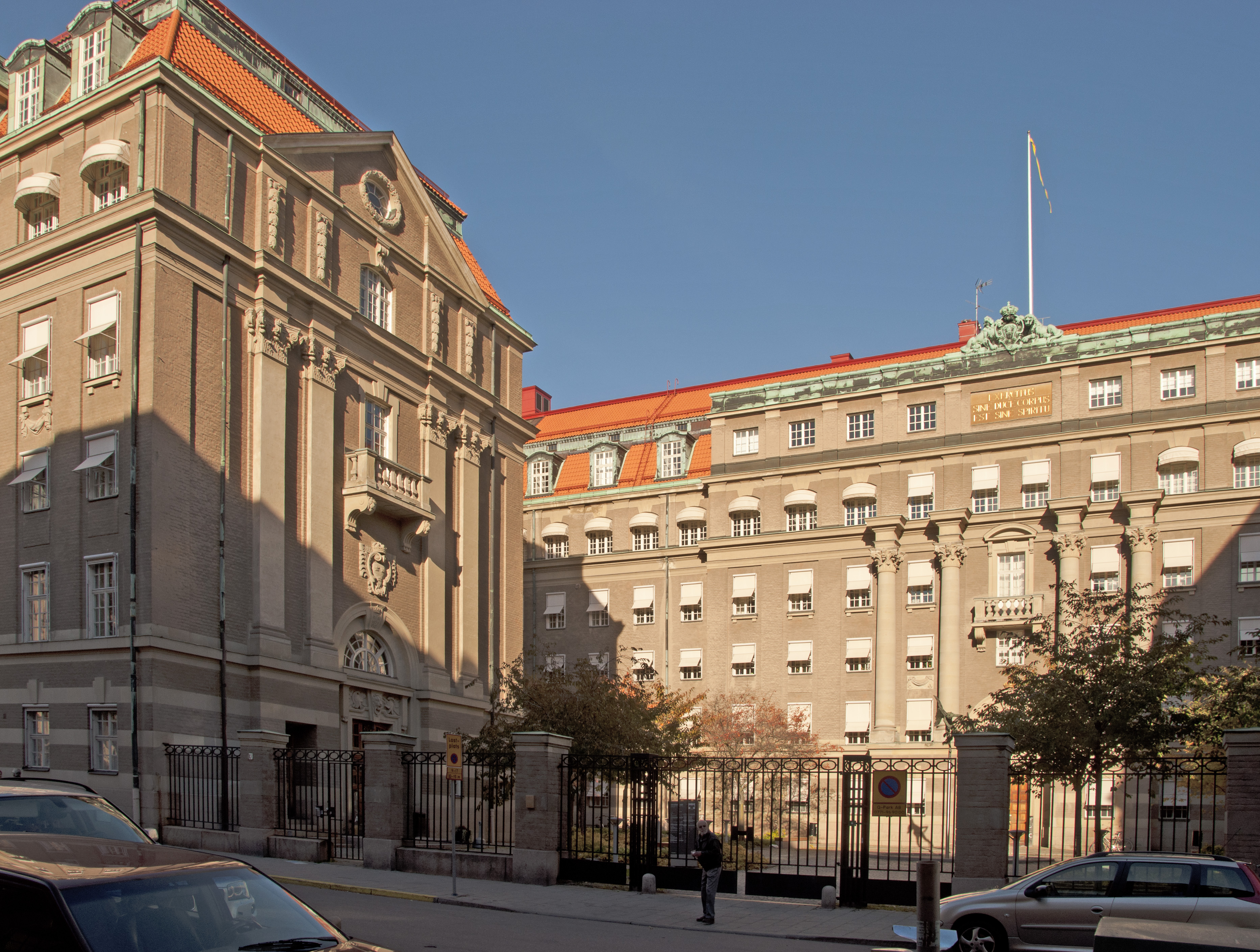
The building at Östermalmsgatan 87 in Stockholm where the Artillery and Engineering College was located from 1926.

- 1878–1891: ?
- 1891–1898: Herman Holmberg
- 1898–1904: ?
- 1904–1911: William Bergman
- 1911–1915: Sixten E Schmidt
- 1915–1922: Per Sylvan
- 1922–1930: Axel Lagerfelt
- 1930–1934: Sune Bergelin
- 1934–1938: Ragnar Sjöberg
- 1938–1941: Hugo Stendahl
- 1941–1942: Carl Årmann
- 1942–1946: Ivan Thorson
- 1946–1951: Erik Kihlblom
- 1950–1951: Karl Ångström
- 1951–1956: Georg von Döbeln
- 1956–1990: ?
- 1990–1992: Lennart Uller

== Names, designations and locations ==
Names	Translation	From		To
Artilleri- och ingenjörhögskolan	[Swedish] Army Artillery and Engineering College	1878-11-01	–	1951-09-30
Artilleri- och ingenjörofficersskolan	[Swedish] Army Artillery and Engineer Officers' School	1951-10-01	–	1972-06-30
Artilleri- och ingenjörregementesofficersskolan	[Swedish] Army Artillery and Regimental Engineer Officers' School	1972-07-01	–	1983-05-31
Artilleri- och ingenjörhögskolan	[Swedish] Army Artillery and Engineering College	1983-06-01	–	1992-08-31
Designations		From		To
AIHS		1878-11-01	–	1951-09-30
AIOS		1951-10-01	–	1972-06-30
AIRS		1972-07-01	–	1983-05-31
AIHS		1983-06-01	–	1992-08-31
Location		From		To
Stockholm Garrison		1878-11-01	–	1992-08-31
