= Royal Swedish Army Materiel Administration =

Swedish central government agency

The Royal Swedish Army Materiel Administration (Swedish: Kungliga Arméförvaltningen, KAF) was a Swedish central government agency that replaced the War College in 1865. It was active between the years 1866 and 1954.

== History ==
The Ministry (Intendentsdepartementet) was constituted along with the Artillery Department, Fortification Department, Civil Department, as the Army Materiel Administration, on 1 January 1866. The Ministry consisted of military offices, the chamber office, and secretariat. After 1881 it consisted of a military bureau and a civilian bureau. The military bureau was divided in 1907 into an equipment bureau (in 1911 with a technical audit) and a maintenance bureau. A medical bureau was added in 1893 with the transfer of the medical field office. In 1907 this became independent on the same level as the other departments.

When the Army Materiel Administration in 1937 underwent a major reorganization, the Ministry changed its name from Intendentsdepartementet to Intendenturdepartementet, which came to consist of six bureaus: central bureau, maintenance bureau, barracks investigation bureau, equine and veterinary bureau and a civilian bureau as well as a technical audit office. In 1940 a seventh bureau was added, the industrial agency and in 1942 an eighth, the motor fuel bureau.

As early as 1 January 1944, the next major change occurred in the Army Materiel Administration, when the fortification board and the medical board became independent government agencies (as Fortification Administration (Arméns fortifikationsförvaltning) and the Medical Services Administration of the Swedish Armed Forces). After this the Army Materiel Administration consisted of an ordnance department, a civilian bureau and supply department; the latter consisting of central, industrial (suspended in 1945), maintenance, motor fuel, barracks investigation (suspended in 1952) and the equine and veterinary stock bureaus—as well as the inventory control office.

The Army Materiel Administration was disbanded on 1 July 1954. Its duties were taken over by the Royal Swedish Army Supply Administration and the Royal Swedish Army Ordnance Administration.

== See also ==
- Royal Swedish Air Force Materiel Administration
- Royal Swedish Naval Materiel Administration
