= Folke Rehnström =

Swedish Army officer (1942–2020)

- Born: Sven Evert Folke Rehnström; 3 November 1942; Halmstad, Sweden
- Died: 1 September 2020 (aged 77); Hudiksvall, Sweden
- Military career
- Allegiance: Sweden
- Branch: Swedish Army
- Service years: 1967–2002
- Rank: Lieutenant General
- Commands: Deputy Director-General, Defence Materiel Administration; Chief of Staff, Milo N; Joint Forces Directorate

Lieutenant General Sven Evert Folke Rehnström (3 November 1942 – 1 September 2020) was a senior Swedish Army officer. Rehnström served as Chief of the Joint Forces Directorate from 1998 to 2002.

== Early life ==
Rehnström was born on 3 November 1942 in Halmstad Parish, Halland County, Sweden. Rehnström graduated from the Military Academy Karlberg in 1967 and was commissioned as an officer the same year in Wendes Artillery Regiment.

== Career ==
He attended the Artillery Officers' School at the Artillery and Engineering Officers School from 1969 to 1970, and was promoted to captain in 1972. Rehnström attended the Swedish Armed Forces Staff College from 1972 to 1975. In August 1975, the then captain Rehnström of Wendes Regiment, was awarded the Royal Swedish Army Staff College Association Scholarship Fund's (Föreningen krigshögskolans stipendiefond) scholarship for 1975. The scholarship, which was SEK 3,000, was awarded in connection with the Swedish Armed Forces Staff College's higher 2-year courses. Rehnström received the scholarship for demonstrated outstanding skill. It was to be used for military science studies abroad. He then served in the Army Staff from 1975 to 1980 (from 1977 as office head), and was part-time teacher of general tactics at the Artillery and Engineering Regimental Officers School from 1976 to 1981. He was promoted to major in the General Staff Corps on 1 September 1978, and then served in the Program Department in the Planning Command (Planeringsledningen) in the Defence Staff from 1980 to 1981. Rehnström was posted to Småland Artillery Regiment between 1981 and 1983.

In 1983, he was promoted to lieutenant colonel, after which he was head of the Program Department in the Planning Command from 1983 to 1986. Rehnström served in the System Department in the Main Department for Army Equipment in the Defence Materiel Administration from 1986 to 1987 and as battalion commander in Karlskrona Coastal Artillery Regiment from 1987 to 1988. He was promoted to colonel on 1 July 1989 and appointed Deputy Director-General of the Defence Materiel Administration (FMV) and head of FMV's Main Department for Central Management. Rehnström was promoted to major general in 1991. He served at FMV until 1994. In 1994, Rhenström was considered as a potential candidate for the position of Chief of the Joint Operations Command at the Swedish Armed Forces Headquarters by the then Supreme Commander, General Bengt Gustafsson. However, Rhenström's plans clashed with Defence Minister Anders Björck's preferences. Instead, Major General Percurt Green was chosen as the Chief of Joint Operations Command after consultation with the incoming Supreme Commander at that time, General Owe Wictorin. Instead, Rehnström was appointed deputy director-general (departementsråd) in Ministry of Defence. He then served as Chief of Staff in Northern Military District from 1995 to 1996. Rehnström was promoted to lieutenant general in 1996 and was director and head of the Main Unit for the Military Part of the Total Defense in the Ministry of Defence from 1996 to 1998. Rehnström was then the first Chief of the Joint Forces Directorate (Krigsförbandsledningen) in the Swedish Armed Forces Headquarters from 1998 to 2002.

== Personal life ==
He was married to Gunilla (Nilla).

== Dates of rank ==
- 1967 – Second lieutenant
- 19?? – Lieutenant
- 1972 – Captain
- 1 September 1978 – Major
- 1983 – Lieutenant colonel
- 1 July 1989 – Colonel
- (Note: Rehnström was promoted directly from colonel to major general, passed senior colonel, when he was appointed Deputy Director-General of the Swedish Defence Materiel Administration from 1 July 1989.) – Senior colonel
- 1 July 1989 – Major general
- 1996 – Lieutenant general

== Honours ==
- Member of the Royal Swedish Academy of War Sciences (1986)

== Footnotes ==
Military offices
Preceded by Tomas Warming	Chief of Staff of the Northern Military District; 1995–1996	Succeeded by Lars G. Persson
Preceded by None	Joint Forces Directorate; 1998–2002	Succeeded by Mats Nilsson
