= Northern Air Command =

- Norra flygkommandot
- Active: 1994–2000
- Country: Sweden
- Allegiance: Swedish Armed Forces
- Branch: Swedish Air Force
- Type: Air command
- Role: STRIL
- Garrison/HQ: Luleå
- March: "Vingar över Norrland" (Granath) (Note: The unit march was adopted on 27 September 1994 and was established on 13 June 1996.)

Aircraft flown
- Fighter: JA 37
- Multirole helicopter: AJSF 37, AJSH 37
- Reconnaissance: SF 37, SH 37
- Trainer: Sk 37

The Northern Air Command (Swedish: Norra flygkommandot, FKN) was an air command within the Swedish Air Force that operated from 1994 to 2000. The unit was based in Luleå in Luleå Garrison. It was responsible for air surveillance over northern Sweden.

== History ==
The Northern Air Command was an air command within the Swedish Air Force with an area of responsibility for air surveillance within the Northern Military District (Milo N). The history of the Northern Air Command goes back to 1957, when the concept of air defence sector was established, which were added by assigning responsibility to ten wings over eleven air defence sectors. In 1981, the number of sectors was reduced to four where Jämtland Wing (F 4) and Norrbotten Wing (F 21) became large sector wings, with the designation F 4/Se NN (Sector Lower Norrland, N 3) and F 21/Se ÖN (Sector Upper Norrland, ÖN 3), and was responsible for air surveillance over northern Sweden.

In connection with the Defence Act of 1992, it was decided that the four air defence sector units would be disbanded, and instead reorganized into regular wings. In its place, responsibility for the air defence sectors would be assigned to three newly established air commands.

On 1 July 1993, three new regional command organizations were formed – for northern, central, and southern Sweden. With it, the air defence sector staff at F 4 was disbanded and staff at F 21 was reorganized and formed the embryo of the Northern Air Command. Initially, the staff was integrated into F 21, which was designated F 21/FKN. On 1 July 1994, the staff was separated from the wing, and at the same time became a cadre-organized war unit within the Northern Military District (Milo N).

In the years 1993–1995, tasks from 1st Air Command (E 1) were also transferred to the three air commands. This was because the Defence Act of 1992 also included that the 1st Air Command was to be disbanded.

Prior to the Defence Act of 2000, the Swedish government proposed in its bill for the Riksdag that the tactical level should be reduced by disbanding division and military district staffs as well as naval commands and air commands. This was to design an Army Command, Navy Command and Air Force Command which would be co-located with the Joint Operations Command (Operationsledningen, OPL). The proposal meant that all territorial staffs would be disbanded, which meant, among other things, that the three air command staffs were disbanded on 30 June 2000.

In its place, the Air Force Command was formed on 1 July 2000, which geographically encompassed the three former air commands.

== Units ==
Between 1 July 1994 and 30 June 2000, the following units were part of the Northern Air Command. However, the Hälsinge Wing was disbanded on 30 June 1998.

- Jämtland Wing
  - 41st Fighter Division (JA 37 Viggen)
  - 42nd Fighter Division (JA 37 Viggen)
- Hälsinge Wing
  - 151st Attack Division (AJS 37 Viggen)
  - 152nd Attack Division (AJS 37 Viggen)
  - TIS 37 (Sk 37 Viggen)
- Norrbotten Wing
  - 211th Reconnaissance Division (SF 37/SH 37 Viggen)
  - 212th Fighter Division (JA 37 Viggen)
  - 213th Fighter Division (JA 37 Viggen)

== Aircraft ==
The aircraft that were part of the air command formally belonged to the wings involved.

Fighter aircraft

- 1994–2000: JA 37

Attack aircraft

- 1994–1995: AJ 37
- 1995–1997: AJS 37

Trainer aircraft

- 1994–1997: Sk 37
- 1997–2000: Sk 37E

Reconnaissance aircraft

- 1994–1995: SF 37
- 1994–1995: SH 37
- 1995–2000: AJSF 37
- 1995–2000: AJSH 37

== Heraldry and traditions ==
=== Coat of arms ===
The coat of the arms of the Northern Air Command (FKM) from 1994 to 2000. Blazon: "Or, an erazed head of an eagle azure armed and langued gules, a chief azure charged with a winged twinbladed propeller or. The shield surmounted an erect sword or."

Coat of arms of the Northern Air Command (FKN) from 1994 to 2000.

=== March ===
The march of the Northern Air Command, "Vingar över Norrland", was composed by the military and regional musician Börje Granath.

=== Traditions ===
The traditions of the Northern Air Command are today continued by the Norrbotten Wing in Luleå.

== Commanding officers ==
The commander was subordinate to the military commander of Northern Military District.

=== Commanders ===
- 1994–1994: Senior Colonel Kent Harrskog
- 1994–1995: Senior Colonel Gunnar Ståhl
- 1995–1996: Senior Colonel Kjell Nilsson
- 1996–1999: Senior Colonel Tord Karlsson
- 1999–2000: Colonel Göte Pudas

=== Deputy commanders ===
- 1994–1995: Colonel Curt Westberg

=== Chiefs of staff ===
- 1994–1995: Lieutenant Colonel Christer Köhler
- 1995–1997: Colonel Jan Otterström
- 1997–1999: Colonel Göte Pudas
- 1999–2000: Lieutenant Colonel Sven Hellqvist

== Names, designations and locations ==
Name	Translation	From		To
Norra flygkommandot	Northern Air Command	1994-07-01	–	2000-06-30
Designation		From		To
FKN		1994-07-01	–	2000-06-30
Location		From		To
Luleå Garrison		1994-07-01	–	2000-06-30
Air bases		From		To
?		1994-07-01	–	2000-06-30

== See also ==
- Central Air Command
- Southern Air Command
