= Kjell Nilsson (Swedish Air Force officer) =

Swedish Air Force Officer (1943–2018)

- Born: Kjell Gustav Nilsson; 2 August 1943; Karlskoga, Sweden
- Died: 12 January 2018 (aged 74); Stockholm, Sweden
- Military career
- Allegiance: Sweden
- Branch: Swedish Air Force
- Service years: 1967–2000
- Rank: Lieutenant General
- Commands: Uppland Wing; Acting Chief of the Air Staff; Northern Air Command; Chief of Staff, Milo N; Joint Operations Command

Lieutenant General Kjell Gustav Nilsson (2 August 1943 – 12 January 2018) was a Swedish Air Force officer, ice hockey player and sports administrator. Nilsson's senior commands includes commander of the Northern Air Command (1995–1996), Chief of Staff of the Northern Military District (1996–1998), and Chief of Joint Operations Command (1998–2000). Nilsson served as chairman of the Swedish Ice Hockey Association from June 2002 to June 2004.

== Career ==
=== Military career ===
Nilsson began his military career as an air force officer candidate in 1964 at the Swedish Air Force Flying School in Ljungbyhed. Nilsson was commissioned as an officer in the Swedish Air Force in 1967 as second lieutenant. He was promoted to lieutenant in 1969 and to captain in 1972. Nilsson served as squadron commander at Bråvalla Wing in Norrköping from 1973 to 1976. During his career, Nilsson flew, among others, J 28 Vampire, Saab 29 Tunnan, Saab 32 Lansen, Saab 35 Draken and Saab 37 Viggen. He was promoted to major in 1978 and to lieutenant colonel in 1983. From 1984 to 1986, he was head of the Aviation Unit at Uppland Wing and from 1986 to 1987, Nilsson served as head of the Aviation Service Detail (Flygtjänstdetaljen) the Air Staff. From 1988 to 1989 he was head of the Personnel Administration Department in the Air Staff and from 1989 to 1990, he studied at the Air War College in United States. Nilsson was promoted to colonel on 1 July 1990 and served as Deputy Sector Wing Commander and Wing Commander of Uppland Wing (F 16/Se M) in Uppsala.

On 1 July 1992, Nilsson was promoted to senior colonel and he then served from 1992 to 1994 as head of the Production Command (Produktionsledningen) in the Air Staff. From 1993 to 1994 he was Acting Chief of the Air Staff. From 1994 to 1995, Nilsson was head of the Production Department in the Air Force Command and from 1995 to 1996, he was head of the Northern Air Command. In 1996, Nilsson was promoted to major general and was appointed Chief of Staff of the Northern Military District. Two years later, on 1 July 1998, Nilsson was promoted to lieutenant general and was appointed Chief of the Joint Operations Command (Operationsledningen, OPL). He retired from active service in 2000.

=== Sports career ===
Nilsson began his hockey career in Värmland where he represented IFK Bofors. He was seen early on as a great talent who also played for Värmland who won the TV-pucken's premiere year in 1959. Later in his career, he represented AIK and Rögle, among others. In the latter club he was also chairman from 2005 to 2009.

== Personal life ==
He was married to Maud from Karlskoga and they had two children. Nilsson lived in Vallentuna where he was the coach of Vallentuna hockey school, youth team, junior and senior team.

== Death ==
Nilsson died on 12 January 2018 in Stockholm. The funeral took place on 9 February 2018 in Barkåkra Church, Ängelholm. He was interred on 9 February 2018 at Nya Kyrkogården in Barkåkra Parish.

== Dates of rank ==
- 1967 – Second lieutenant
- 1969 – Lieutenant
- 1972 – Captain
- 1978 – Major
- 1983 – Lieutenant colonel
- 1 July 1990 – Colonel
- 1 July 1992 – Senior colonel
- 1996 – Major general
- 1998 – Lieutenant general

Military offices
Preceded by Swen Persson	Deputy Sector Wing Commander, Uppland Wing; 1990–1992	Succeeded by Ulf Sveding
Preceded by Bernt Östh	Acting Chief of the Air Staff; 1993–1994	Succeeded by None
Preceded by ?	Production Department in the Air Force Command; 1994–1995	Succeeded by Curt Westberg
Preceded by Lars G. Persson	Chief of Staff of the Northern Military District; 1996–1998	Succeeded by Lars Frisk
Preceded by Gunnar Ståhl	Northern Air Command; 1995–1996	Succeeded by Tord Karlsson
Preceded by Percurt Green	Chief of the Joint Operations Command; 1998–2000	Succeeded by None
Civic offices
Preceded by Rickard Fagerlund	Chairman of the Swedish Ice Hockey Association; 2002–2004	Succeeded by Christer Englund
