= Rickard Fagerlund =

Swedish ice hockey player and manager

- Born: 25 January 1937 Södertälje, Sweden
- Died: 31 December 2009 (aged 72)
- Position: Defenceman
- Played for: BK Star, Södertälje SK, GAIS, IFK Norrköping, IK Oskarshamn
- National team: Sweden
- Playing career: 1956–1965

Rickard Fagerlund (born 25 January 1937 in Södertälje, Sweden, died 31 December 2009) was a Swedish ice hockey player and manager. Playing as a defenceman for Södertälje SK, he won the Swedish national championship in 1956. He also played for GAIS, IFK Norrköping and IK Oskarshamn, before coaching HC Vita Hästen.

Between 17 September 1983 and 15 June 2002, Fagerlund was the chairman of the Swedish Ice Hockey Association. He was posthumously inducted into the IIHF Hall of Fame in 2010.

Civic offices
Preceded by Arne Grunander	Chairman of the Swedish Ice Hockey Association; 17 September 1983 – 15 June 2002	Succeeded by Kjell Nilsson
