= Lars G. Persson =

Swedish Coastal Artillery officer (born 1937)

- Born: Lars Göran Persson; 13 May 1937 (age 89); Gothenburg, Sweden
- Military career
- Allegiance: Sweden
- Branch: Coastal Artillery (Swedish Navy)
- Service years: 1960–1998
- Rank: Lieutenant General
- Commands: Vaxholm Coastal Artillery Regiment; Härnösand Coastal Artillery Regiment; Norrland Coastal Artillery Defence; Operations Section 2, Fst; Chief of the Naval Staff; Northern Military District

Lieutenant General Lars Göran Persson (born 13 May 1937) was a Swedish Coastal Artillery officer. Persson was Chief of the Naval Staff from 1987 to 1994 and Chief of Staff and Military Commander of the Northern Military District from 1996 to 1998.

== Early life ==
Persson was born on 13 May 1937 in Göteborgs Carl Johans Parish, Gothenburg, Sweden the son of Samuel Persson, a traffic inspector, and his wife Hanna (née Samuelson). Persson passed studentexamen in 1957.

== Career ==
He graduated from the Royal Swedish Naval Academy and was commissioned as a naval officer in 1960 with the rank of second lieutenant the same year and assigned to Gotland Coastal Artillery Corps, where he served as a platoon leader from 1960 to 1964. He was promoted to lieutenant in 1962, and served as platoon leader and artillery battery commander in Älvsborg Coastal Artillery Regiment from 1964 to 1967, and attended the Swedish Armed Forces Staff College from 1967 to 1970. He was promoted to captain in 1968 and served from 1970 to 1972 in the Naval Operations Department at the staff of the Southern Military District. In 1972, Persson was promoted first to major and later the same year to lieutenant colonel, whereupon he was assigned as a strategy teacher at the Swedish Armed Forces Staff College from 1972 to 1976. Persson attended the Marine Corps Command and Staff College at Marine Corps Base Quantico in United States from 1973 to 1974 and was head of the Swedish Coastal Artillery's Personnel and Organization Department in Section 4 of the Naval Staff from 1976 to 1980.

In May 1980, Persson was appointed commandant of Kungsholms Fortress in the Blekinge archipelago, where in the autumn he would succeed Lieutenant Colonel Urban Sobéus. After commanding the barrier battalion in Vaxholm Coastal Artillery Regiment from 1980 to 1981, Persson was promoted to colonel in 1981 and then served as commander of the regiment from 1981 to 1983. He was promoted to senior colonel on 1 April 1983 and assumed the position as commanding officer of Norrland Coastal Artillery Defence (Norrlands kustartilleriförsvar) and the Härnösand Coastal Artillery Regiment (KA 5) in Härnösand. On 1 October 1984, Persson assumed the position as head of Operations Section 2 at the Operations Command in the Defence Staff, which he served in until 1987. On 1 April 1987, he was promoted to major general and was appointed Chief of the Naval Staff. In February 1993, his appointment was prolonged from 1 April until 1 July 1994. From 1994 to 1996, he was operations manager for international affairs at the Operations Command in the Swedish Armed Forces Headquarters and was Chief of Staff of the Northern Military District in 1996. Later that year (1996) he was promoted to lieutenant general, whereupon he served as military commander inof the Northern Military District from 1996 to 1998. Persson retired from the military in 1998. From 1999 to 2003, Persson was active as a military adviser in Latvia.

== Personal life ==
In 1960, he married Barbro Göttberg (born 1937), the daughter of Sven Göttberg and Torborg (née Sanderson).

== Dates of rank ==
- 1960 – Second lieutenant
- 1962 – Lieutenant
- 1968 – Captain
- 1972 – Major
- 1972 – Lieutenant colonel
- 1981 – Colonel
- 1 April 1983 – Senior colonel
- 1 April 1987 – Major general
- 1996 – Lieutenant general

== Awards and decorations ==
- (Norway) Commander with Star of the Royal Norwegian Order of Merit (1 July 1992)

== Honours ==
- Member of the Royal Swedish Society of Naval Sciences (1975)
- Honorary member of the Royal Swedish Society of Naval Sciences (2013)
- Member of the Royal Swedish Academy of War Sciences (1982)

== Bibliography ==
- Persson, Lars-Göran; Stålhandske, Lennart, eds. (1977). KA 75 år: en bildkavalkad (in Swedish). Stockholm: Kustartilleriklubben. SELIBR 221984.

Military offices
Preceded by Torsten Engberg	Chief of the Naval Staff; 1987–1994	Succeeded by None
Preceded by Folke Rehnström	Chief of Staff of the Northern Military District; 1996–1996	Succeeded by Kjell Nilsson
Preceded by Curt Sjöö	Northern Military District; 1996–1998	Succeeded by Mertil Melin
