= Kent Harrskog =

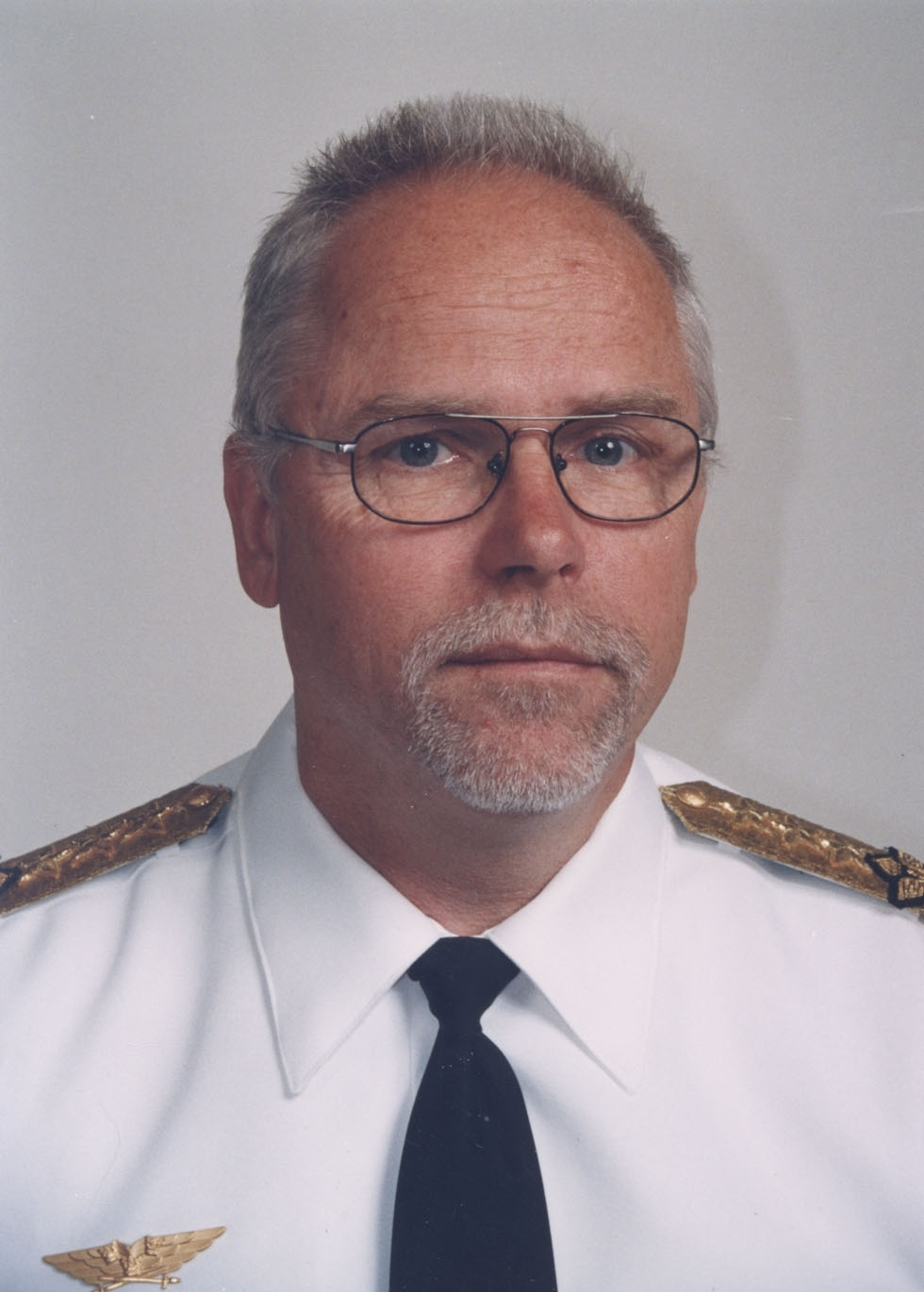
- Born: Kent Holger Harrskog; 11 November 1944 (age 81); Finspång, Sweden
- Military career
- Allegiance: Sweden
- Branch: Swedish Air Force
- Service years: 1967–2000
- Rank: Lieutenant General
- Commands: Norrbotten Wing; Northern Air Command; Chief of Air Force Command; Southern Military District
- Other work: Military expert at MoD; Advisor for Saab

Lieutenant General Kent Holger Harrskog (born 11 November 1944) is a retired Swedish Air Force officer. He was Chief of Air Force Command from 1994 to 1998 and military commander of the Southern Military District from 1998 to 2000.

== Early life ==
Harrskog was born on 11 November 1944 in Finspång, Sweden and grew up in Högsjö, Vingåker Municipality. He was the son of Holger Harrskog and his wife Elsa (née Anderson). He passed studentexamen in Katrineholm in 1964 and joined the Swedish Air Force as an aspirant the same year. Harrskog finished first in his class at the Swedish Air Force Flying School in 1965.

== Career ==
Harrskog graduated from the Royal Swedish Air Force College (Kungliga Flygkadettskolan) in 1967 and was commissioned as an officer with the rank of second lieutenant. He served as an A 32 attack fighter pilot at Skaraborg Wing (F 7). Harrskog was promoted to lieutenant in 1969 was transferred to the Defence Materiel Administration as a test pilot at the Swedish Center for Experimental Research (Försökscentralen) where he tested the Saab 37 Viggen. He completed the higher course at the Swedish Armed Forces Staff College from 1976 to 1978 and served at the Defence Staff from 1978 to 1981. In 1981 Harrskog took office as a flight commander during the introduction of the AJ 37 ground-attack fighter at Bråvalla Wing (F 13). In 1983 Harrskog left F 13 and served at the Air Staff's Planning Department until 1985. He was then head of the same department from 1985 to 1987. Harrskog studied at the Air War College in the United States from 1987 to 1988 and at the Swedish National Defence College. On 1 October 1988, Harrskog was promoted to colonel and was appointed acting sector wing commander for the Norrbotten Wing (F 21/Se ÖN). On 1 April 1990 he was promoted to senior colonel and became head of the Air Staff's Program Management. In 1991, Harrskog attended the Swedish National Defence College.

On 1 January 1992, Harrskog became the commander of the Norrbotten Wing (F21/SeÖN). In 1994 he became the Chief of Air Force Command. On 1 July 1998, Harrskog assumed the position of military commander of the Southern Military District (Milo S). In 2000, Harrskog left the Swedish Armed Forces, and until 2005, he was a military expert at the Ministry of Defence. He was appointed in 2005 as chairman of the first MOU committee appointed to work towards Saudi Arabia which meant that Saab could sell the radar system Erieye. From there he went directly to Saab International in 2006 and worked as an adviser for the export of the Saab JAS 39 Gripen. He sat on the board of the Civil Aviation Administration from 1994 to 1999.

== Personal life ==
Harrskog was married to Rose-Marie Harrskog (born 1947), and to Inger Amft Harrskog (born 1943). He married for the third time in 1986, to Inger Sterling Harrskog (Note: Also called Inger Tilert.) (born 1951). Harrskog has four children.

He is Grand Prior the President of the Governing Council av Order of Saint Lazarus.

== Awards and decorations ==
- Grand Decoration of Honour in Gold for Services to the Republic of Austria (2003)

== Honours ==
- Member of the Royal Swedish Academy of War Sciences (1987)

== Dates of rank ==
- 1967 – Second lieutenant
- 1969 – Lieutenant
- 1972 – Captain
- 1978 – Major
- 1983 – Lieutenant colonel
- 1985 – Överstelöjtnant med särskild tjänsteställning
- 1 October 1988 – Colonel
- 1 April 1990 – Senior colonel
- 1994 – Lieutenant general

== Footnotes ==
Military offices
Preceded by Roland Magndahl	Norrbotten Wing; 1991–1993	Succeeded by Curt Westberg
Preceded by None	Northern Air Command; 1993–1994	Succeeded by Gunnar Ståhl
Preceded by Lars-Erik Englund	Chief of Air Force Command; 1994–1998	Succeeded by Jan Jonsson
Preceded by Sven-Åke Jansson	Southern Military District; 1998–2000	Succeeded by None
