= Mertil Melin =

Swedish Army officer

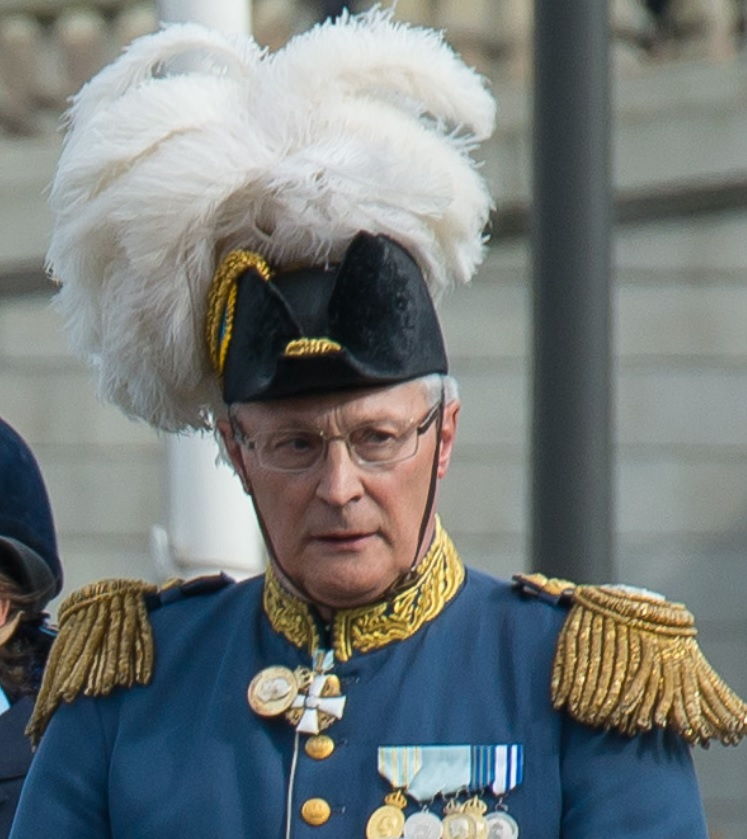
- Melin as Crown Equerry in 2015.
- Born: Mertil Börje Melin; 17 July 1945; Stånga, Sweden
- Died: 20 October 2023 (aged 78); Stockholm, Sweden
- Military career
- Allegiance: Sweden
- Branch: Swedish Army
- Service years: 1968–2000
- Rank: Lieutenant General
- Commands: Norrland Dragoon Regiment; Chief of Army Command; Northern Military District; Chairman of the European Union Military Committee
- Other work: Crown Equerry

Lieutenant General Mertil Börje Melin (17 July 1945 – 20 October 2023) was a Swedish Army officer. Born in Stånga, Sweden, in 1945, Melin developed an early passion for horses, which continued during his military service at Norrland Dragoons in Umeå. He graduated from the Military Academy Karlberg in 1968, embarking on a distinguished military career. He excelled in various officer training programs, becoming a lieutenant general and serving as the Chief of Army Command. His achievements include being the youngest colonel and regimental commander in Sweden at age 43. Melin also represented Sweden in the European Union and NATO military committees. Later in life, he served as the Crown Equerry of the Royal Court of Sweden from 2003 to 2015.

== Early life ==
Melin was born on 17 July 1945 in Stånga, Sweden, the son of Sven Erik Olof Melin (1909–1987) and Dagny Gertrud Emilia Ulmstedt (1913–2004). His interest in horses started in the mid-1950s at the farm in Stånga where his neighbor had three Ardennais and a Gotland pony. He left Gotland and the farm in Stånga in 1963 to do his military conscription at the cavalry regiment Norrland Dragoons (K 4) in Umeå. Melin's interest in horses came in handy there too as the regiment had 400 horses in its stable. He then attended the Swedish Armed Forces School for Secondary Education from which he graduated in 1967.

== Career ==
Melin graduated from the Military Academy Karlberg in 1968 and was commissioned as an officer with the rank of second lieutenant the same year. Melin served in Norrland Dragoons (K 4) in Umeå from 1968 to 1979. Melin attended the Infantry and Cavalry Officer School from 1970 to 1971 and was promoted to captain in 1972. He completed Ranger School at Fort Benning in Georgia in 1977, the first Swedish officer to do that. After that he did the Higher Staff Course at the Military Academy Karlberg from 1977 to 1979. Melin was a major in the Defence Staff in 1979 and the General Staff Corps in 1981 and was section head at Gotland Military Command from 1982 to 1987. He was also adjutant of His Majesty the King from 1980 to 1988.

Melin was appointed lieutenant colonel in 1984 and was the battalion commander at Norrland Dragoon Regiment (K 4) from 1987 to 1989. He was promoted to colonel and appointed commander of Norrland Dragoon Regiment (K 4) 1 July 1989. At the age of 43, he was Sweden's youngest colonel and regimental commander. On 4 June 1992, Melin was promoted to senior colonel, and assumed the position as head of operation at the Northern Military District (Milo N) in Boden, serving until 1995. Melin was promoted to major general and was deputy Chief of Army Command at Swedish Armed Forces Headquarters from 1995 to 1996. On 1 April 1996, Melin was promoted to lieutenant general and was appointed Chief of Army Command. He was after that military commander of the Northern Military District from 1998 to 2000 and the Sweden's member of the European Union Military Committee and the NATO military committee for partner countries based at Sweden's permanent representation to the EU in Brussels. The military committee was started during Sweden's EU presidency in 2001, and Melin served for a short time as the Chairman of the European Union Military Committee.

Melin served as Crown Equerry of the Royal Court of Sweden from 1 April 2003 to 2015.

== Personal life ==
In 1968, Melin married Gurli Margaretha Åberg (born 1944 in Umeå), the daughter of Stig and Gurli Åberg. He is the father of Stig Magnus (born 1969 in Umeå) and Anna Margareta (born 1976 in Umeå).

== Death ==
Melin died on 20 October 2023 in Hedvig Eleonora Parish in Stockholm, Sweden. On 24 November 2023, the funeral service was held in the Royal Chapel in Stockholm.

== Dates of rank ==
- 1968 – Second lieutenant
- 19?? – Lieutenant
- 1972 – Captain
- 1979 – Major
- 1984 – Lieutenant colonel
- 1 July 1989 – Colonel
- 4 June 1992 – Senior colonel
- 15 October 1995 – Major general
- 1 April 1996 – Lieutenant general

== Awards and decorations ==
=== Swedish ===
- (Sweden) 12th size gold medal worn around the neck on a chain of gold (silver-gilt)
- (Sweden) H. M. The King's Medal, 12th size gold (silver-gilt) medal worn around the neck on the Order of the Seraphim ribbon (2009)
- (Sweden) H. M. The King's Medal, 8th size gold (silver-gilt) medal worn on the chest suspended by the Order of the Seraphim ribbon (1987)
- (Sweden) King Carl XVI Gustaf's Jubilee Commemorative Medal II (23 August 2013)
- (Sweden) Home Guard Medal of Merit in Gold
- (Sweden) Northern Military District Commemorative Medal
- (Sweden) 7th Class of the Order of Innocence
- etc

=== Foreign ===
- Commander 1st Class of the Order of the White Rose of Finland
- Knight Commander's Cross of the Order of Merit of the Federal Republic of Germany
- (Estonia) 2nd Class of the Order of the Cross of the Eagle (12 January 2011)
- etc

== Honours ==
- Member of the Royal Swedish Academy of War Sciences (1995)
- Grand Master of the Order of Innocence
- Board member of the Association for the Mounted Royal Guards (Föreningen för den Beridna Högvakten)
- Honorary member of the Cavalry and Ranger Officers Association (Kavalleri- och Jägarbefälsföreningen)

Military offices
Preceded by Björn Viktor Emil Lundquist	Norrland Dragoon Regiment; 1989–1992	Succeeded by Johan Kihl
Preceded by Åke Sagrén	Chief of Army Command; 1996–1998	Succeeded by Paul Degerlund
Preceded by Lars G. Persson	Northern Military District; 1998–2000	Succeeded by None
Preceded by None	Chairman of the European Union Military Committee; 2001–2001	Succeeded by Gustav Hägglund
Court offices
Preceded by Jörn Beckmann	Crown Equerry; 2003–2015	Succeeded by Ulf Gunnehed
