= Swedish Ice Hockey Association =

National IIHF member association for Sweden

Sweden
- Association name: Swedish Ice Hockey Association
- IIHF Code: SWE
- Founded: 17 November 1922
- IIHF membership: 23 March 1912
- President: Anders Larsson
- IIHF men's ranking: 4th (2020)
- IIHF women's ranking: 9th (2020)

The Swedish Ice Hockey Association (Swedish: Svenska Ishockeyförbundet (SIF)) in Swedish, is an association of Swedish ice hockey clubs. It was established in Stockholm on 17 November 1922 by representatives from seven clubs. Before then, organized ice hockey in Sweden had been administered by the Swedish Football Association. In 1920, Sweden became a member of the International Ice Hockey Federation (IIHF). In addition to ice hockey, SIF is also responsible for inline hockey.

The association's general secretary is Tommy Boustedt.

== Leagues and levels ==
The Swedish Ice Hockey Association is involved in all levels of ice hockey in Sweden. It organizes the two Swedish Championship leagues, the men's Swedish Hockey League (SHL) and Swedish Women's Hockey League (SDHL), in addition to other national, regional, and district leagues and tournaments.

Men's National

- Swedish Hockey League (SHL)
- HockeyAllsvenskan
- Hockeyettan (previously called Division 1)
- J20 SuperElit (also called J20 Nationell)
- J18 Allsvenskan ('Under-18 All-Swede')
- U16 SM-slutspel (Under-16 Swedish Championship Playoff')

Women's National

- Swedish Women's Hockey League (SDHL)

Men's Regional

- Hockeytvåan
- HockeyTrean
- J18 Elit
- J16 Elit

Women's Regional

- Damettan
- DamTvåan

Regional Districts

Region Syd	Region Väst	Region Öst	Region Norr
Blekinge	Dalarna	Gotland	Jämtland/Härjedalen
Bohuslän/Dal	Gästrikland	Stockholm	Medelpad
Gothenburg	Hälsingland	Södermanland	Norrbotten
Skåne	Värmland	Uppland	Västerbotten
Småland	Västmanland		Ångermanland
Västergötland	Örebro län		
Östergötland			

== National teams ==
Sweden has eight national hockey teams:

- Men's National Team - Tre Kronor
- Women's National Team - Damkronorna
- Men's National U20 - Juniorkronorna (also called Team 20)
- Men's National U19 – Team 19
- Men's National U18 - Småkronorna (also called Team 18)
- Women's National Under-18 Team – Damlandslaget U18
- Men's National U17 – Team 17
- Women National U16 – Damlandslaget U16
- Men's National U16 – Team 16
- Men's National Inline Team

== Chairmen ==
The following have served as chairman.

- 1922–1924: Isaac Westergren
- 1924–1948: Anton Johanson
- 1948–1973: Helge Berglund
- 1973–1978: Ove Rainer
- 1978–1983: Arne Grunander
- 1983–2002: Rickard Fagerlund
- 2002–2004: Kjell Nilsson
- 2004–2017: Christer Englund
- 2017–: Anders Larsson

== See also ==
- List of ice hockey players awarded Stora Grabbars och Tjejers Märke

== Bibliography ==
- "GENERAL INFORMATION ABOUT SWEDISH ICE HOCKEY" (PDF). The Swedish Ice Hockey Association. Archived from the original (PDF) on 7 September 2006.
