= Dick Börjesson =

Swedish Navy officer

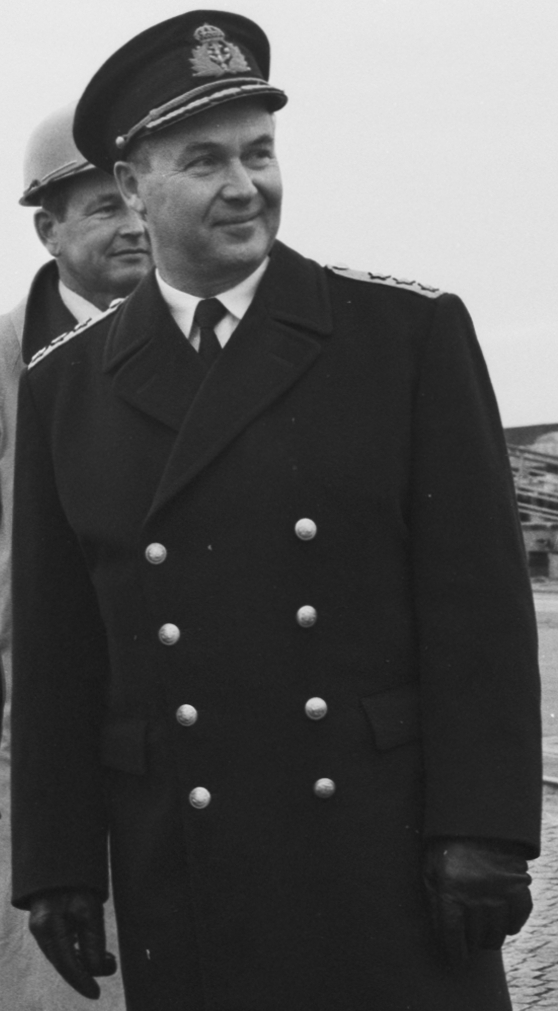
- Börjesson in 1991.
- Born: Dick Roland Börjesson; 16 July 1938 (age 88); Strömstad, Sweden
- Military career
- Allegiance: Sweden
- Branch: Swedish Navy
- Service years: 1961–1998
- Rank: Vice Admiral
- Commands: 6th Mine Clearance Department; Section 1, Naval Staff; Section Chief, Defence Staff; Chief of the Navy; Middle Military District; Commandant General in Stockholm

Vice Admiral Dick Roland Börjesson (born 16 July 1938) is a former officer of the Swedish Navy. He was Chief of the Navy from 1990 to 1994 and military commander of the Middle Military District (Milo M) from 1994 to 1998.

== Early life ==
Börjesson was born on 16 July 1938 in Strömstad, Sweden, the son of Arvid Börjesson and his wife Viola (née Larsson).

== Career ==
=== Military career ===
Börjesson attended the Royal Swedish Naval Academy from 1958 to 1961, in the same class as future Rear Admiral Sten Swedlund. Börjesson finished first in his class at the graduation in 1961. He received a reward that was very rarely awarded, namely the Naval Academy's gold token and an honorary saber. He was commissioned as a naval officer with the rank of acting sub-lieutenant. Börjesson was promoted to sub-lieutenant in 1963 and from 1964 to 1965 he served aboard the cadet training vessel HSwMS Älvsnabben during her trip to South America, Central America and North America. Börjesson was promoted to lieutenant in 1968 and attended the Swedish Armed Forces Staff College from 1970 to 1972 when he was promoted to lieutenant commander.

Börjesson was promoted to commander on 1 February 1975 and was secretary in the 1978 Defense Committee from 1978 to 1982. Börjesson was commanding officer of the 6th Mine Clearance Department (6. minröjningsavdelningen, 6. mröjA) from 1982 to 1983 before being promoted to captain on 1 October 1983. He was head of Section 1 in the Naval Staff from 1983 to 1986 and in 1987 he completed the main course at the Swedish National Defence College and was promoted to senior captain on 1 April 1987. Börjesson was section chief in the Defence Staff from 1987 to 1989 and also in 1989 he completed the management course at the Swedish National Defence College and was promoted to rear admiral.

In the autumn of 1989, the Supreme Commander of the Swedish Armed Forces, General Bengt Gustafsson wanted to appoint Rear Admiral Peter Nordbeck as the new Chief of the Navy after Vice Admiral Bengt Schuback. Instead, the Minister of Defence, Roine Carlsson, appointed Börjesson, who was then a captain. Börjesson was then quickly promoted to rear admiral to become vice admiral and Chief of the Navy on 1 October 1990. He served four years as navy chief and on 1 July 1994 he became military commander of the Middle Military District (Milo M) and Commandant General in Stockholm. Börjesson left the position and retired in 1998.

=== Other work ===
Beside his military career, Börjesson was an expert in the Swedish Coast Guard Committee (Kustbevakningskommittén) and was a board member of the National Institute of Defence Organization and Management (Försvarets rationaliseringsinstitut), Försvarsmedia, the National Maritime Museum and the Swedish National Defence College. In 1999, Börjesson investigated the Swedish government's crisis work following the Estonia disaster. He proposed a crisis organization in the government office. The proposal was rejected.

== Personal life ==
In 1962 he married the Judge of Appeal Margareta Niklason (born 1939), the daughter of Oskar Niklason and Birgit (née Forsberg).

== Dates of rank ==
- 1961 – Acting sub-lieutenant
- 1963 – Sub-lieutenant
- 1968 – Lieutenant
- 1972 – Lieutenant commander
- 1 February 1975 – Commander
- 1 October 1983 – Captain
- 1 April 1987 – Senior captain
- 1989 – Rear admiral
- 1 October 1990 – Vice admiral

== Awards and decorations ==
- (Argentina) Grand Cross of the Order of May (4 June 1998)
- Grand Decoration of Honour in Silver with Sash for Services to the Republic of Austria (1997)
- (Estonia) 1st Class of the Order of the White Star (8 September 1995)

== Honours ==
- Member of the Royal Swedish Society of Naval Sciences (1979) (honorary member in 1990)
- Member of the Royal Swedish Academy of War Sciences (1986)

Military offices
Preceded by Bengt Schuback	Chief of the Navy; 1990–1994	Succeeded by Peter Nordbeck
Preceded by Torsten Engberg	Middle Military District; 1994–1998	Succeeded by Percurt Green
Preceded by Torsten Engberg	Commandant General in Stockholm; 1994–1998	Succeeded by Percurt Green
