= Percurt Green =

Swedish Army officer

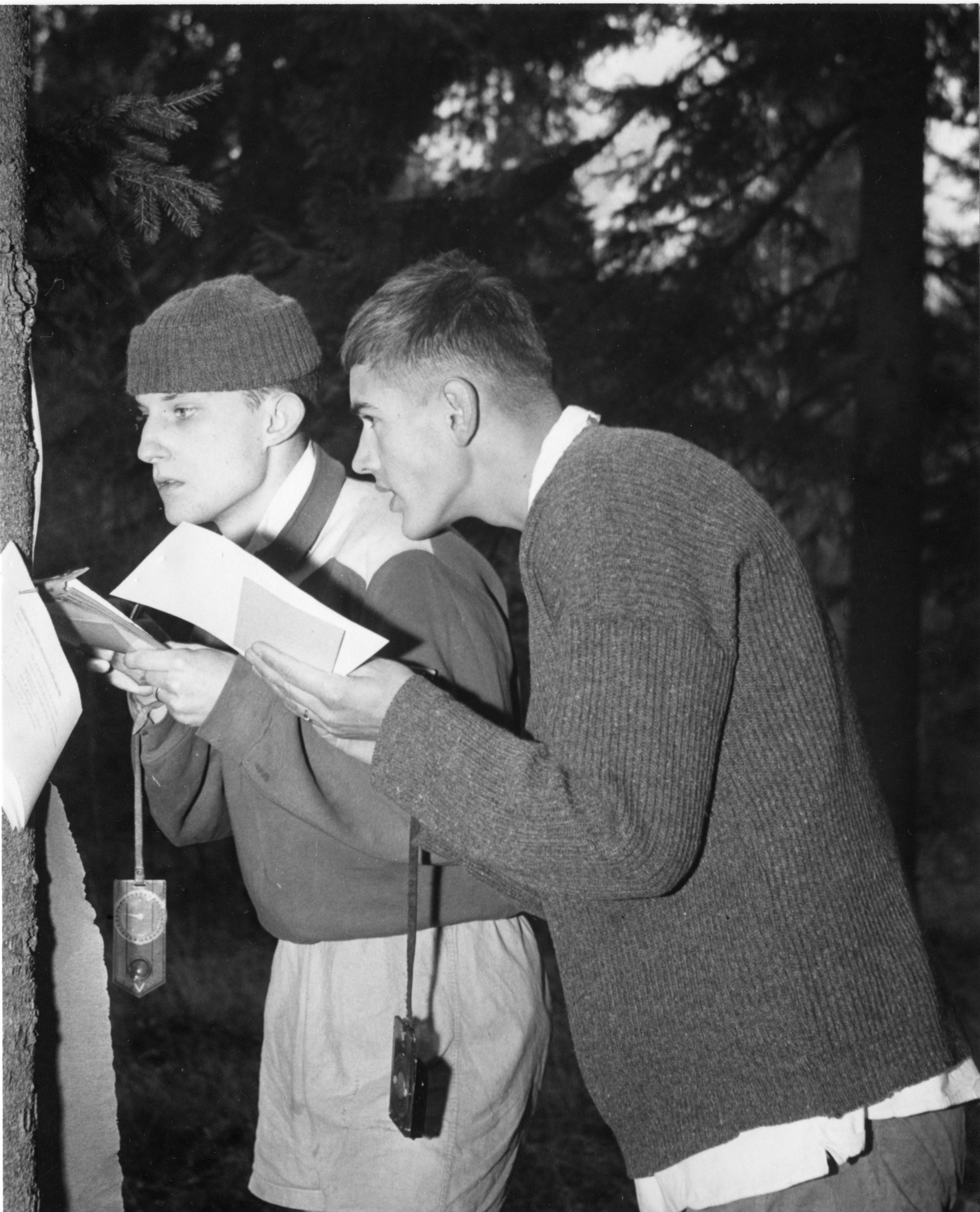
- Percurt Green (right) in 1958
- Born: Per Kurt Green; 2 December 1939; Karlstad, Sweden
- Died: 3 January 2025 (aged 85)
- Military career
- Allegiance: Sweden
- Branch: Swedish Army
- Service years: 1963–2000
- Rank: Lieutenant General
- Nickname: PCG
- Commands: Joint Operations Command; Dep. Supreme Commander; Middle Military District; Commandant General in Stockholm

Lieutenant General Per Kurt "Percurt" Green (born 2 December 1939) was a Swedish Army officer whose senior commands have included commanding officer of the Joint Operations Command, Deputy Supreme Commander and military commander of the Middle Military District, and Commandant General in Stockholm.

== Early life ==
Green was born on 2 December 1939 in Karlstad, Sweden, the son of Kurt Green and his wife Maj (née Karlmark).

== Career ==
Green was commissioned as an officer in 1963 and attended the Swedish Armed Forces Staff College from 1969 to 1971. Green attended the International Officer Class of the United States Army Command and General Staff College at Fort Leavenworth in the United States from 1977 to 1978. On 1 June 1983, Green was promoted to colonel and appointed deputy regimental commander of Älvsborg Regiment (I 15) in Borås. He attended the Swedish National Defence College in 1984 and the same year he was promoted to senior colonel and appointed chief of staff of Bergslagen Military District (Milo B). On 1 April 1986, Green assumed the position of section head in the Defence Staff. In November 1986, Green was appointed head of the Ministry of Defence's Budget and Planning Department. He served in this position until 1989.

Green also served as secretary in the 1988 Defence Committee (Försvarskommittén). He was promoted to major general on 1 April 1989 and was at the same time assigned to the Supreme Commander of the Swedish Armed Forces. In 1990, Green attended the Swedish National Defence College again. Green served as head of army materiel at the Swedish Defence Materiel Administration from 1 July 1990 to 1994. Green was promoted to lieutenant general on 1 July 1994 and assumed the position of Chief of the Joint Operations Command (Operationsledningen, OpL) at the Swedish Armed Forces Headquarters and Deputy Supreme Commander. From 1998 to 2000, Green served as military commander of the Middle Military District (Milo M) and Commandant General in Stockholm. He retired in 2000.

Green has served as board member of the Swedish Coast Guard, the Swedish National Defence Research Institute and the National Archives of Sweden. He was also CEO of Association of Swedish Defence Industries (Försvarsindustriföreningen). In January 2005, Green co-chaired the Nordic and Baltic Industrial Co-Operation Agreements in Helsinki, Finland.

== Personal life ==
In 1976, he married Britt Boilert (born 1939).

== Dates of rank ==
- 1963 – Second lieutenant
- 19?? – Lieutenant
- 19?? – Captain
- 1974 – Major
- 1979 – Lieutenant colonel
- 1 June 1983 – Colonel
- 1984 – Senior colonel
- 1 April 1989 – Major general
- 1994 – Lieutenant general

== Awards and decorations ==
- (Iceland) Grand Cross of the Order of the Falcon (24 November 1998)
- Grand Decoration of Honour in Silver with Star for Services to the Republic of Austria (1993)

== Honours ==
- Member of the Royal Swedish Academy of War Sciences (1980)
- Member of the International Hall of Fame, United States Army Command and General Staff College

Military offices
Preceded by Peter Nordbeck	Joint Operations Command (Operationsledningen); 1994–1998	Succeeded by Kjell Nilsson
Preceded by None	Deputy Supreme Commander; 1994–1998	Succeeded by Frank Rosenius
Preceded by Dick Börjesson	Middle Military District; 1998–2000	Succeeded by None
Preceded by Dick Börjesson	Commandant General in Stockholm; 1998–2000	Succeeded by Kjell Koserius
