= Norrbotten Wing =

- Norrbottens flygflottilj
- Active: 1941–present
- Country: Sweden
- Allegiance: Swedish Armed Forces
- Branch: Swedish Air Force
- Type: Wing
- Role: Recon wing (1949–1961); Fighter & recon wing (1961–2002); Fighter wing (2002–present)
- Garrison/HQ: Luleå
- March: "Stratos" (Råberg) (Note: The march was adopted and established on 22 January 1985.)

Commanders
- Current commander: COL Peter Greberg

Insignia
- Roundels

Aircraft flown
- Attack: ~~Sk 60B~~
- Bomber: ~~B 4~~, ~~B 5~~, ~~B 17~~
- Electronic warfare: ~~Sk 37E~~
- Fighter: ~~J 32B~~, ~~J 35D~~, ~~JA 37~~, ~~AJSF 37~~, ~~AJSH 37~~, ~~JAS 39A~~, JAS 39C
- Multirole helicopter: ~~Hkp 3B~~, ~~Hkp 4A~~, ~~HKP 10A~~
- Reconnaissance: ~~S 9~~, ~~S 14~~, ~~S 18A~~, ~~S 26~~, ~~S 29C~~, ~~S 35E~~, ~~SF 37~~, ~~SH 37~~
- Transport: ~~Tp 4~~, ~~Tp 83~~, ~~TP 87~~, ~~TP 101~~
- ~~G 101~~, ~~Se 102~~, ~~Se 103~~, ~~Se 104~~, ~~Sk 11~~, ~~Sk 12~~, ~~Sk 14~~, ~~Sk 15~~, ~~Sk 16~~, ~~Sk 50~~, ~~T 18B~~

Norrbotten Wing (Swedish: Norrbottens flygflottilj), also F 21 Luleå, or simply F 21, is a Swedish Air Force wing with the main base located in Luleå Airport in northern Sweden. It is one of the three remaining wings in Sweden and currently has two squadrons of multirole aircraft. F 21 in the north and F 17 in the south are the two wings remaining to have operational squadrons. F 7 is a school where pilots begin their training in the JAS 39 Gripen. Once completed the pilot's training is moved out to the two operational wings where they acquire their final training.

== History ==
Parts of the Swedish helicopter forces are today stationed at F 21 with MEDEVAC in subarctic climate as its main task. The wing uses the coat of arms of Luleå as the emblem. F 21 currently operates two HKP 10B in Afghanistan.

F 21 figures in the crime novel The Red Wolf by Liza Marklund.

Current fleet:

- JAS 39 Gripen
- NHIndustries NH90 (HKP 14)

== Heraldry and traditions ==
=== Coat of arms ===
The unit's first coat of arms, used by the Royal Norrbotten Air Base Corps was used from 1941 to 1963. Blazon: "Azure, powdered with estoiles or, the provincial badge of Västerbotten, a reindeer courant argent, armed and langued gules". The unit's second coat of arms, used by Norrbotten Wing, was used from 1963 to 1994. Blazon: "Argent, the town badge of Luleå, two keys azure in saltire, sinister inverted." The current coat of arms has been used since 1994. Blazon: "Argent, the town badge of Luleå, two keys azure in saltire, sinister inverted, a chief azure charged with a winged two-bladed propeller or".

Coat of arms used from 1941 to 1963.

Coat of arms used from 1963 to 1994.

Coat of arms used from 1994.

=== Colours, standards and guidons ===
The colour was presented to the then Royal Norrbotten Air Base Corps (F 21) at Barkarby by His Majesty the King Gustaf V on 17 September 1944. The colour is drawn by Brita Grep and embroidered by hand in insertion technique by the company Libraria. Blazon: "On blue cloth in the centre the badge of the Air Force; a winged two-bladed propeller under a royal crown proper, all in yellow. In the first corner the town badge of Luleå; two white keys in saltire, the left inverted." On 2 September 2014 His Majesty the King Carl XVI Gustaf presented a new colour to wing commander colonel Fredrik Bergman. As a tradition-bearing unit of previously disbanded wings, the new colour added traditional heritage from Jämtland Wing (F 4) and Hälsinge Wing (F 15) in the form of each county's coat of arms. The town badge of Luleå, two white keys in saltire can also be found in the new colour.

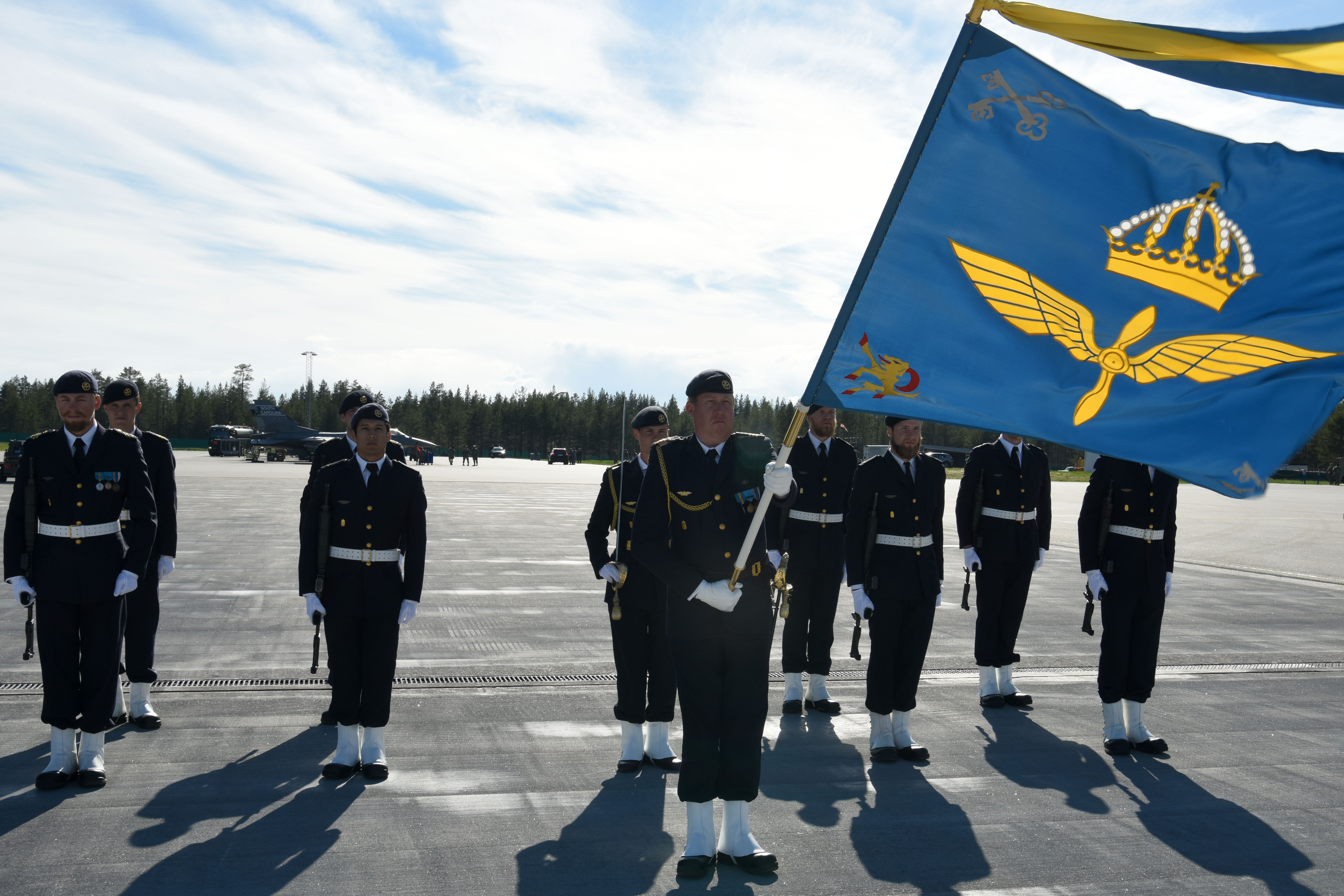
Honor guard with the wing's colour

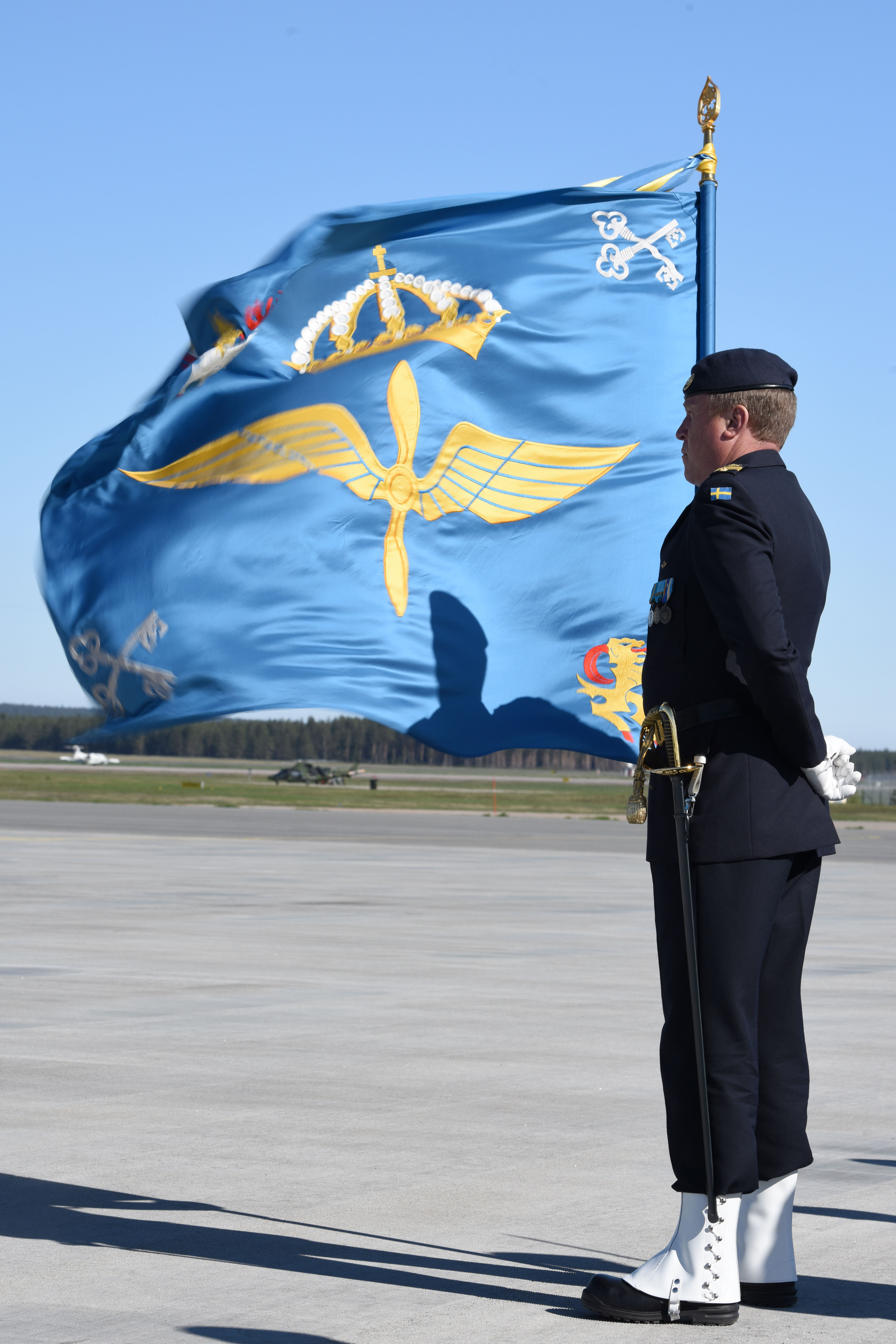
Honor guard with the wing's colour

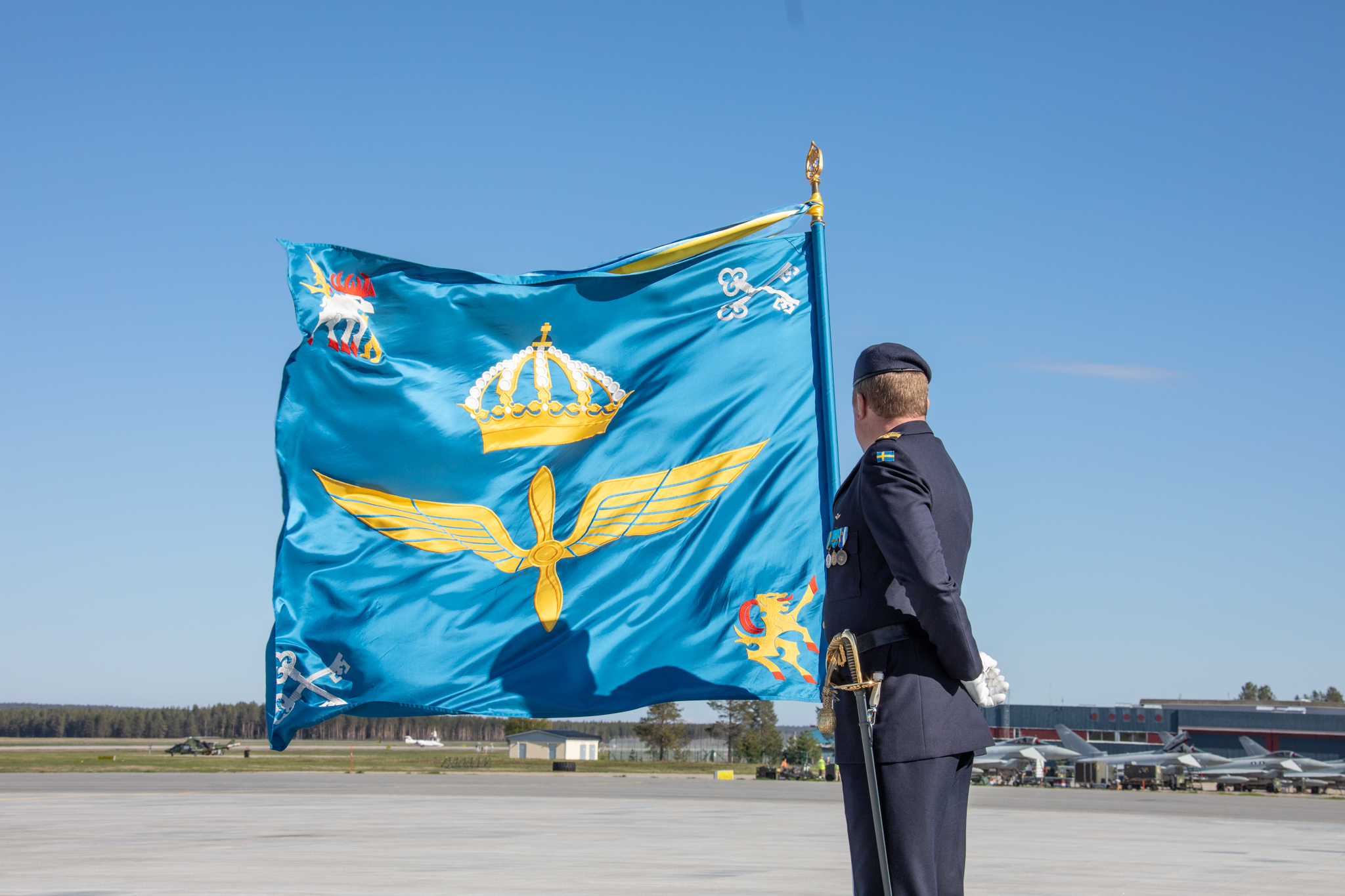
Honor guard with the wing's colour

=== Medals ===
In 1996, the Norrbottens flygflottiljs (F 21) förtjänstmedalj ("Norrbotten Wing (F 21) Medal of Merit") in gold (NorrbffljGM) of the 8th size was established. The medal ribbon is blue with red edges and a yellow stripe on the middle.

Ribbon bar of the medal of merit.

== Commanding officers ==
From 1941 to 1963, the commanding officers was referred to as kårchef ("corps commander") and had the rank of lieutenant colonel. From 1942, the corps commander had the rank of colonel. From 1942 to 1957, the commanding officer of F 21 was also commanding officer of Upper Norrland Air Defence District (Flybo ÖN). When the wing organization was introduced in 1963, the commanding officer was referred to as flottiljchef ("wing commander"), and had the rank of colonel. From 1976 to 1994, the wing commander was referred to as sektorflottiljchef ("sector wing commander") and had the rank of senior colonel. From 1 July 1994, the commanding officer is again referred to as flottiljchef ("wing commander"), and has the rank of colonel.

=== Corps, wing and sector wing commanders ===
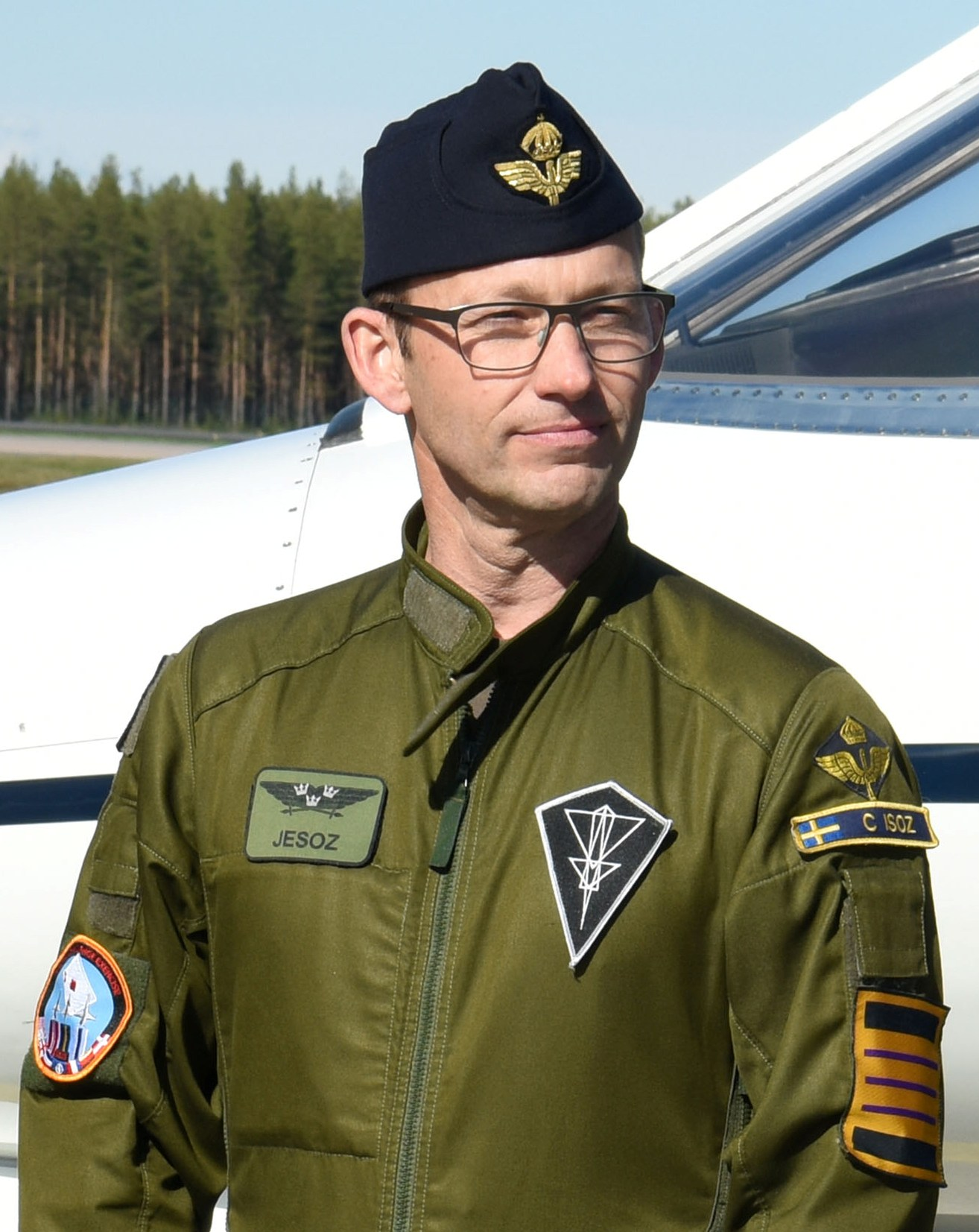
Colonel Claes Isoz as wing commander in 2019.

- 1941–1942: Fredrik Adilz
- 1942–1946: Gösta von Porat
- 1946–1951: Lars-Erik Tornberg
- 1951–1957: Hugo Svenow
- 1957–1959: Gunnar Lindberg
- 1959–1965: Bengt Bellander
- 1965–1966: Jan Oterdahl
- 1966–1969: Tord Norlin
- 1969–1976: Rune Larsson
- 1976–1980: Hans Hansson
- 1980–1982: Lars-Bertil Persson
- 1982–1984: Bert Stenfeldt
- 1984–1987: Carl-Johan Rundberg
- 1987–1991: Roland Magndahl
- 1 January 1992 – 1993: Senior Colonel Kent Harrskog
- 1993–1994: Curt Westberg
- 1994–1998: Roland Sterner
- 1998–2001: Frank Fredriksson
- 2002–2005: Jan Otterström
- 2005–2008: Lars Jäderblom
- 2008–2011: Per Nilsson
- 2011–2015: Fredrik Bergman
- 2015–2018: Carl-Johan Edström
- 2018–2021: Claes Isoz
- 2021–2023: Carl-Fredrik Edström
- 2023–20xx: Peter Greberg

=== Deputy sector wing commanders ===
In order to relieve the sector wing commander, a deputy sector wing commander position was added in 1975. Its task was to lead the unit procurement, a task largely similar to the old wing commander position. Hence he was also referred to as flottiljchef ("wing commander"). The deputy sector wing commander had the rank of colonel. On 30 June 1993, the deputy sector wing commander position was terminated.

- 1975–1976: Hans Hansson
- 1977–1979: Bror Larsson
- 1980–1984: Carl-Johan Rundberg
- 1984–1988: Karl-Göte Widén
- 1988–1990: Kent Harrskog
- 1990–1993: ?

== Names, designations and locations ==
Name	Translation	From		To
Kungl. Norrbottens flygbaskår	Royal Norrbotten Air Base Corps	1941-07-01	–	1963-06-30
Kungl. Norrbottens flygflottilj	Royal Norrbotten Wing	1963-07-01	–	1974-12-31
Norrbottens flygflottilj	Norrbotten Wing; Norrbotten Air Group	1975-01-01	–	
Designation		From		To
F 21		1941-07-01	–	1957-09-30
F 21/Se ÖN1		1957-10-01	–	1965-??-??
F 21/Se ÖN3		1957-10-01	–	1981-??-??
F 21/Se ÖN		1981-??-??	–	1993-06-30
F 21/FK N		1993-07-01	–	1994-06-30
F 21		1994-07-01	–	
Location		From		To
Luleå Airport		1941-07-01	–	
