= Arne Grunander =

Swedish ice hockey executive

- Born: 28 January 1918; Stockholm, Sweden
- Died: 13 February 1987 (aged 69); Hässelby, Sweden
- Known for: President of the Swedish Ice Hockey Association
- Honours: IIHF Hall of Fame

Arne Grunander (28 January 1918 – 13 February 1987) was a Swedish ice hockey executive. He helped lead Djurgårdens IF Hockey to nine championships and served as president of the Swedish Ice Hockey Association from 1978 to 1983. He was inducted into the IIHF Hall of Fame posthumously in 1997.

== Career ==
As a youth, Grunander played football alongside Birger Sandberg, where he helped his school win the Crown Prince's trophy in 1937.

In 1948, Grunander took over as chairman of Djurgårdens IF Hockey and in his first year with the team helped them qualify for the then-highest league, Allsvenskan. From the 1948 season onwards, Djurgården won nine Swedish championships between 1950 and 1963. As Grunander saw his team dominating the league, he was one of the first instigators that argued for a new elite series of Swedish hockey. Although the proposal was first shot down, by 1974 the Swedish Hockey Association eventually decided to create the Swedish Elite League. At Djurgården's 75th anniversary, Grunander was awarded a merit award from Djurgårdens IF, the overarching sports club of all departments. Later in his career, Grunander helped recruit players from IK Göta to play for Djurgården, including Ove Malmberg who described him as a charismatic leader and hockey expert.

Grunander also served as a council member of the Swedish Ice Hockey Association from 1968 to 1978 before being elected President in 1978.

Although he died on 13 February 1987, Grunander was inducted posthumously into the IIHF Hall of Fame as a builder in 1997.

== Personal life ==
Grunander also worked in financial law off the ice and briefly as the IIHF auditor.
