= Northern Military District (Milo N) =

- Norra militärområdet
- Active: 1993–2000
- Country: Sweden
- Allegiance: Swedish Armed Forces
- Branch: Joint service
- Type: Military district
- Role: Operational, territorial and tactical operations
- Garrison/HQ: Boden
- Colors: Blue and white
- March: "Norrlandsfärger" (Widkvist) (Note: The march was adopted in 1994 and established on 13 June 1996. It was used by the Northern Military District from 2000 to 2005.)

Northern Military District (Swedish: Norra militärområdet, Milo N) was a Swedish military district, a command of the Swedish Armed Forces that had operational control over Northern Sweden, for most time of its existence corresponding to the area covered by the counties of Västernorrland, Jämtland, Västerbotten and Norrbotten. The headquarters of Milo N were located in Boden.

== History ==
The Northern Military District (Milo N) was created in 1993 when the number of military districts of Sweden was decreased to three, and as a consequence of that, the Upper Norrland Military District (Milo ÖN) was merged with the Lower Norrland Military District (Milo NN), except Gävleborg County, to create this new military district. In 2000, these last three military districts were disbanded and the command for the whole of Sweden was placed at the Swedish Armed Forces Headquarters, in accordance with the Defence Act of 2000.

== Heraldry and traditions ==
=== Coat of arms ===
The coat of arms of the Northern Military District Staff 1994–2000. It was also used by the Northern Military District Staff (MD N) 2000–2005 and the Northern Military Region (MR N) 2018–present. Blazon: "Azure, the provincial badge of Västerbotten, a reindeer courant, armed gules, followed by a mullet, both argent. The shield surmounted an erect sword or."

=== Medals ===
In 2000, the Norra militärområdesstabens (MilostabN) minnesmedalj ("Northern Military District Staff (MilostabN) Commemorative Medal") in silver (MiloN SMM) of the 8th size was established. The medal is oval in shape and the medal ribbon is of white moiré with blue edges and a blue stripe on each side.

Medal ribbon

== Commanding officers ==
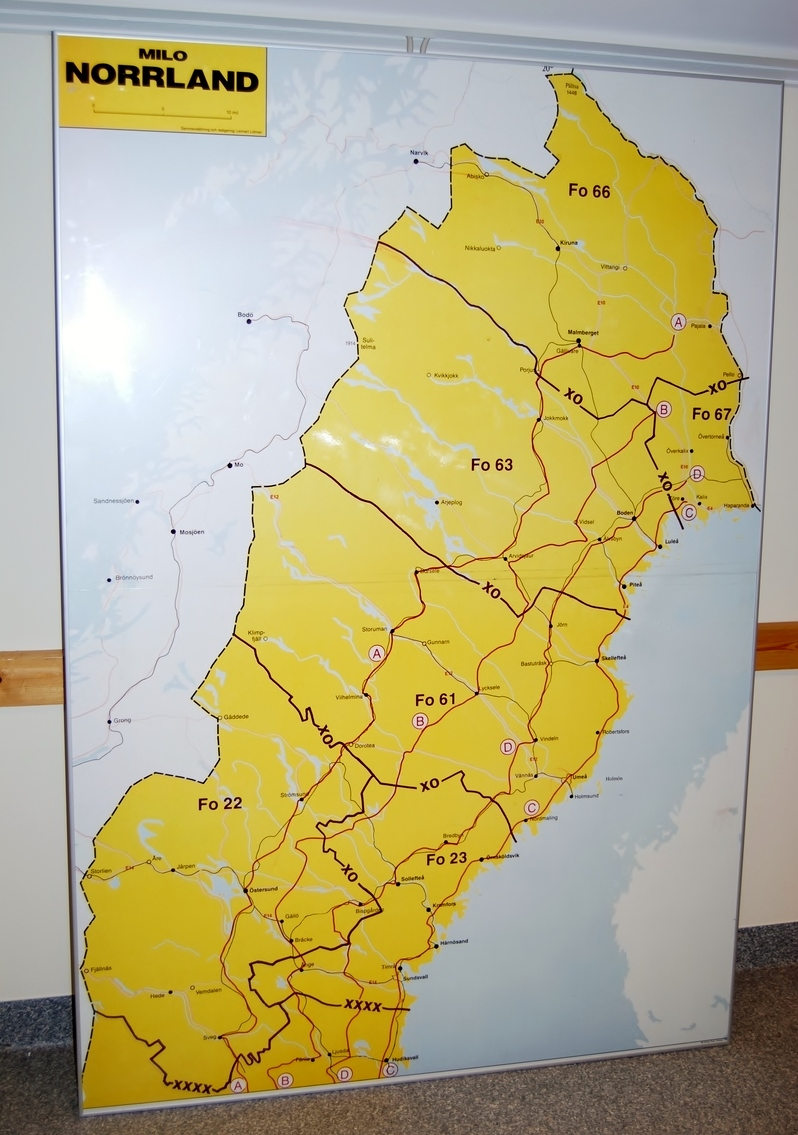
Map of the Northern Military District.

=== Military commanders ===
- 1993–1996: Curt Sjöö
- 1996–1998: Lars G. Persson
- 1998–2000: Mertil Melin

=== Chiefs of Staff ===
- 1993–1995: Tomas Warming
- 1995–1996: Folke Rehnström
- 1996–1996: Lars G. Persson
- 1996–1998: Kjell Nilsson
- 1998–2000: Lars Frisk

== Names, designations and locations ==
Name	Translation	From		To
Norra militärområdet	Northern Military District	1993-07-01	–	2000-06-30
Avvecklingsorganisation	Decommissioning Organisation	2000-07-01	–	2001-03-31
Designation		From		To
Milo N		1993-07-01	–	2000-06-30
Location		From		To
Boden Garrison		1993-07-01	–	2001-03-31

== See also ==
- Military district (Sweden)
