= Generallöjtnant =

Swedish military rank

Lieutenant General generallöjtnant
- Country: Sweden
- Service branch: Army; Air Force; Amphibious Corps (from 2000); Coastal Artillery (until 2000)
- Abbreviation: Genlt (Swedish), LtGen (English)
- Rank: Three-star (Note: Lieutenant general was a two-star rank until 1972 and general was the three-star rank in the Swedish Armed Forces rank structure.)
- NATO rank code: OF-8
- Non-NATO rank: O-9
- Next higher rank: General
- Next lower rank: Major general
- Equivalent ranks: Vice admiral

Lieutenant General (LtGen) (Swedish: generallöjtnant, genlt) is a three-star commissioned officer rank in the Swedish Army, Swedish Air Force and Swedish Amphibious Corps. Lieutenant general ranks immediately above major general and below a general. The rank is equivalent to vice admiral in the Swedish Navy.

== History ==
The lieutenant general was originally the general's deputy (locum tenens) or closest man. The lieutenant general was usually the commander of a division.

Historically, during the 20th century, lieutenant generals were promoted one grade upon retirement to full four-star general.

Following a proposal from the Swedish Armed Forces, the Government of Sweden decides on employment as a general of any rank.

In everyday speech, generals of all ranks are addressed as generals.

== Rank insignia ==
=== Collar patches ===
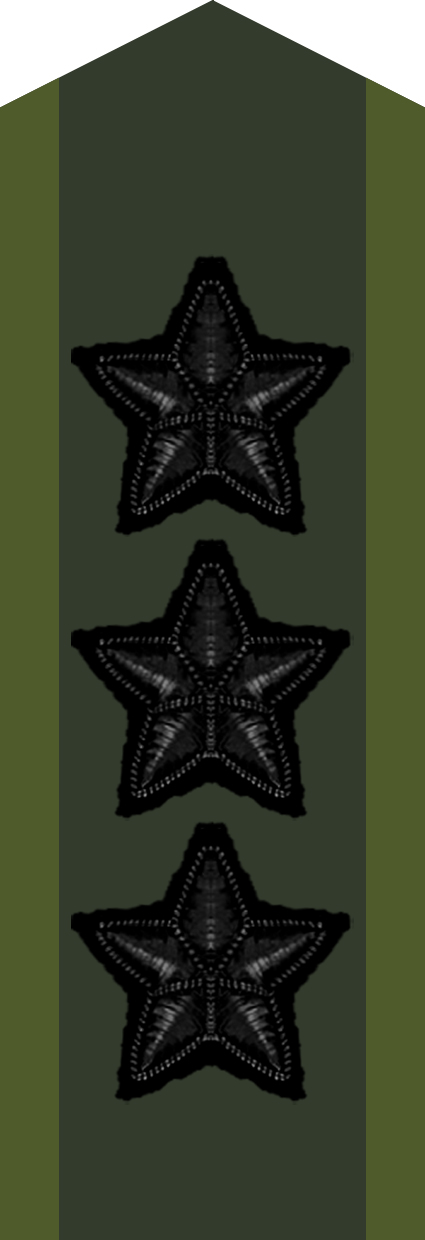
Collar patch m/58 (black m/02) on field uniform M90
(2002–present)

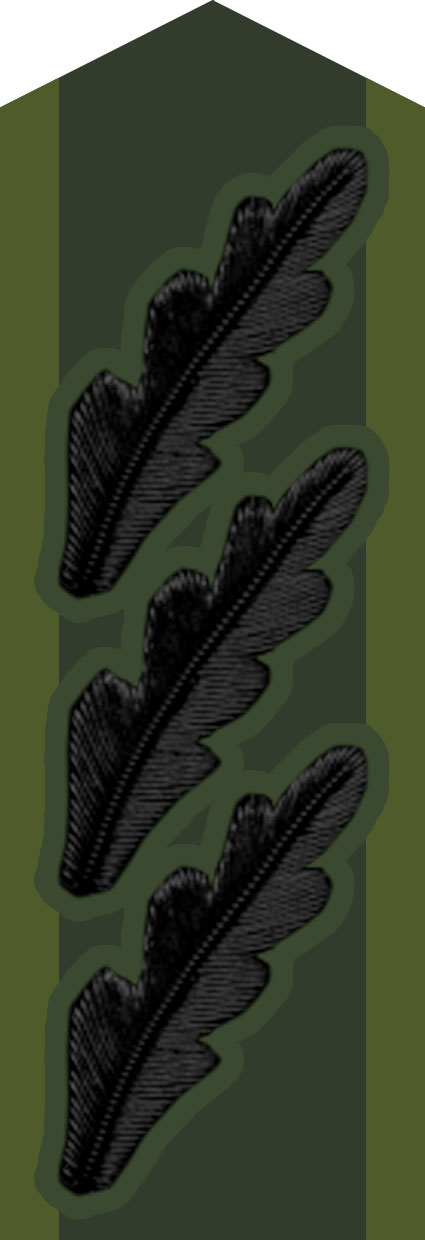
Collar patch m/58 (black m/02) on field uniform M90
(2002–present)

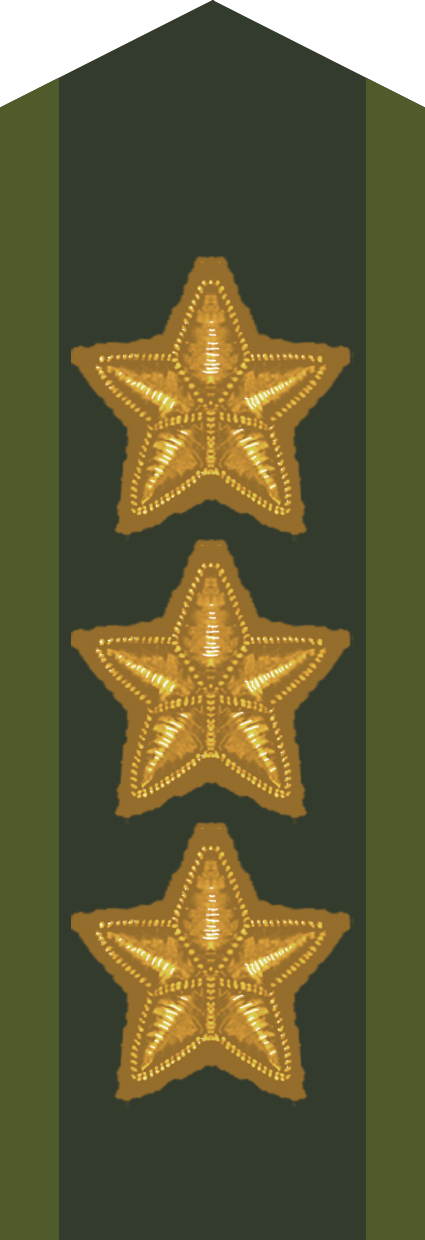
Collar patch m/58 (gold) on uniform m/58-m/59 and field uniform M90
(1983–2002)

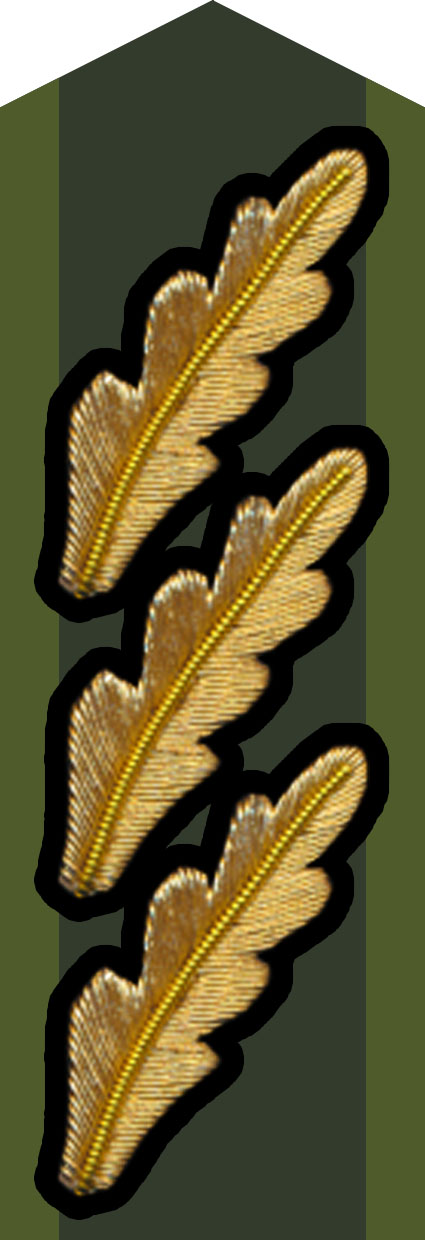
Collar patch m/58 (gold) on uniform m/58-m/59 and field uniform M90
(–2002)

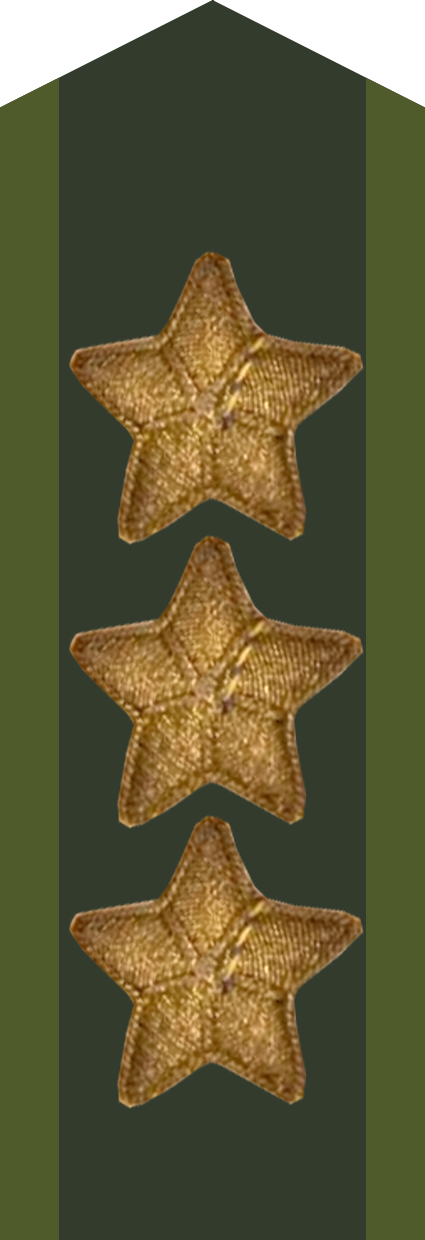
Collar patch m/58 (bronze) on uniform m/58-m/59
(1972–1983)

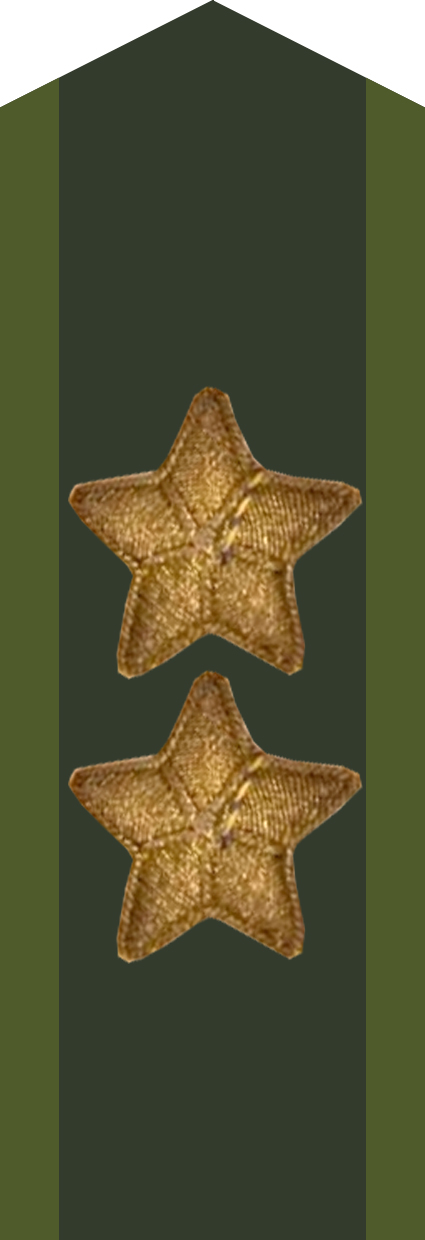
Collar patch m/58 (bronze) on uniform m/58-m/59
(1958–1972)

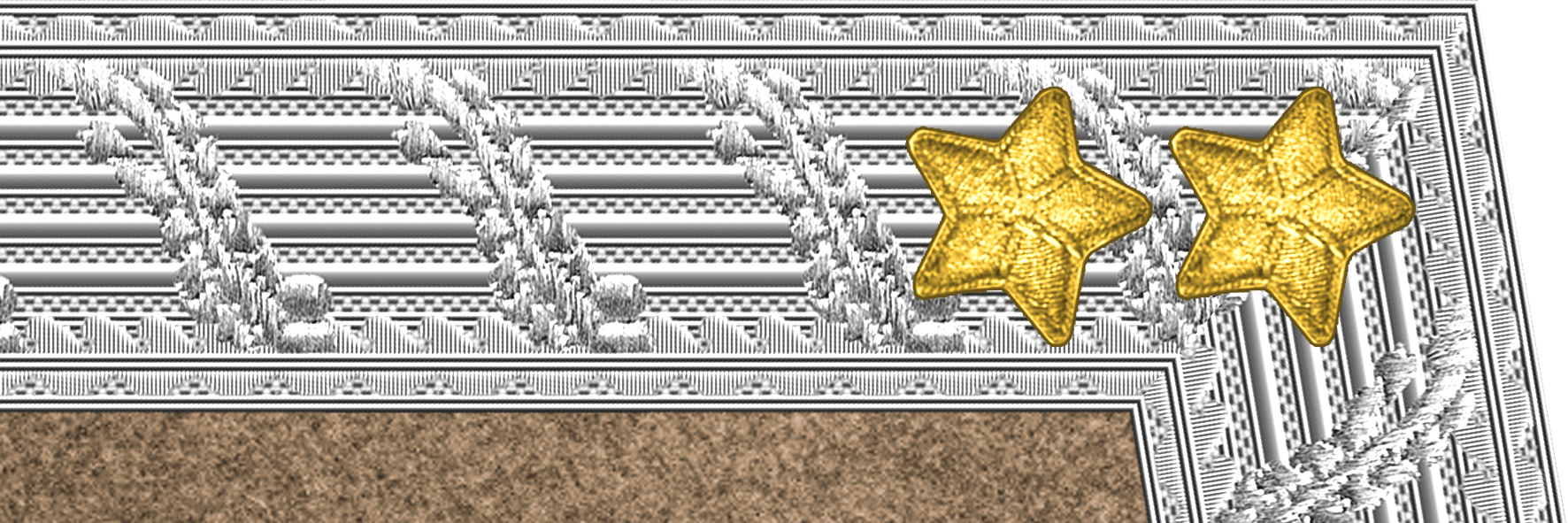
Collar patch on uniform m/1923
(1923–1939)

=== Shoulder marks ===
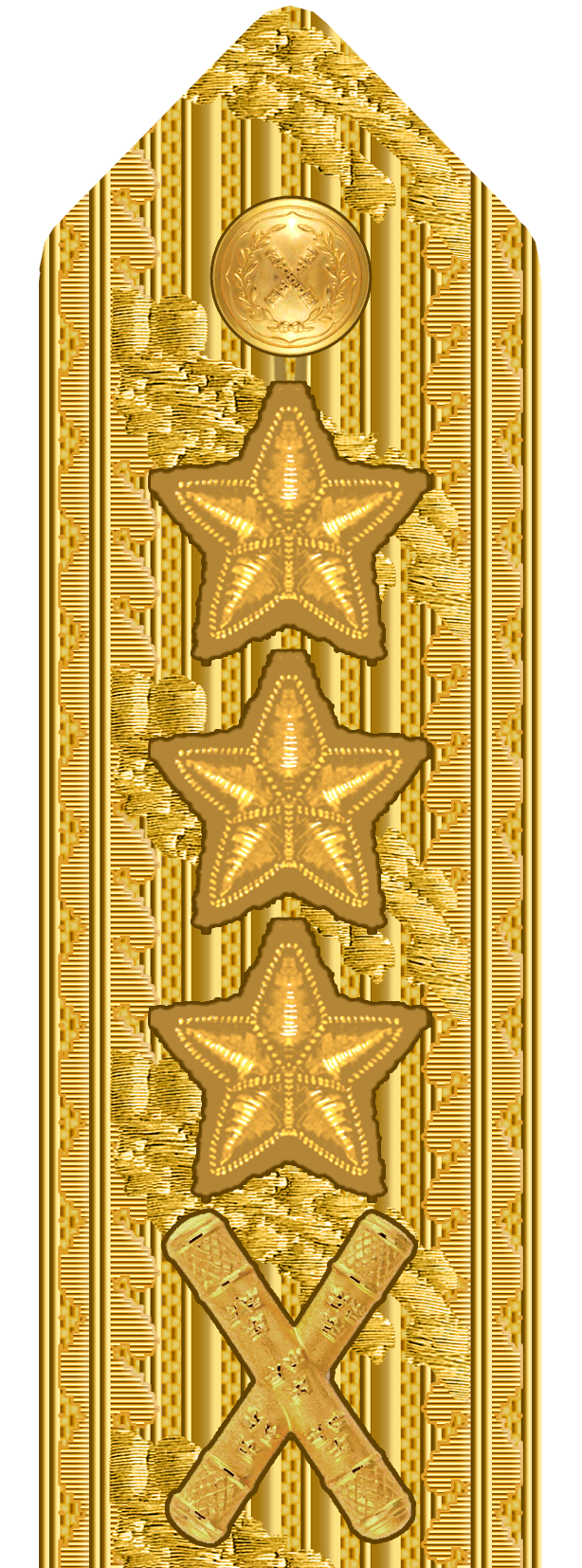
Shoulder mark on uniform m/87 (Army)
(1987–present)

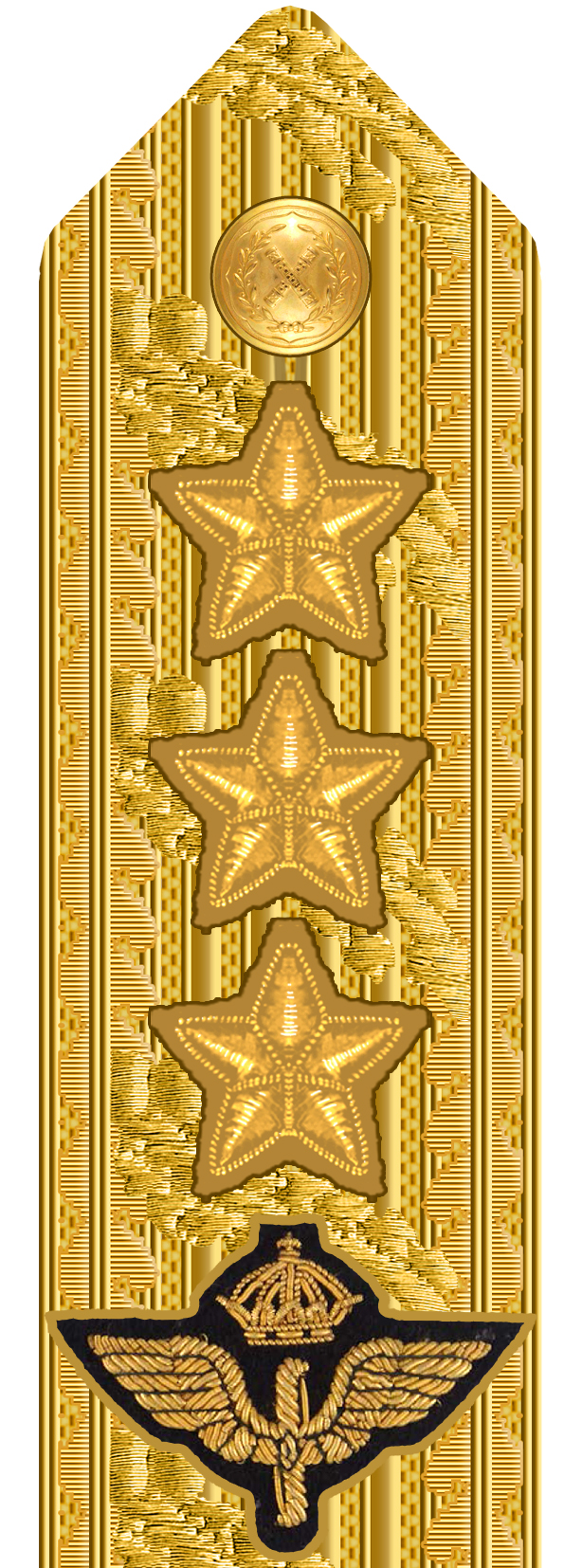
Shoulder mark on uniform m/87 (Air Force)
(1987–present)

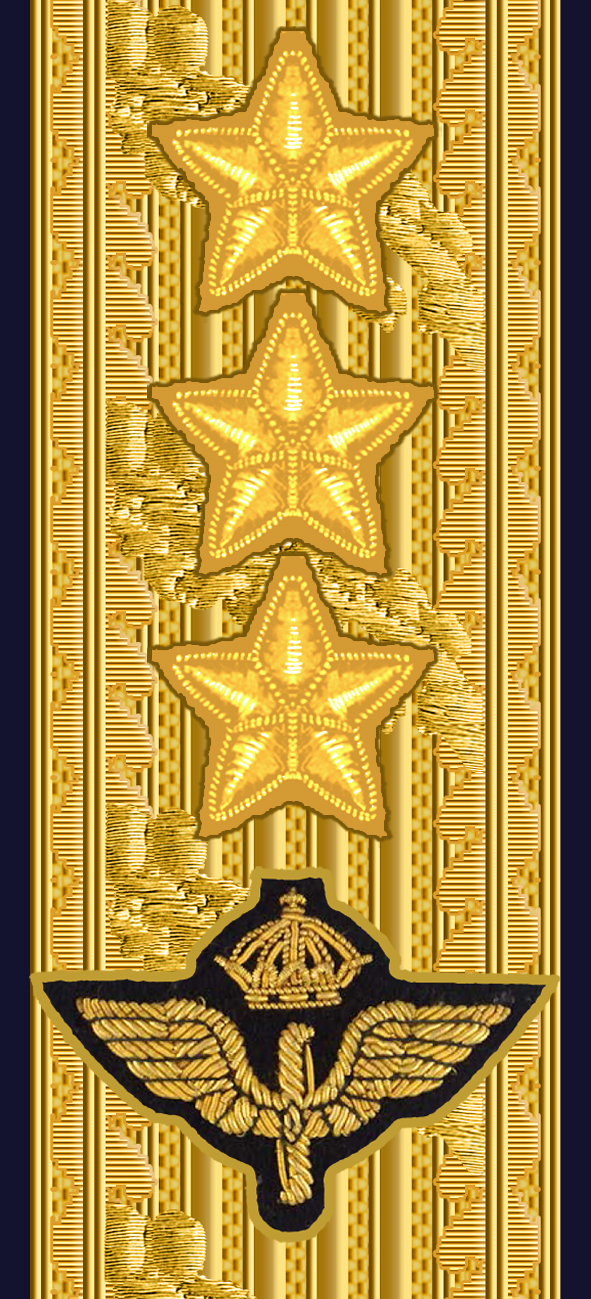
Shoulder mark m/87 on white shirt (Air Force)
(1987–present)

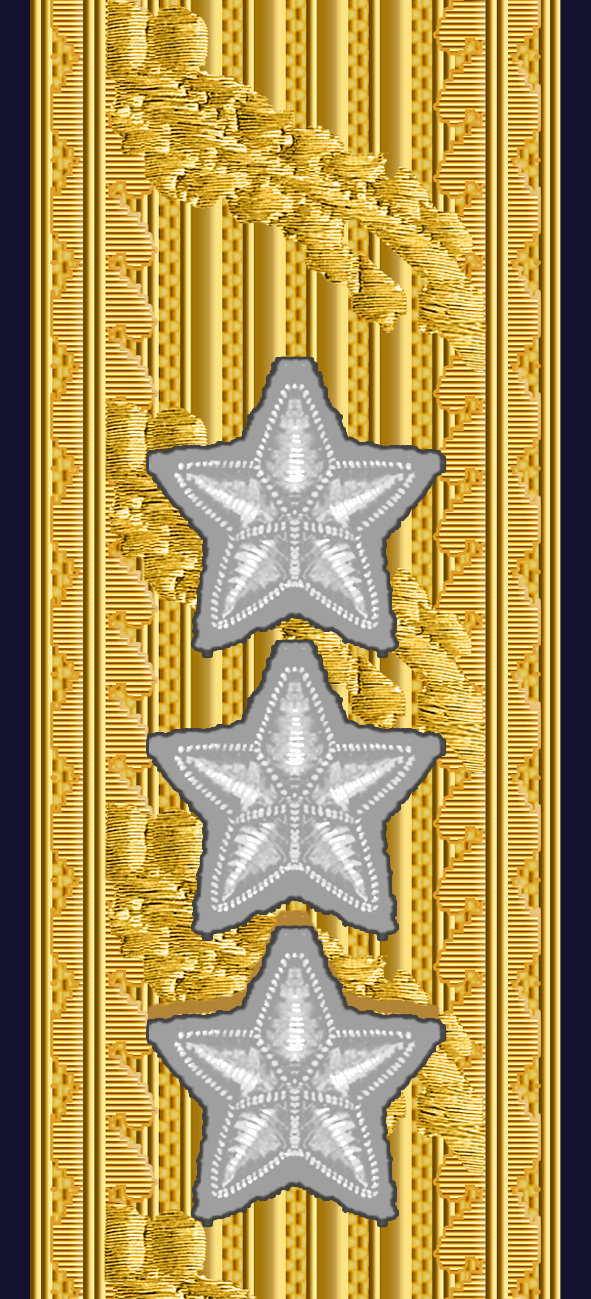
Shoulder mark m/87 on uniform m/87 - white and white shirt (Navy)
(1987–present)

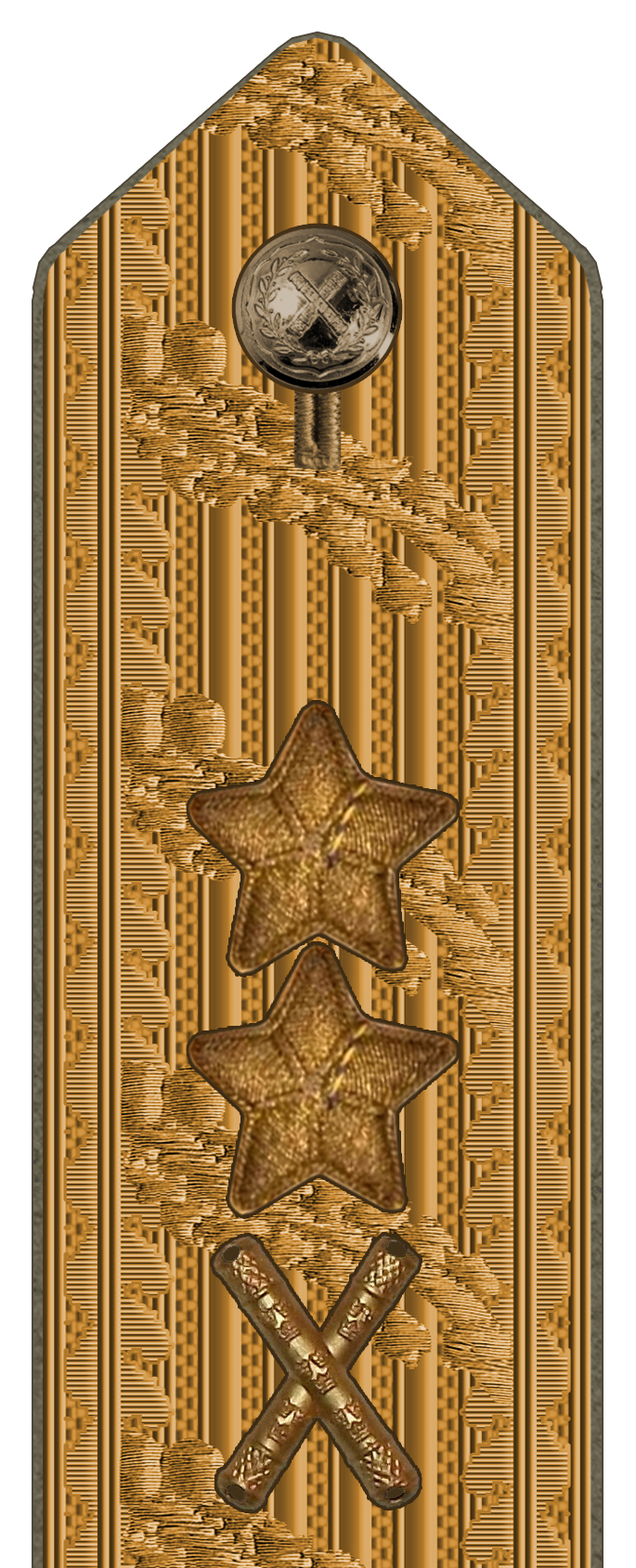
Shoulder mark on uniform m/1939
(1939–1958)

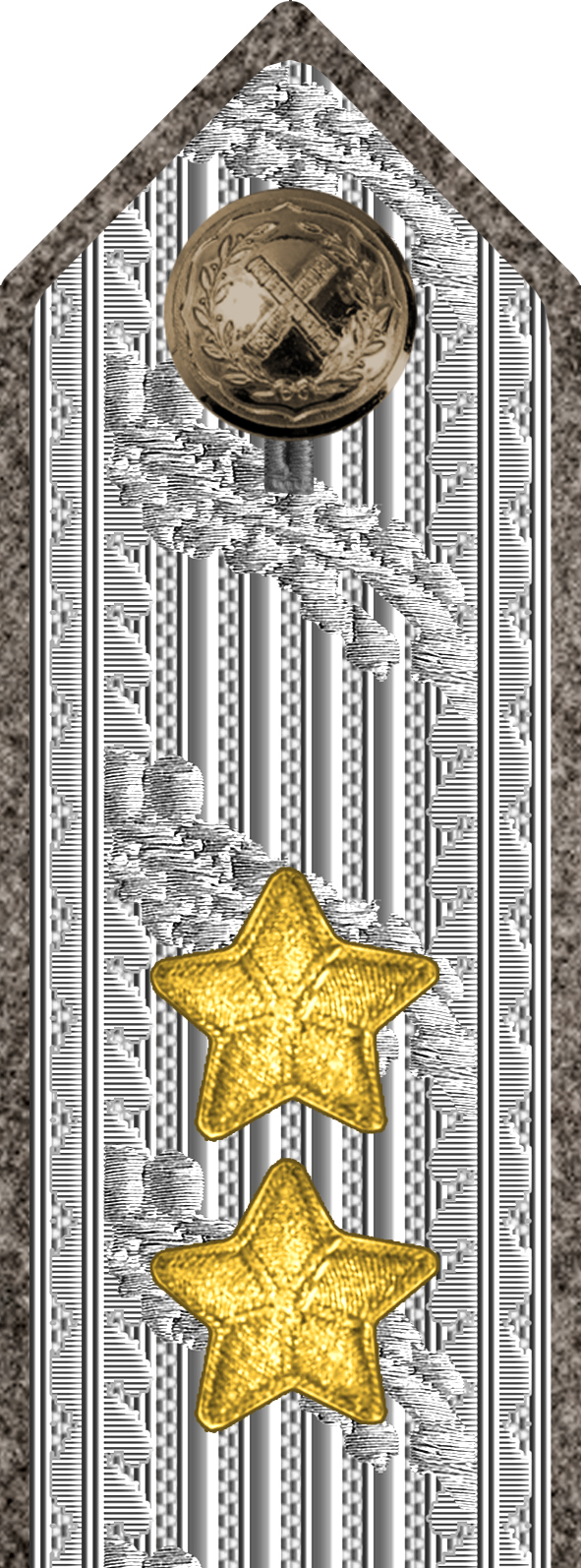
Shoulder mark on uniform m/1923
(1923–1939)

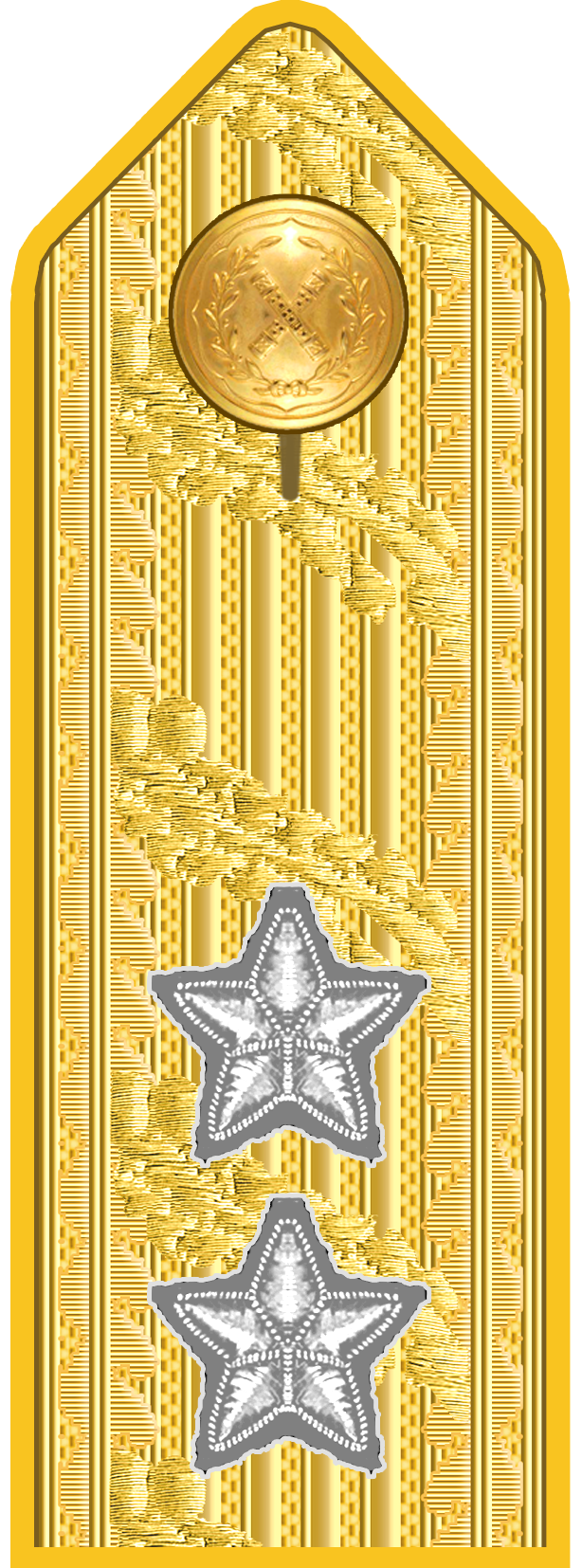
Shoulder mark on uniform m/1910
(1910–1923)

=== Sleeve insignias ===
==== Amphibious Corps and Coastal Artillery ====
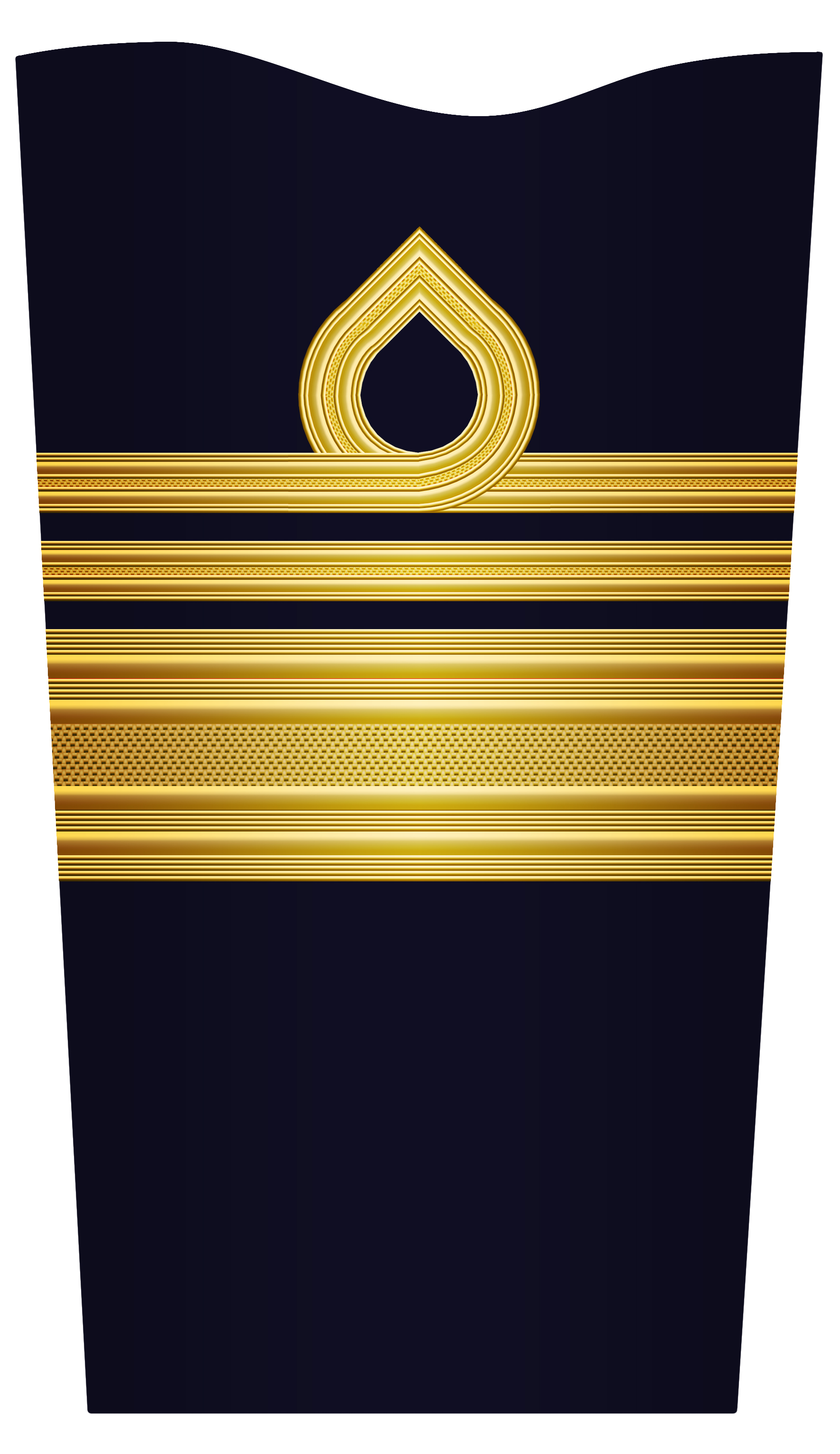
Sleeve insignia for a lieutenant general in the Amphibious Corps
(2003–present)

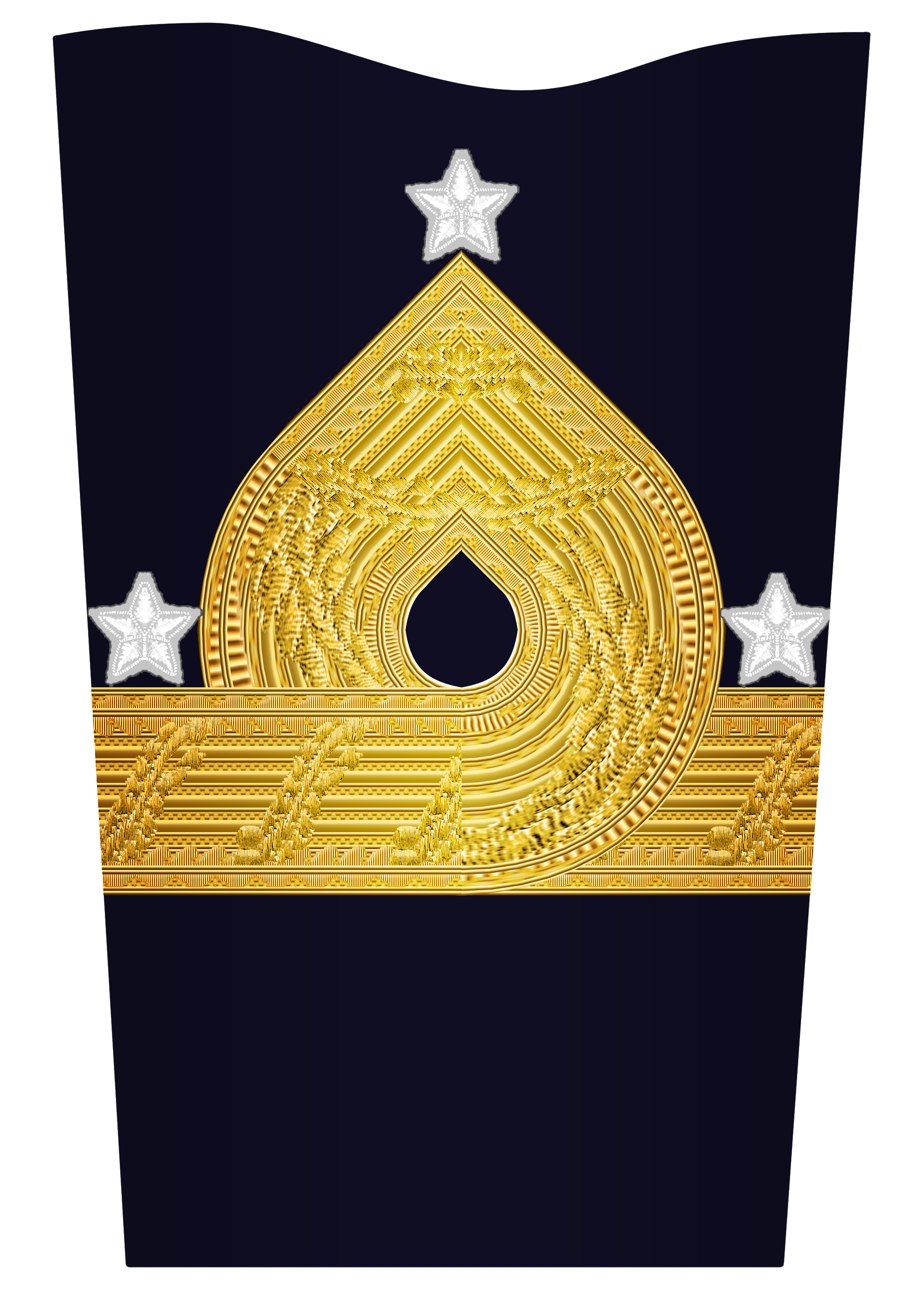
Sleeve insignia for a lieutenant general in the Amphibious Corps
(2000–2003)
and
Coastal Artillery
(1972–2000)

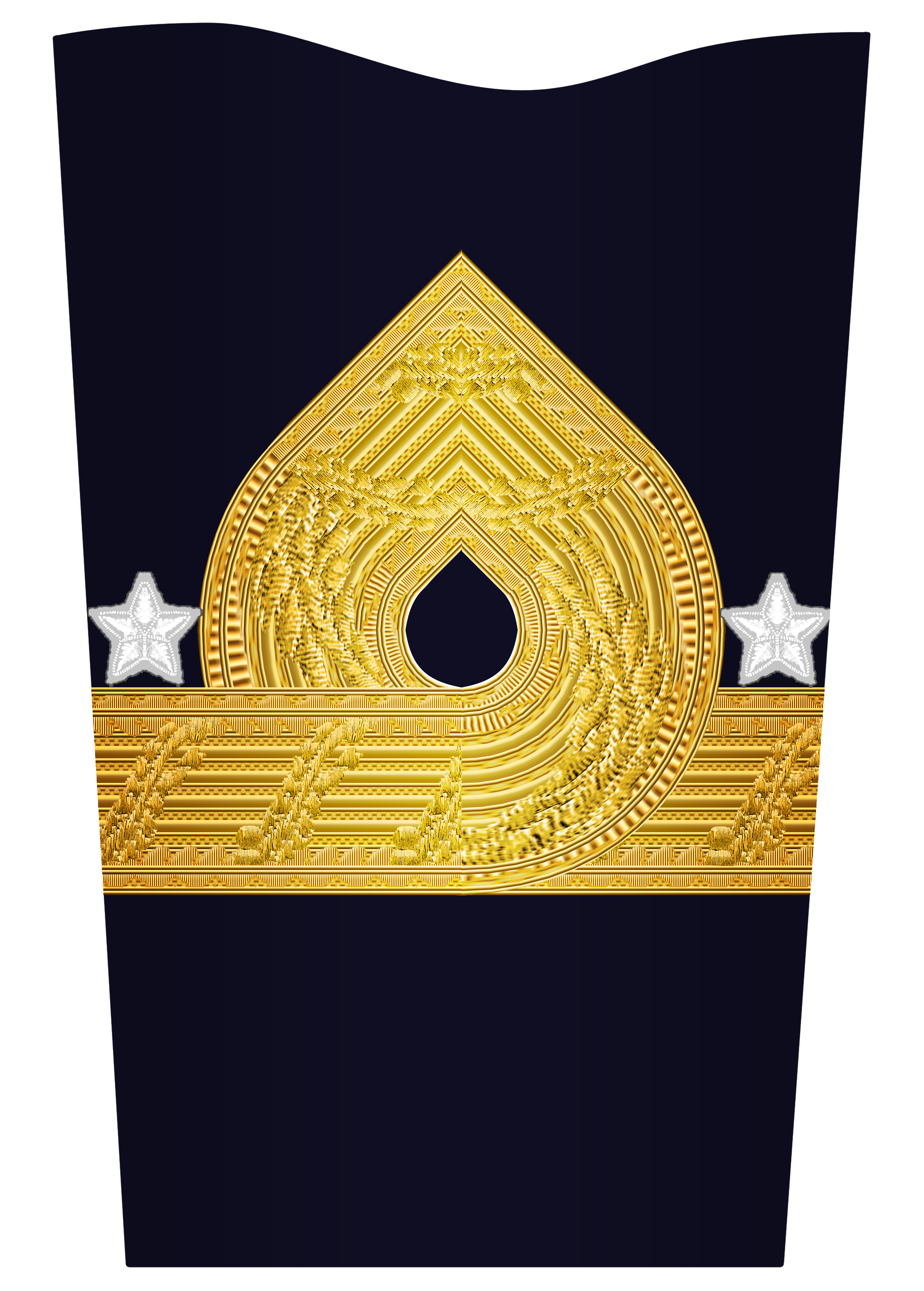
Sleeve insignia for a lieutenant general in the Coastal Artillery
(1901–1972)

==== Air Force ====
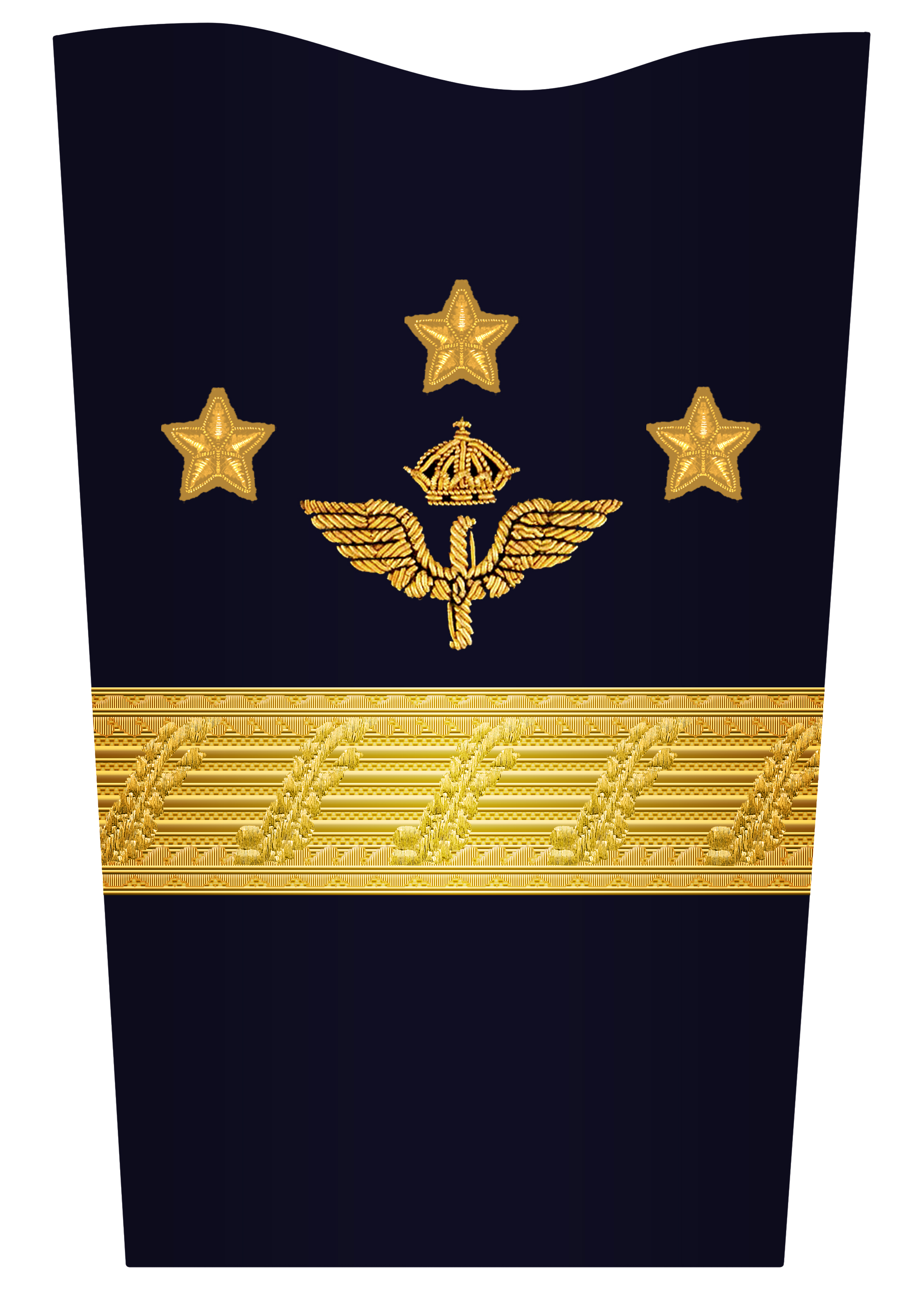
Sleeve insignia for a lieutenant general (1972–?) (today only on mess dress uniform)

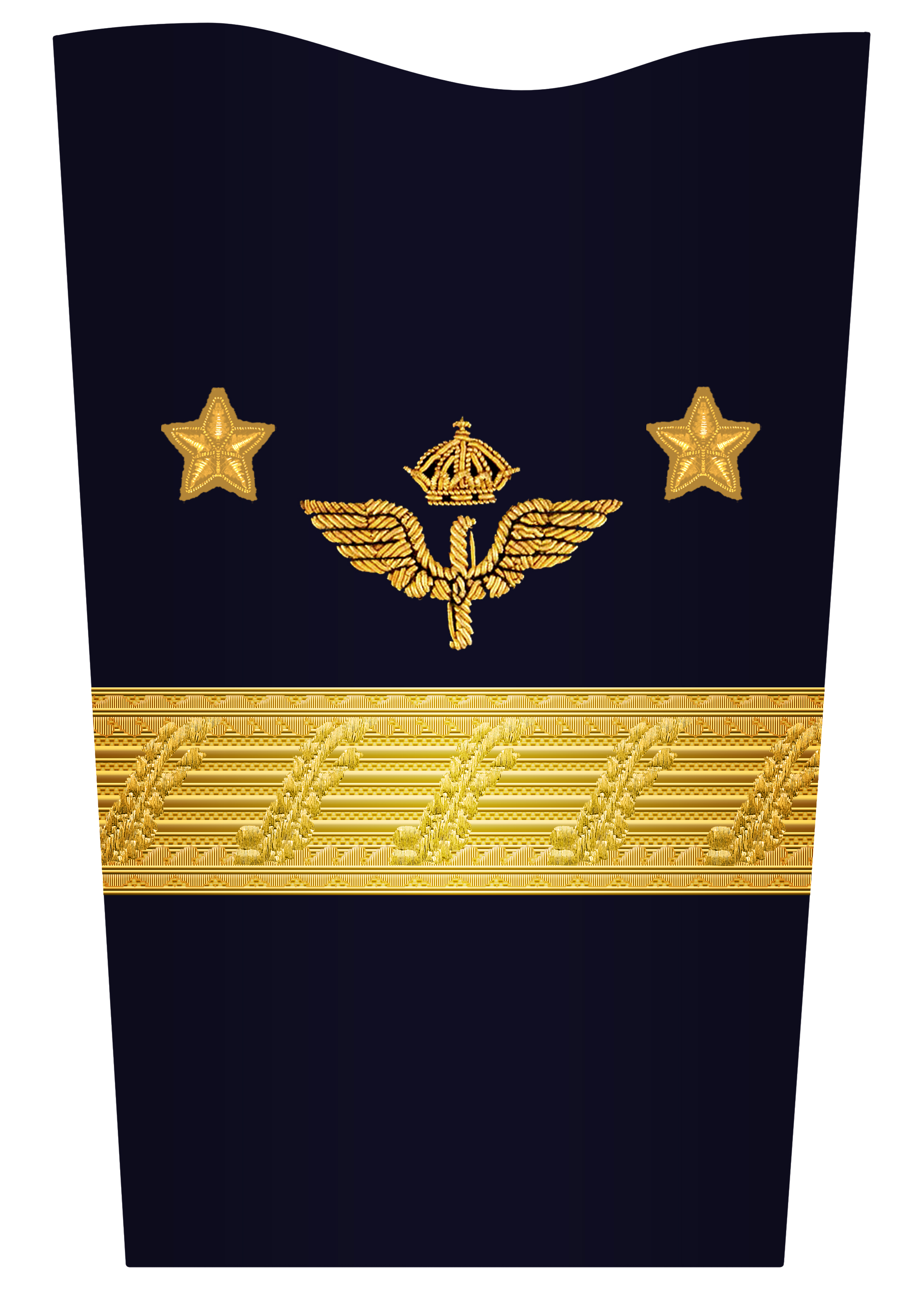
Sleeve insignia for a lieutenant general (?–1972)

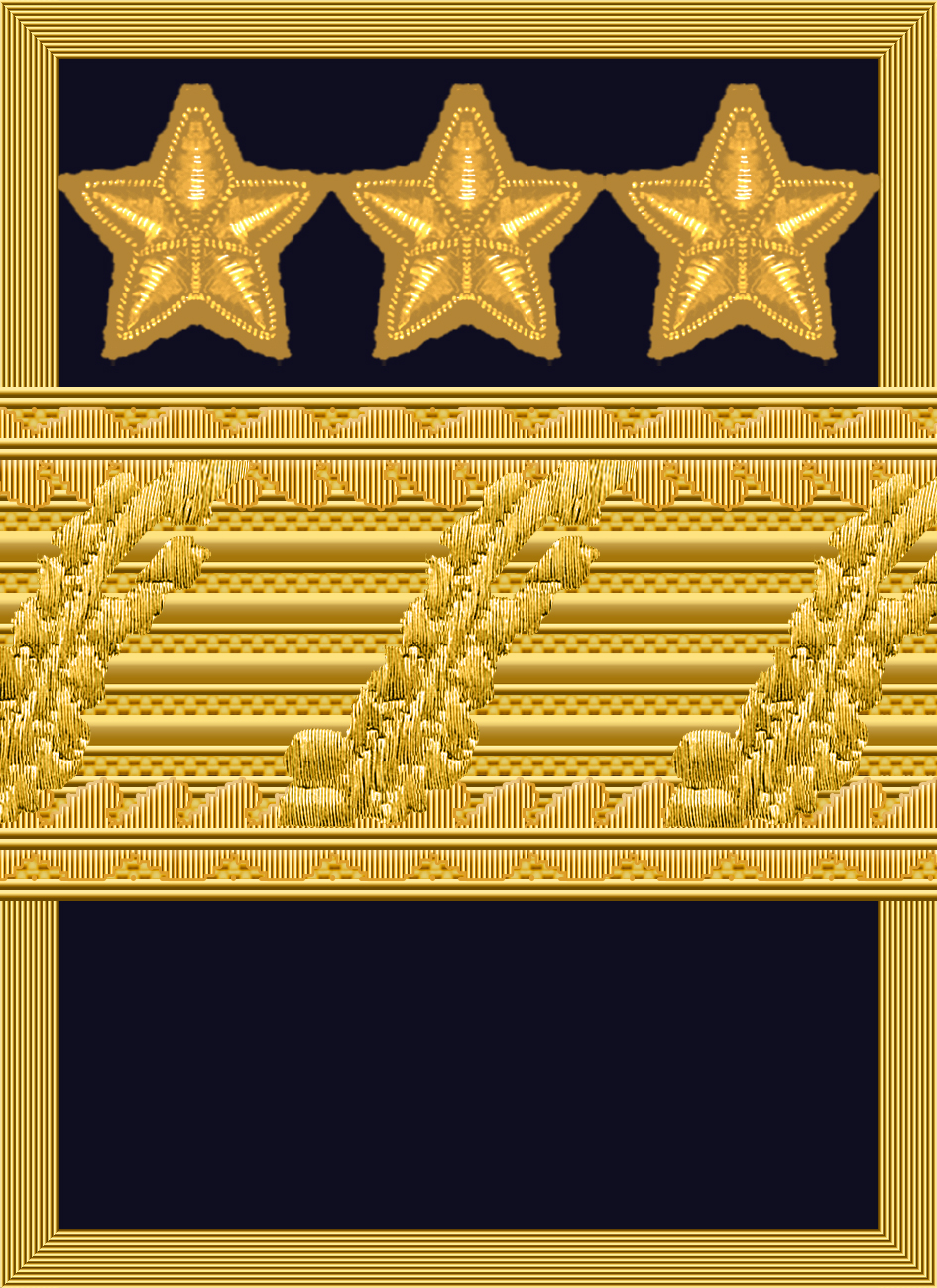
Flight suit sleeve insignia (Ärmmatta m/02) for a lieutenant general
(1972–present)

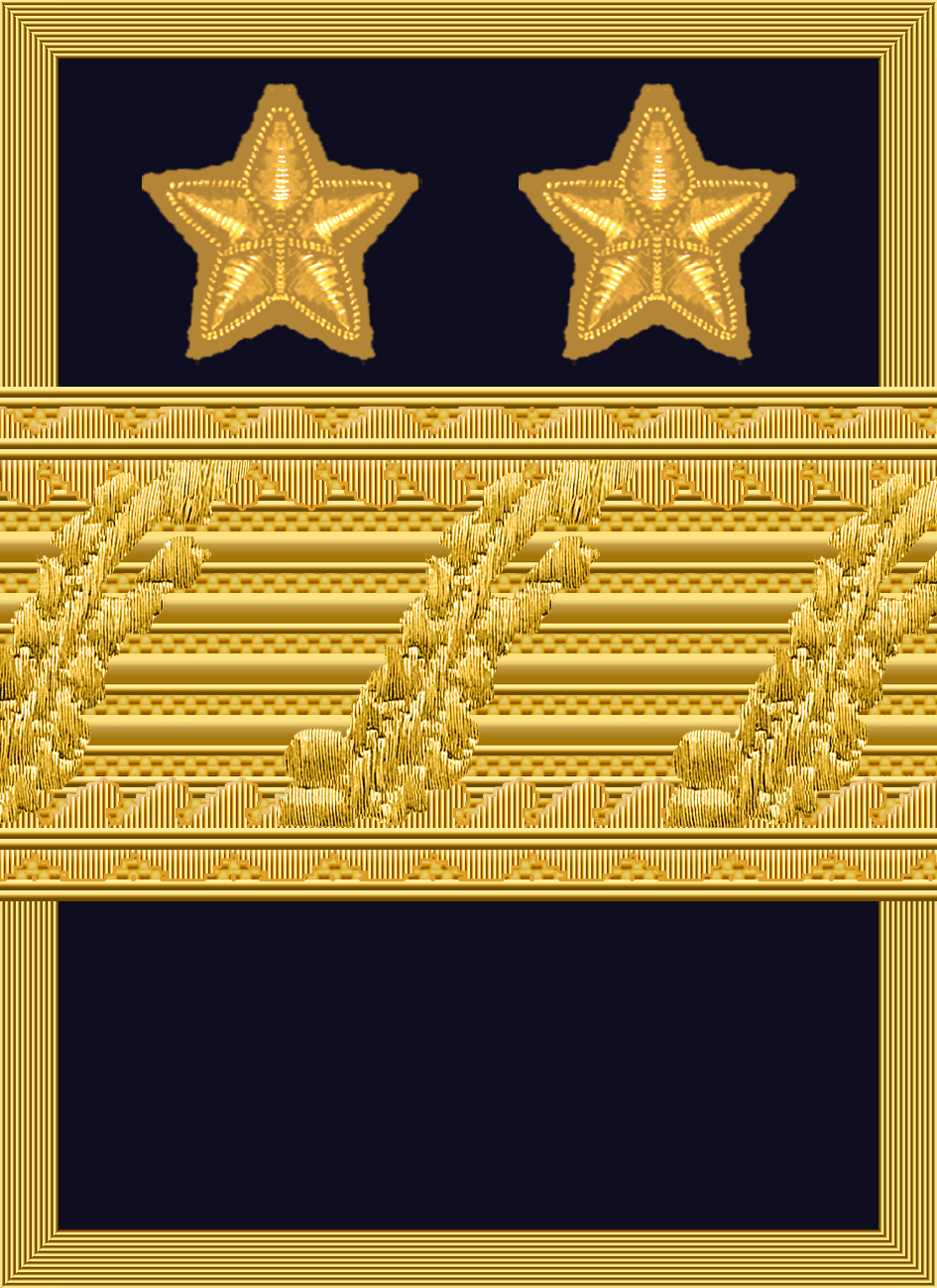
Flight suit sleeve insignia for a lieutenant general
(?–1972)

==== Army ====
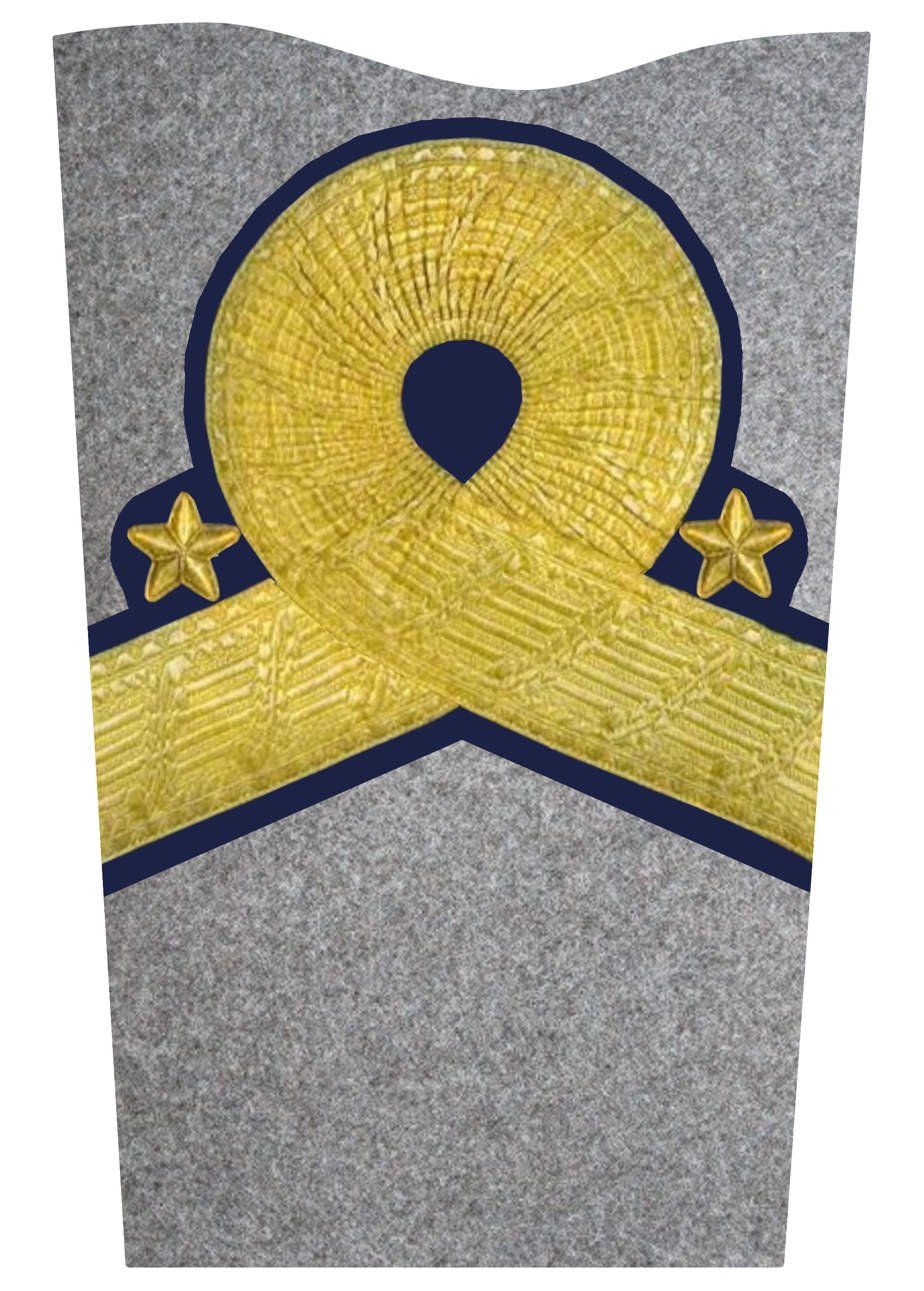
Sleeve insignia for a lieutenant general on uniform m/1906
(1906–1923)

=== Hats ===
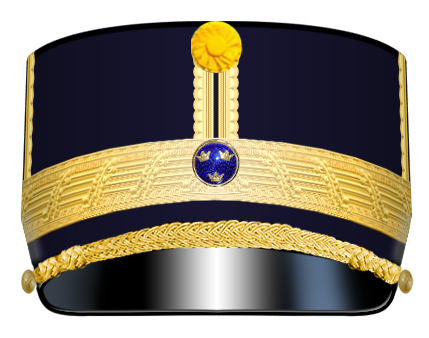
Hat for general of any rank on uniform m/1865-99
(1865–?)

== Personal flags ==
The command flag of a lieutenant general (and a vice admiral) is a double swallowtailed Swedish flag. In the first blue field 3 five-pointed white stars placed one over two.

Lieutenant general/Vice admiral flag
(1972–present)

== See also ==
- List of Swedish Air Force lieutenant generals
- List of Swedish Army lieutenant generals after 1900
- List of Swedish Navy lieutenant generals
