= Royal Swedish Army Ordnance Administration =

Royal Swedish Army Ordnance Administration (Swedish: Kungliga Armétygförvaltningen, KATF) was a Swedish administrative authority which existed from 1954 to 1968. It sorted under the Ministry of Defence and had the task of overseeing the ordnance administration of the Swedish Army (from 1966 it was the central administrative authority for the administration of the ordnance and ammunition). From 1964 to 1968, the authority was called the Royal Swedish Army Materiel Administration (Kungliga Arméförvaltningen, KAF). (Note: Not to be confused by the Royal Swedish Army Materiel Administration which existed between 1866 and 1954.)

== History and organisation ==
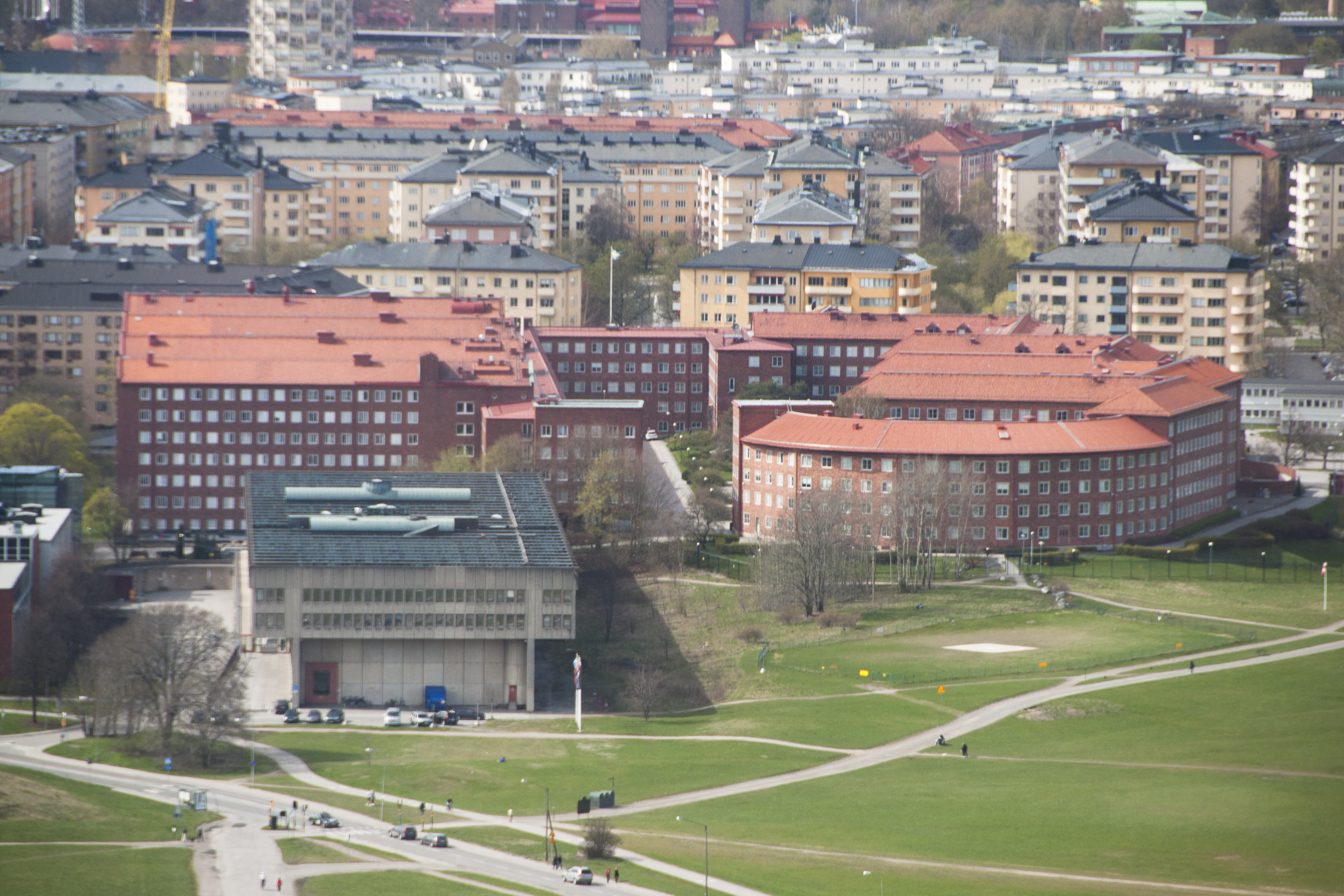
The authority was located in the Tre Vapen building in Stockholm, seen here from the Kaknäs Tower.

The Ordnance Department of the Royal Swedish Army Materiel Administration (KAFT) was reformed on 1 July 1954, into an independent authority under the name of Armétygförvaltningen ("Army Ordnance Administration"). At the same time, the Commissariat Department of the Royal Swedish Army Materiel Administration had been reformed into the Royal Swedish Army Supply Administration, which meant that the Royal Swedish Army Materiel Administration ceased. After the Royal Swedish Army Supply Administration on 1 July 1963 was amalgamated into the Quartermaster Administration of the Swedish Armed Forces, the Royal Swedish Army Ordnance Administration changed name on 1 July 1964 to the Royal Swedish Army Materiel Administration (Arméförvaltningen). The Quartermaster Administration of the Swedish Armed Forces and the new Royal Swedish Army Materiel Administration was amalgamated into the Defence Materiel Administration on 1 July 1968.

The Chief of the Army was also chief of the Royal Swedish Army Ordnance Administration from its formation until 30 June 1963. During this period, the closest command over the authority was exercised by a vice chief (souschef), who had the title of Master-General of the Ordnance. From 1 July 1963, the head of the authority (still under the title of Master-General of the Ordnance) was no longer subordinate to the Chief of the Army. At the authority, there was also the Deputy Chief of Ordnance, who, from 1 July 1957, was deputy to the vice chief and from 1 July 1963, deputy to the head of the authority. The vice chief (1954–1963) and the chief (1963–1968) were from 1954 to 1968 members of the Administration Board of the Swedish Armed Forces.

The authority initially consisted of five departments: Vapenavdelningen ("Weapons Department"), Fordonsavdelningen ("Vehicle Department"), Elektroavdelningen ("Electrical Department"), Verkstadsavdelningen ("Workshop Department") and Inköpsavdelningen ("Purchasing Department"). In addition, there were four independent bureaus: Tygförrådsbyrån ("Ordnance Storage Bureau"), Ammunitionsförrådsbyrån ("Ammunition Storage Bureau"), Normaliebyrån and Administrativa byrån ("Administrative Bureau"). Other units were the Centralplaneringen ("Central Planning"), the Materielinspektionen ("Materiel Inspection"), Provskjutningscentralen ("Test Firing Center") and Personalkårexpeditionen ("Administrative Corps' Office"). The Test Firing Center was amalgamated into a unit of the Weapons Department on 1 July 1957. The Central Planning and the Materiel Inspection were subordinated to the Deputy Chief of Ordnance from 1 July 1962. On 1 July 1964, the Underrättelsecentralen ("Intelligence Center") was added and on 1 January 1966 the Datacentralen was added ("Data Center"), which also were subordinate to the Deputy Chief of Ordnance. The heads of the Workshop Department and the Purchasing Department were referred to as the Chief of the Swedish Army Electrical and Mechanical Engineers' Corps (Arméöverdirektör) and Purchasing Director (Inköpsdirektör) respectively. The head of the Administrative Office was referred to as Krigsråd (military councillor). The authority's board consisted of the Deputy Chief of Ordnance, the heads of departments and the head of the Administrative Bureau. On 1 July 1968, the Royal Swedish Army Materiel Administration's hierarchical organization (except the Administrative Bureau) was transferred largely unchanged to the Army Materiel Administration (Armématerielförvaltningen, FMV-A) in the Defence Materiel Administration.

The Royal Swedish Army Ordnance Administration's personnel in 1954 amounted to approximately 1,350 people. Of these, about 360 served in the Weapons Department, about 210 in the Vehicle Department, about 210 in the Electrical Department, about 130 in the Workshop Department and about 80 in the Purchasing Department. A total of about 330 people served in the Ordnance Storage Bureau, the Ammunition Storage Bureau, the Normaliebyrån, the Test Firing Center and the Administrative Bureau. In addition, a total of about 25 people were included in the Central Planning and the Materiel Inspection.

In 1964, the authority's personnel amounted to approximately 1,375 people. Of these, about 340 served in the Weapons Department, about 220 in the Vehicle Department, about 215 in the Electrical Department, about 125 in the Workshop Department and about 65 in the Purchasing Department. The Ordnance Storage Bureau, the Ammunition Storage Bureau, the Normaliebyrån and the Administrative Bureau consisted of a total of approximately 370 people. In addition, a total of about 40 people served in the Central Planning, the Intelligence Center and the Materiel Inspection, all three of whom were subordinate to the Deputy Chief of Ordnance.

The authority's activities were regulated by the following instructions:

- King in Council's provisional instruction for the Royal Swedish Army Ordnance Administration, Tjänstemeddelanden rörande lantförsvaret, serie A (TLA), 1954:43 (in force 1954-07-01–1959-06-30), with amendments in TLA 1957:53 (in force 1957-07-01).
- King in Council's instruction for the Royal Swedish Army Ordnance Administration, SFS 1959:8 (in force 1959-07-01–1963-06-30), with amendments in SFS 1961:472 (in force 1961-10-01) and SFS 1962:336 (in force 1962-07-01).
- King in Council's instruction for the Royal Swedish Army Ordnance Administration, SFS 1963:287 (in force 1963-07-01–1964-06-30).
- King in Council's instruction for the Royal Swedish Army Materiel Administration, SFS 1964:371 (in force 1964-07-01–1965-12-31).
- King in Council's instruction for the Royal Swedish Army Materiel Administration, SFS 1965:829 (in force 1966-01-01–1968-06-30).

== Activities ==
=== 1954 instruction ===
The authority's 1954 instruction stated: ”the Royal Swedish Army Ordnance Administration exercises under the King in Council in technical and economic terms, the top management and oversight of the ordnance administration in the Swedish Army." In addition, the authority was obliged:

to, as far as the authority concerns, make arrangements for the measures that are necessary for the army to be equipped with appropriate and complete ordnance and ammunition;

to ensure that the army's ordnance and ammunition are kept in a timely and usable condition as well as monitoring that the army belonging to and other subordinate supplies of the Royal Swedish Army Ordnance Administration are in complete and good condition;

to take steps, in accordance with the instructions of the Supreme Commander, to follow in their field the technical developments abroad as well as to process the collected material and to provide it with the necessary information in this regard;

to establish drawings and designations for the army's ordnance and ammunition, insofar as such is not the responsibility of the King in Council or any other authority;

to manage the funds made available by the King in Council to the authority, as well as the other funds, which are subject to the authority's supervision and management;

to, in respect of the office of the Royal Swedish Army Ordnance Administration, exercise control over the management of the administrative affairs of the subordinate authorities, as well as ensure that an efficient management of funds and equipment and more takes place;

to conduct investigations and submit statements in cases, which are remitted by the King in Council or head of state department, to the authority;

to assist the Supreme Commander in drafting the proposals that affect the authority's field of work and which the Supreme Commander may find necessary to convey to the King in Council;

to submit to the Supreme Commander the opinions and inquiries which he may request and the authority may submit; and

to communicate to the Chief of the Defence Staff, the other central administrative authorities of the Swedish defense, as well as the Administration Board of the Swedish Armed Forces, the information which they deem necessary with regard to the tasks at hand and which affect the field of the Royal Swedish Army Ordnance Administration.

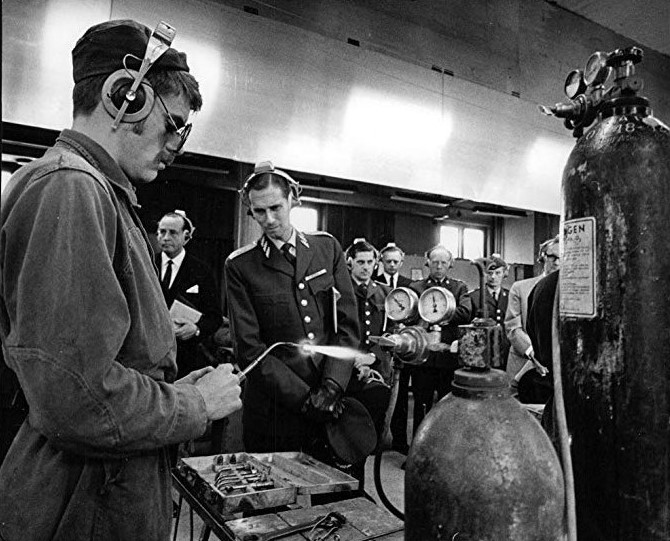
Acting Master-General of the Ordnance and head of the Royal Swedish Army Materiel Administration, Major General Ove Ljung visits the Swedish Ordnance Administration School (Tygförvaltningsskolan) in 1967. In the foreground we see conscript Leif Gustavsson who learns welding through programmed teaching.

=== 1959, 1963 and 1964 instructions ===
The authority's 1959 instruction stated: ”the Royal Swedish Army Ordnance Administration exercises under the King in Council in technical and economic terms, the management and oversight of the ordnance administration in the Swedish Army.” This was changed in the 1963 instruction to: ”the Royal Swedish Army Ordnance Administration exercises under the King in Council in technical and economic terms, the management and oversight of the administration of the army of ordnance and ammunition.” The wording was repeated in the 1964 instruction, except that the name of the authority was changed to the Royal Swedish Army Materiel Administration (Arméförvaltningen). In addition, the authority was specifically obliged:

to make arrangements for the army to be equipped with, for its combat readiness, appropriate and complete ordnance and ammunition;

to ensure that the army's ordnance and ammunition [in 1963 changed to "army vehicles, equipment, armament and other ordnance and ammunition”] are kept in a timely and usable condition [in 1964 changed to as well as”] and, as far as the office of authority concerns, monitor that the army's storages are complete and in good condition;

to, in respect of the office of the Royal Swedish Army Ordnance Administration [in 1964 changed to "Royal Swedish Army Materiel Administration (Arméförvaltningen)”], exercise control over the management of the administrative affairs of the subordinate authorities, also by ensuring, among other things, stock control, that an efficient management of funds and equipment takes place;

to follow the technical development in the Royal Swedish Army Ordnance Administration's [in 1964 changed to "Royal Swedish Army Materiel Administration (Arméförvaltningen)”] field of work, process the collected material and provide it with the necessary information in this regard; and

to establish drawings, models and designations of the army's ordnance and ammunition, insofar as such is not the responsibility of the King in Council or any other authority.

=== 1965 instruction ===
The authority's 1965 instruction stated: ”The Royal Swedish Army Materiel Administration (Arméförvaltningen) is the central administrative authority for the administration of the army ordnance and ammunition.” In addition, the authority was specifically obliged:

to take measures to supply the army with ordnance and ammunition,

to ensure that the army's ordnance and ammunition are appropriate and usable and are appropriately stored,

to monitor technical progress and to process the collected material and to provide information in this regard,

to establish drawings, models and designations of the army's ordnance and ammunition, insofar as such is not the responsibility of the King in Council or any other authority.

=== Purchased materiel ===
Among the materiel that the authority procured are: Stridsvagn 81, Pansarbandvagn 301, Pansarvärnspjäs 1110, Ksp 58 machine gun, Infanterikanonvagn 103, Lastterrängbil 912, artillery tractor (Volvo T32 with Haubits m/40), Stridsvagn 74, Lastterrängbil 957, Bandkanon 1, Haubits 4140, piercing projectiles, high-explosive anti-tank warheads, Stridsvagn 103, Pansarbandvagn 302, Bandvagn 202, 40 mm lvakan m/48, Spaningsradar PS-04/R, Centralinstrumentering 760, Luftvärnsrobot 67, FIM-43 Redeye (Luftvärnsrobot 69), Bantam (Pansarvärnsrobotsystem 53), Automatkarbin 4 and Radiolänkstation 320.

== Heads ==
Master-General of the Ordnance and the vice chiefs of the authority

- 1954–1959: Major General Birger Hedqvist
- 1959–1963: Major General Edward Malm

Master-General of the Ordnance and heads of the authority

- 1963–1964: Major General Edward Malm
- 1964–1968: Major General Sten Wåhlin, off duty from 1966
- 1966–1968: Major General Ove Ljung (acting)

Deputy Chief of Ordnance

- 1954–1956: Major General Anders Nordström
- 1956–1959: Colonel Edward Malm
- 1959–1964: Colonel Fredrik Hård af Segerstad
- 1964–1968: Colonel Erik Envall, promoted to major general in 1966

Heads of the Vapenavdelningen ("Weapons Department")

- 1954–1964: Colonel Harald Jentzen
- 1964–1968: Colonel Gunnar Grenander

Heads of the Fordonsavdelningen ("Vehicle Department")

- 1954–1960: Colonel Eric Gillner
- 1960–1966: Colonel Hugo Höglund
- 1966–1968: Colonel Carl-Henrich Hagberg

Head of the Elektroavdelningen ("Electric Department")

- 1954–1968: Lieutenant Colonel Lennart Nyström, promoted to colonel in 1957

Arméöverdirektörer and heads of the Verkstadsavdelningen ("Workshop Department") (Note: As well as Chief of the Swedish Army Electrical and Mechanical Engineers' Corps.)

- 1954–1964: Civ.ing. Bo Ehnbom
- 1964–1968: Civ.ing. Carl-Gustaf Regårdh

Purchasing Directors and heads of the Inköpsavdelningen ("Purchasing Department")

- 1954–1966: Major Arne Welander
- 1966–1968: Civilekonom Gunnar Lundquister

Heads of the Tygförrådsbyrån ("Ordnance Storage Bureau")

- 1954–1960: Colonel Per Olof Ingwar Grundell
- 1960–1968: Colonel Fritz Lindohf

Heads of the Ammunitionsförrådsbyrån ("Ammunition Storage Bureau")

- 1954–1965: Lieutenant Colonel Gustaf Murray
- 1965–1968: Lieutenant Colonel Bror Anders Arvid Rönnlund

Head of the Normaliebyrån

- 1954–1968: Civ.ing. Bror Bergman

Krigsråd (military councillor) and head of Administrativa byrån ("Administrative Bureau")

- 1954–1968: Juris kandidat Nils Wettergren

Heads of the Centralplaneringen ("Central Planning")

- 1954–1959: Colonel Seth Wassberg
- 1959–1965: Lieutenant Colonel Åke Silfverhielm, promoted to colonel in 1960
- 1965–1966: Colonel Carl-Henrich Hagberg
- 1966–1968: Lieutenant Colonel Gunnar Engdahl

Heads of the Materielinspektionen ("Materiel Inspection")

- 1954–1957: Civ.ing., Army Director Arvid Öman
- 1957–1958: Lieutenant Colonel Gösta Holmström
- 1958–1968: Civ.ing., Army Director Nils Wannborg

Heads of the Provskjutningscentralen ("Test Firing Center")

- 1954–1955: Captain John Gustaf Bertil Särnman
- 1955–1957: Major Gösta Holmström

Heads of the Personalkårexpeditionen ("Administrative Corps' Office")

- 1954–1956: Major Gösta Appeltofft
- 1956–1966: Lieutenant Colonel Stig Daniel Roland Hammarlund
- 1966–1968: Lieutenant Colonel Erik Danckwardt-Lillieström

== See also ==
- Royal Swedish Army Materiel Administration
