= Lars Brising =

Swedish engineer and aircraft designer

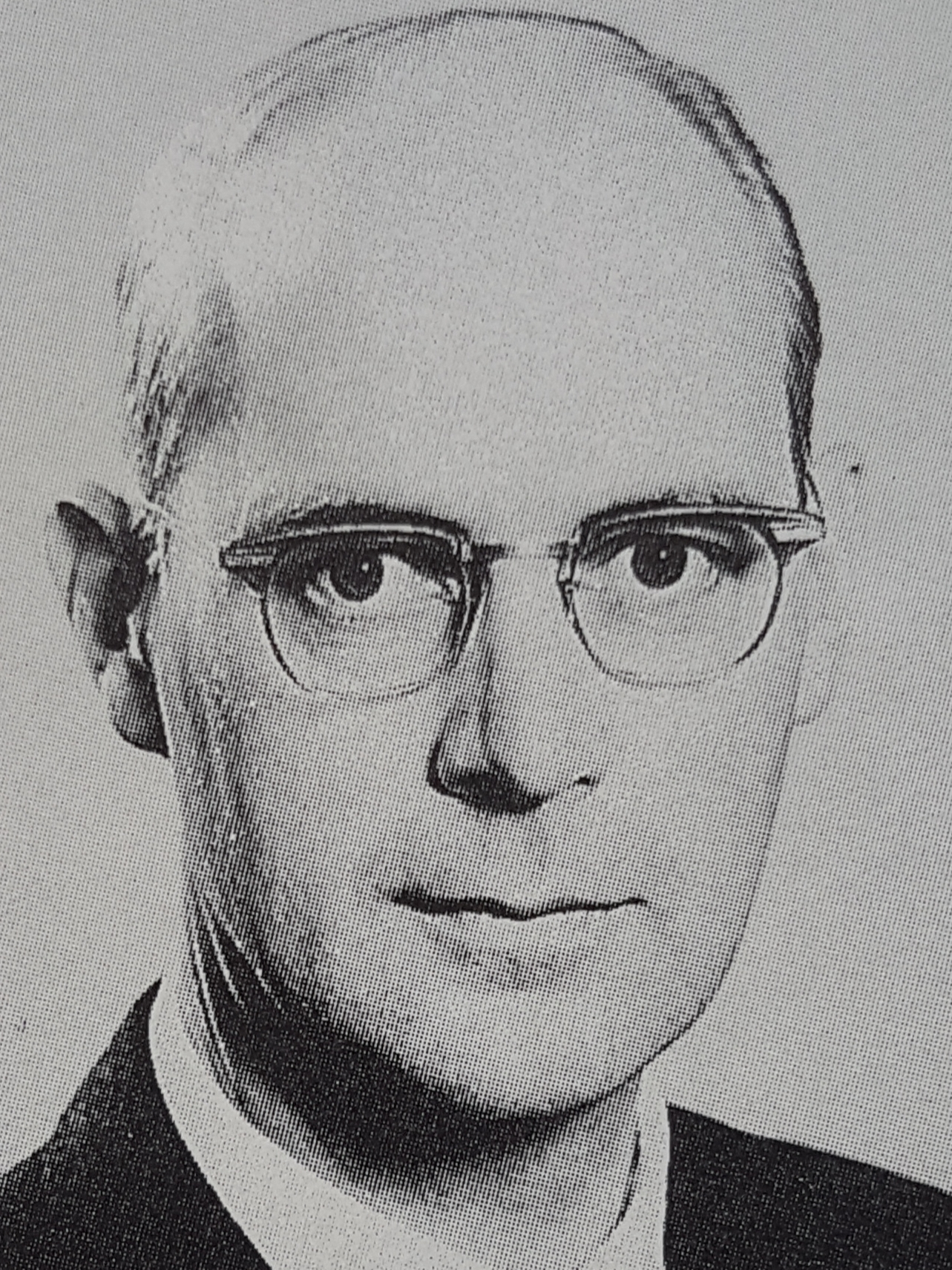
- Lars Brising
- Born: 18 May 1915; Stockholm, Sweden
- Died: June 4, 1995 (aged 80); Stockholm, Sweden
- Citizenship: Sweden
- Education: Master of Science in Aeronautical Engineering at KTH Royal Institute of Technology, Stockholm Sweden 1938
- Occupation: Aircraft design / manager civil service
- Known for: Expert Aerodynamics; Saab 29 Tunnan; Saab construction manager Head of Royal Swedish Air Force Materiel Administration
- Title: Major General
- Spouse: Maja Brita Brising

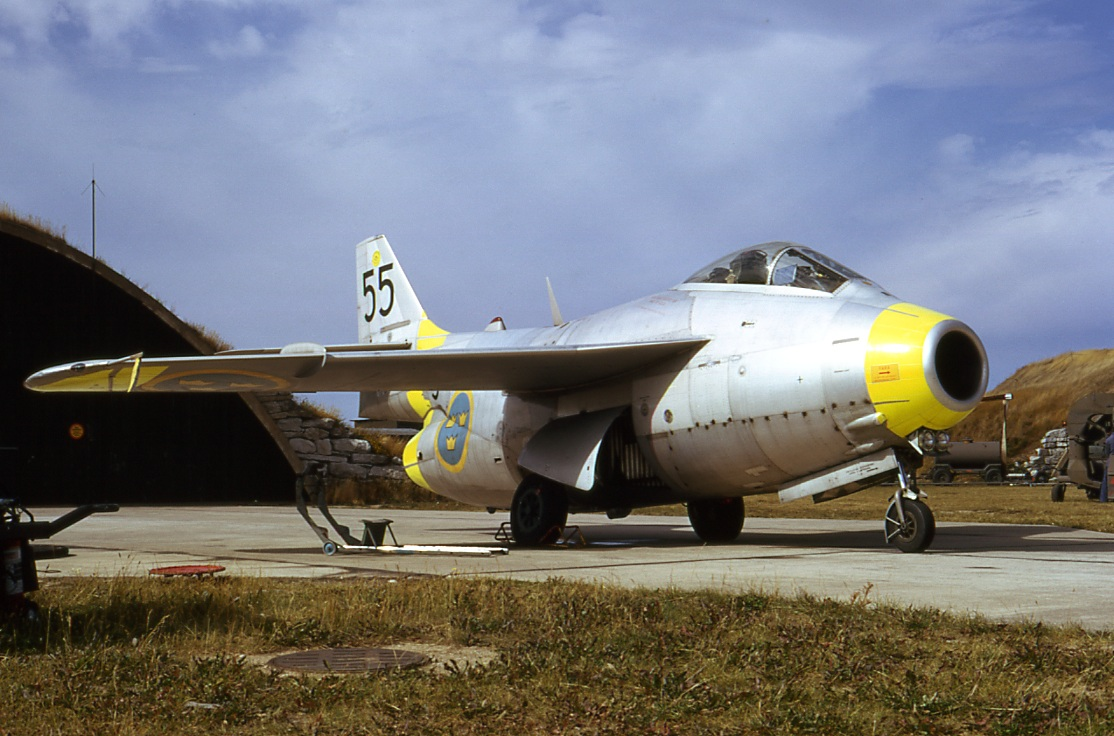
Saab 29 Tunnan

Lars Harald Brising (1915-1995) was a Swedish engineer and aircraft designer. He is best known for having been chief designer for Saab 29 Tunnan which flew for the first time in 1948. He became major general (the head) of the Royal Swedish Air Force Materiel Administration.

Lars Brising was the son of art historian Harald Brising. He underwent flight training in the Swedish Air Force in 1936 and graduated from the Royal Institute of Technology (KTH) in 1938. He worked at the Royal Swedish Air Force Materiel Administration 1938–1939 and then became designer at Götaverken's aviation department in 1939 and was active at Valtion lentokonetehdas in Finland 1940. Brising was then flight test manager at Saab 1940–1941, section manager at the Royal Swedish Air Force Materiel Administration design office 1941–1943.

He became technical manager of Saab's flight test department in 1943, became project engineer in 1945, construction manager for jet aircraft in 1946, chief engineer for construction in 1949, head of the aeronautics department in 1952 and director in 1954.

He became major general at the Royal Swedish Air Force Materiel Administration in 1965 and was its head 1967–1968. As head of the Royal Swedish Air Force Materiel Administration, he was also a member of Administration Board of the Swedish Armed Forces.

Brising was CEO for Svenska Utvecklings AB (a governmental tech and business development company) 1968–1975.

Brising became a member of the Royal Swedish Academy of Engineering Sciences in 1956 and of the Royal Swedish Academy of War Sciences in 1964. He was promoted to technology honorary doctor at KTH in 1974.

== See also ==
- Saab 29 Tunnan
- Saab AB
