= Karl Segrell =

Swedish Navy officer (1908–1976)

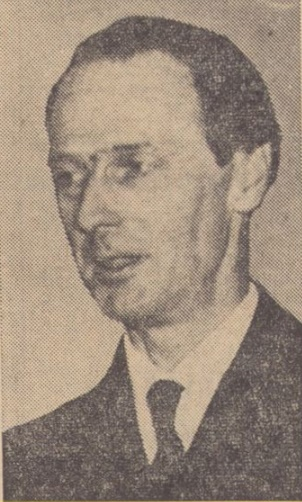
- Segrell as captain.
- Born: Karl Gustaf Segrell; 16 June 1908; Karlskrona, Sweden
- Died: 24 June 1976 (aged 68); Barkåkra, Sweden
- Military career
- Allegiance: Sweden
- Branch: Swedish Navy
- Service years: 1929–1971
- Rank: Vice Admiral
- Commands: Paymaster General, Swedish Navy; Swedish Naval Quartermaster Corps; Quartermaster Administration of the Swedish Armed Forces

Vice Admiral Karl Gustaf Segrell (16 June 1908 – 24 June 1976) was a Swedish Navy officer. Segrell senior commands included the posts of Paymaster General, Swedish Navy and head of the Swedish Naval Quartermaster Corps from 1963 to 1965 and as head of the Quartermaster Administration of the Swedish Armed Forces from 1965 to 1968.

== Early life ==
Segrell was born on 16 June 1908 in Royal Karlskrona Admiralty Parish, Karlskrona, Sweden the son of Rikard Segrell, a head teacher, and his wife Gertrud Lindman. He was brother of civil servant Torsten Segrell. Karl Segrell passed studentexamen in Karlskrona in 1926.

== Career ==
Segrell graduated from the Royal Swedish Naval Academy in 1929 and was commissioned as a marinunderintendent the same year, after which he was promoted to 2nd class naval store officer (marinintendent av andra graden) in 1932 and to sub-lieutenant (löjtnant) in the Swedish Naval Quartermaster Corps in 1937. He served on the coastal defence ship HSwMS Gustaf V and on the armored cruiser HSwMS Fylgia during her voyage to India from 1931 to 1932, after which he was kårintendent in the Cabin Boy Corps (Skeppsgossekåren) in Marstrand from 1935 to 1936 and was staff quartermaster supply officer (stabsintendent) at the West Coast Naval District from 1937 to 1940. He was promoted to lieutenant (kapten) in 1939, and served as a teacher in administrative service at the Royal Swedish Naval Academy from 1940, was office head and director (byråchef) in the Royal Swedish Naval Materiel Administration from 1941 to 1945. In 1945, Segrell was promoted to lieutenant commander. He then served as a naval expert in the 1945 Defence Committee (1945 års försvarskommitté). In 1946 he was promoted to commander and was an assistant to the Paymaster General, Swedish Navy (Marinöverintendenten) in the Swedish Naval Quartermaster Corps from 1946 to 1948, whereupon he served on the cruiser HSwMS Tre Kronor. From 1949 to 1951, Segrell served as staff quartermaster supply officer in the Coastal Fleet, after which he was head of the Office of the Paymaster General, Swedish Navy from 1951 to 1952.

In 1952, Segrell was promoted to captain, after which he was head of the Quartermaster Administration at South Coast Naval District from 1952 to 1961. He then served as Paymaster General, Swedish Navy and head of the Quartermaster Department in the Royal Swedish Naval Materiel Administration and also acting head of the Swedish Naval Quartermaster Corps from 1961 to 1963 as well as head of the Storage Room Bureau (Förrådsbyrån) in the Quartermaster Administration of the Swedish Armed Forces (FIV). Segrell was appointed Paymaster General, Swedish Navy and head of the Swedish Naval Quartermaster Corps in 1963 and two years later he was promoted to rear admiral and appointed head of the Quartermaster Administration of the Swedish Armed Forces (FIV). In his capacity as head of FIV, he was also a member of the Administration Board of the Swedish Armed Forces. He was also a member of the board of the National Swedish Board of Economic Defence from 1965 to 1972 and the board of the Swedish Army Museum from 1965. From 1968 to 1971, Segrell was head of the Swedish Quartermaster Matériel Department (Intendenturmaterielförvaltningen) in the Defence Materiel Administration, after which he transferred to the reserve in 1971 as vice admiral.

An obituary tells: ”Segrell realized early on the value of increased integration between the service branch administrations. Even before the guidelines for a reorganization of the Swedish Armed Forces' Defence Materiel Administration (Försvarets intendenturmaterielverk) were drawn up, he pleaded as director in the Royal Swedish Naval Materiel Administration for the establishment of a common storage room organization for the service branches. Preparations were made for joint nomenclature, data accounting, etc. Segrell was, often under strong opposition from various quarters, the driving force in the reorganization and downsizing of the Quartermaster Administration of the Swedish Armed Forces and its incorporation into the Defence Materiel Administration.”

== Personal life ==
In 1932, Segrell married Gertrud Lönner (1905–1996), the daughter of Arthur Lönner and Nanna Svensson. He had two daughters; Margareta and Monica.

== Death ==
Segrell died on 24 June 1976 in his home in Vejbystrand, Barkåkra Parish, Kristianstad County, Sweden. He was interred on 10 September 1976 in the Old Cemetery at Barkåkra Church, Ängelholm Municipality.

== Dates of rank ==
- 1929 – Marinunderintendent
- 1932 – 2nd Class Naval Store Officer (Marinintendent av andra graden)
- 1937 – Sub-lieutenant
- 1939 – Lieutenant
- 1945 – Lieutenant commander
- 1946 – Commander
- 1952 – Captain
- 1965 – Rear admiral
- 1971 – Vice admiral

== Awards and decorations ==
=== Swedish ===
- (Sweden) Commander Grand Cross of the Order of the Sword (5 June 1971)
- (Sweden) Commander 1st Class of the Order of the Sword (6 June 1962)
- (Sweden) Commander of the Order of the Sword (6 June 1959)
- (Sweden) Knight First Class of the Order of the Sword (1946)
- (Sweden) Knight of the Vasaorden (1948)

=== Foreign ===
- (Norway) Commander with Star of the Order of St. Olav (1 July 1971)

== Honours ==
- Member of the Royal Swedish Society of Naval Sciences (1950 honorary member in 1965)
- Member of the Royal Swedish Academy of War Sciences (1966)

Military offices
Preceded by Himself as Acting	Paymaster General, Swedish Navy Swedish Naval Quartermaster Corps; 1963–1965	Succeeded by None
Preceded by Sam Myhrman	Quartermaster Administration of the Swedish Armed Forces; 1965–1968	Succeeded by None
