= List of quartermaster corps =

Following is a list of quartermaster corps, military units, active and defunct, with logistics duties:

- Egyptian Army Quartermaster Corps - see Structure of the Egyptian Army
- Hellenic Army Quartermaster Corps (Σώμα Φροντιστών) - see Structure of the Hellenic Army
- Swedish Army Quartermaster Corps, created in 1880, amalgamated into the Quartermaster Corps of the Swedish Armed Forces in 1966
- Swedish Naval Quartermaster Corps, created in 1903, amalgamated into the Quartermaster Corps of the Swedish Armed Forces in 1966
  - Quartermaster Corps of the Swedish Armed Forces, established in 1966, then amalgamated into the Commissary Corps of the Swedish Armed Forces in 1973
- Quartermaster Corps (United States Army), established in 1775 and the United States Army's oldest logistics branch

== See also ==
- List of quartermaster units of the United States Army
- Quartermaster Corps FC, a South Korean military soccer team, a predecessor of Gimcheon Sangmu FC
- Quartermaster (disambiguation)
- "The Quartermaster's Store", traditional English song, also known as "The Quartermaster Corps" or "The Quartermaster's Corps"
