= FIV (disambiguation) =

FIV most commonly refers to feline immunodeficiency virus, a species of virus.

FIV could also refer to:

- Italian Sailing Federation, sports governing body
- Quartermaster Administration of the Swedish Armed Forces, Swedish government agency from 1963 to 1968
- Five Star Airlines, a former airline based in Massachusetts, U.S.; see List of defunct airlines of the United States (D–I)
