= Folke Herolf =

Swedish army officer

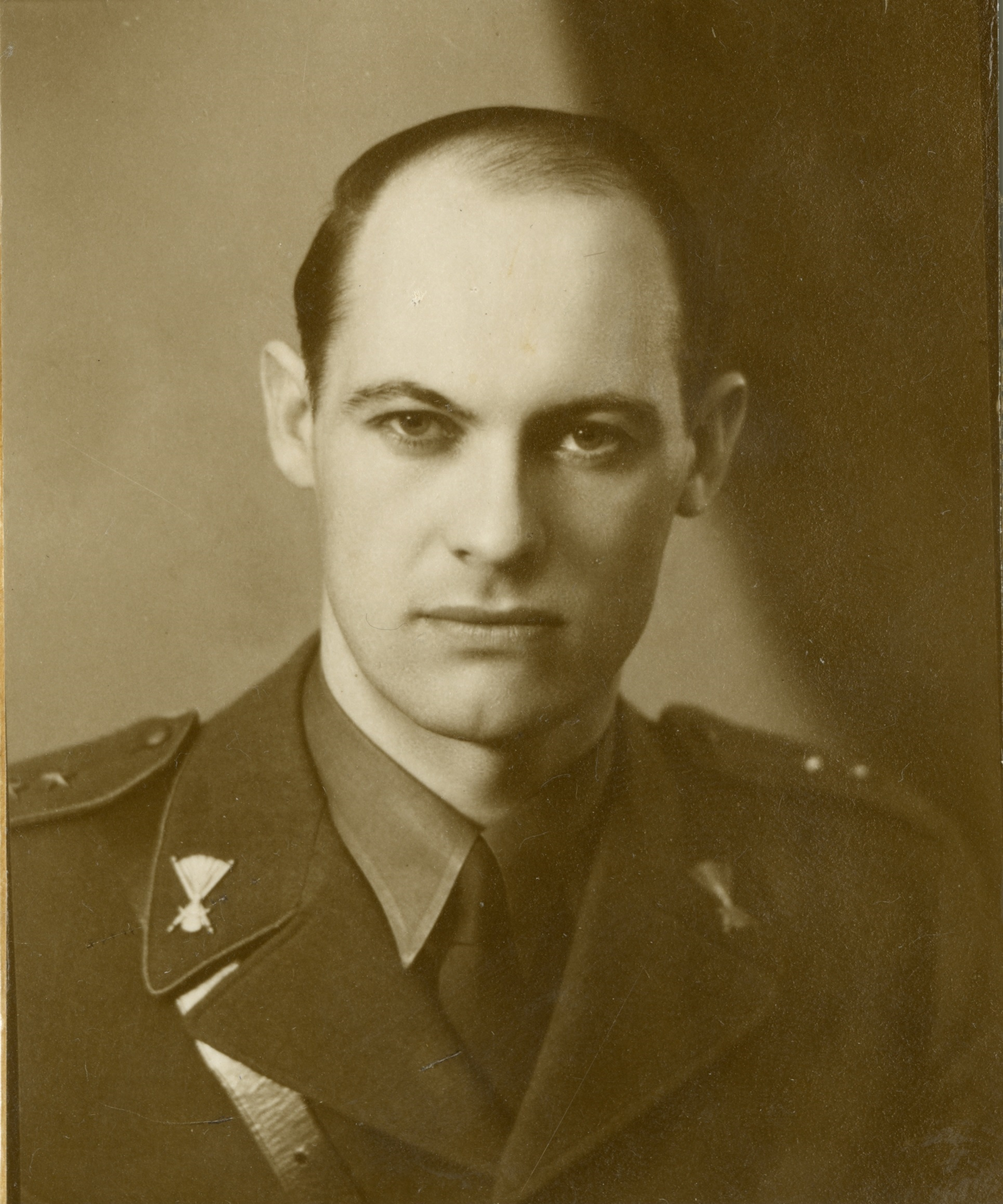
- Born: Folke Olof Ragnar Herolf; 11 November 1912; Hässjö, Sweden
- Died: 20 August 1982 (aged 69); Stockholm, Sweden
- Military career
- Allegiance: Sweden
- Branch: Swedish Army
- Service years: 1936–1973
- Rank: Senior Colonel
- Commands: Quartermaster Corps of the Swedish Armed Forces

Folke Olof Ragnar Herolf (11 November 1912 – 20 August 1982) was a Swedish Army officer. He served as commanding officer of the Quartermaster Corps of the Swedish Armed Forces from 1968 to 1973.

== Early life ==
Herolf was born on 11 November 1912 in Hässjö Parish, Timrå Municipality, Sweden, the son of Olof Nilsson, a chief engineer, and his wife Alfhild (née Fliesberg). He passed studentexamen in Sundsvall in 1932.

== Career ==
Herolf was commissioned as an officer and assigned as a second lieutenant to Skaraborg Regiment (I 9) in 1936. Herolf passed the quartermaster examination in 1942 after which he served regimental quartermaster in the Life Regiment Hussars (K 3) from 1942 to 1945. He was promoted to captain in 1943 and served in the Army Staff from 1945 to 1948. Herolf served as section chief in the Royal Swedish Army Supply Administration from 1948 to 1954 when he was promoted to major.

He then served as quartermaster in the II Military District from 1954 to 1957. Herolf was head of the Operating Section (Driftsektionen) in the Förplägnadsbyrån ("Catering Bureau") in the Royal Swedish Army Supply Administration from 1957 to 1958, promoted to lieutenant colonel in 1958 and was head of the Military Section in the Centralbyrån ("Central Bureau") in the Royal Swedish Army Supply Administration from 1958 to 1963. From 1963 to 1965, Herolf was chief of staff of the Head Office in the Swedish Army Quartermaster Corps, after which he was promoted to colonel in 1965 and served as head of the Food Bureau in the Quartermaster Administration of the Swedish Armed Forces from 1965 to 1968. In 1968, Herolf was promoted to senior colonel and served as commanding officer of the Quartermaster Corps of the Swedish Armed Forces from 1968 to 1973.

== Personal life ==
In 1939, he married Elisabeth Edlund (born 1915), the daughter of Torsten Edlund and Bertha Ström. They had two children; Madeleine (born 1941) and Dag (born 1945).

== Death ==
Herolf died on 20 August 1982 in Kungsholm Parish, Stockholm.

== Dates of rank ==
- 1935 – Second lieutenant
- 19?? – Lieutenant
- 1943 – Captain
- 1954 – Major
- 1958 – Lieutenant colonel
- 1965 – Colonel
- 1968 – Senior colonel

== Awards and decorations ==
- (Sweden) Knight of the Order of the Sword (1955)
- (Sweden) Swedish Military Sports Association's silver medal (Sveriges militära idrottsförbunds silvermedalj)

Military offices
Preceded by Folke Diurlin	Quartermaster Corps of the Swedish Armed Forces; 1968–1973	Succeeded by None
