= Wagon Master (disambiguation) =

A wagon master is the overseer of a group of wagons.

Wagon Master or wagonmaster may also refer to:

- Wagon Master (film), a 1950 film
- The Wagon Master (film), a 1929 Western film
- Wagonmaster (album), an album by Porter Wagoner
- The Wagonmasters (band), the backing band for Porter Wagoner
- 1st Cavalry Division Sustainment Brigade, nicknamed "Wagonmasters", U.S. Army
- Quartermaster of logistics transportation, also called wagonmaster

== See also ==
- Master of the wagon train
- Quartermaster (disambiguation)
- Master (disambiguation)
- Wagon (disambiguation)
