= Administration Board of the Swedish Armed Forces =

Administration Board of the Swedish Armed Forces (Swedish: Försvarets förvaltningsdirektion, FFD) was a Swedish government agency that existed from 1954 to 1968. It sorted under the Ministry of Defence and had the task of coordinating the activities of the Swedish Armed Forces' central administrative authorities.

== History and organization ==
The Administration Board of the Swedish Armed Forces was established on 1 July 1954. It initially had seven regular members: the vice chiefs of the Royal Swedish Army Ordnance Administration, the Royal Swedish Army Supply Administration, the Royal Swedish Naval Materiel Administration and the Royal Swedish Air Force Materiel Administration, and two other people. As of 1 January 1960, the number of members was increased to eight when the chief of the National [Swedish] Defence Factories (Försvarets fabriksverk) also becoming a member of the Executive Board. The chairman and the two additional members would have experience and skills in the field of business.

As of 1 July 1963, the Executive Board had the following eight members: a chairman, the chiefs of the Royal Swedish Army Ordnance Administration (renamed the Royal Swedish Army Materiel Administration on 1 July 1964), the Royal Swedish Naval Materiel Administration, the Royal Swedish Air Force Materiel Administration, the Quartermaster Administration of the Swedish Armed Forces and the National [Swedish] Defence Factories, and two other people. As of 1 July 1966, the chief of the Swedish Armed Forces Factory Board (Försvarets fabriksstyrelse) was a member instead of the chief of the National [Swedish] Defence Factories.

The Supreme Commander of the Swedish Armed Forces and service chiefs (Chief of the Army, Chief of the Air Force and the Chief of the Navy) could take over as members whenever they saw fit. If necessary, the heads of the Civil Administration of the Swedish Armed Forces Swedish Armed Forces (Försvarets civilförvaltning), the Medical Board of the Swedish Armed Forces and the Royal Swedish Fortifications Administration (Fortifikationsförvaltningen) could be summoned as members. The Chief of the Defence Staff also had the right to attend, as did the head of the National Swedish Board of Economic Defence (Riksnämnden för ekonomisk försvarsberedskap) when issues of war industrial planning were dealt with. From 1 July 1957, the head of the Swedish National Defence Research Institute could also be called up as a member. As of 1 October 1961, the Supreme Commander could no longer be a member. At the same time, the head of the newly formed National Swedish Board of Economic Defence was given the right to attend the dealing of issues concerning the board's area of activity, instead of the head of the disbanded Riksnämnden för ekonomisk försvarsberedskap. As of 1 July 1963, the service chiefs and the Chief of the Defence Staff could no longer be summoned as members, nor could the head of the National Swedish Board of Economic Defence be present. As of 1 January 1966, the Chief of the Defence Staff and the head of the National Swedish Board of Economic Defence were again able to attend the meetings of the Executive Board.

The agency's activities were regulated by the following instructions:

- King in Council's provisional instructions for the Administration Board of the Swedish Armed Forces, etc., Tjänstemeddelanden rörande lantförsvaret, serie A (TLA), 1954:41 (in force 1954-07-01–1959-12-31), with amendment in TLA 1957:53 (in force 1957-07- 01).
- King in Council's instructions for the Administration Board of the Swedish Armed Forces, SFS 1959:546 (in force 1960-01-01–1965-12-31), with amendment in SFS 1961:469 (in force 1961-10-01), SFS 1962:334 (in force 1962-07-01), SFS 1963:291 (in force 1963-07-01) and SFS 1965:406 (in force 1965-07-01).
- King in Council's instructions for the Administration Board of the Swedish Armed Forces, SFS 1965:832 (in force 1966-01-01–1968-06-30)

The Administration Board of the Swedish Armed Forces was amalgamated on 1 July 1968 into the newly established Defence Materiel Administration.

The Administration Board of the Swedish Armed Forces was located in Stockholm.

== Chairman and members ==
=== Chairmen ===
- 1954–1966: Christian von Sydow
- 1966–1968: Sten Wåhlin

=== Heads of agencies that were members ===
- 1954–1963: the vice chiefs of the Royal Swedish Army Ordnance Administration, Royal Swedish Army Supply Administration, Royal Swedish Naval Materiel Administration and the Royal Swedish Air Force Materiel Administration
- 1960–1966: the chief of the National [Swedish] Defence Factories (Försvarets fabriksverk)
- 1963–1968: the chiefs of the Army Ordnance Administration (renamed the Royal Swedish Army Materiel Administration in 1964), Royal Swedish Naval Materiel Administration, Royal Swedish Air Force Materiel Administration and the Quartermaster Administration of the Swedish Armed Forces
- 1966–1968: the chief of the Swedish Armed Forces Factory Board (Försvarets fabriksstyrelse)

=== Members with personal appointment ===
- 1954–1968: Hans Hagnell
- 1954–1962: Gustaf Sahlin
- 1962–1967: Lars Wirström
- 1967–1968: Harald Westling
