= Sam Myhrman =

Swedish Air Force officer

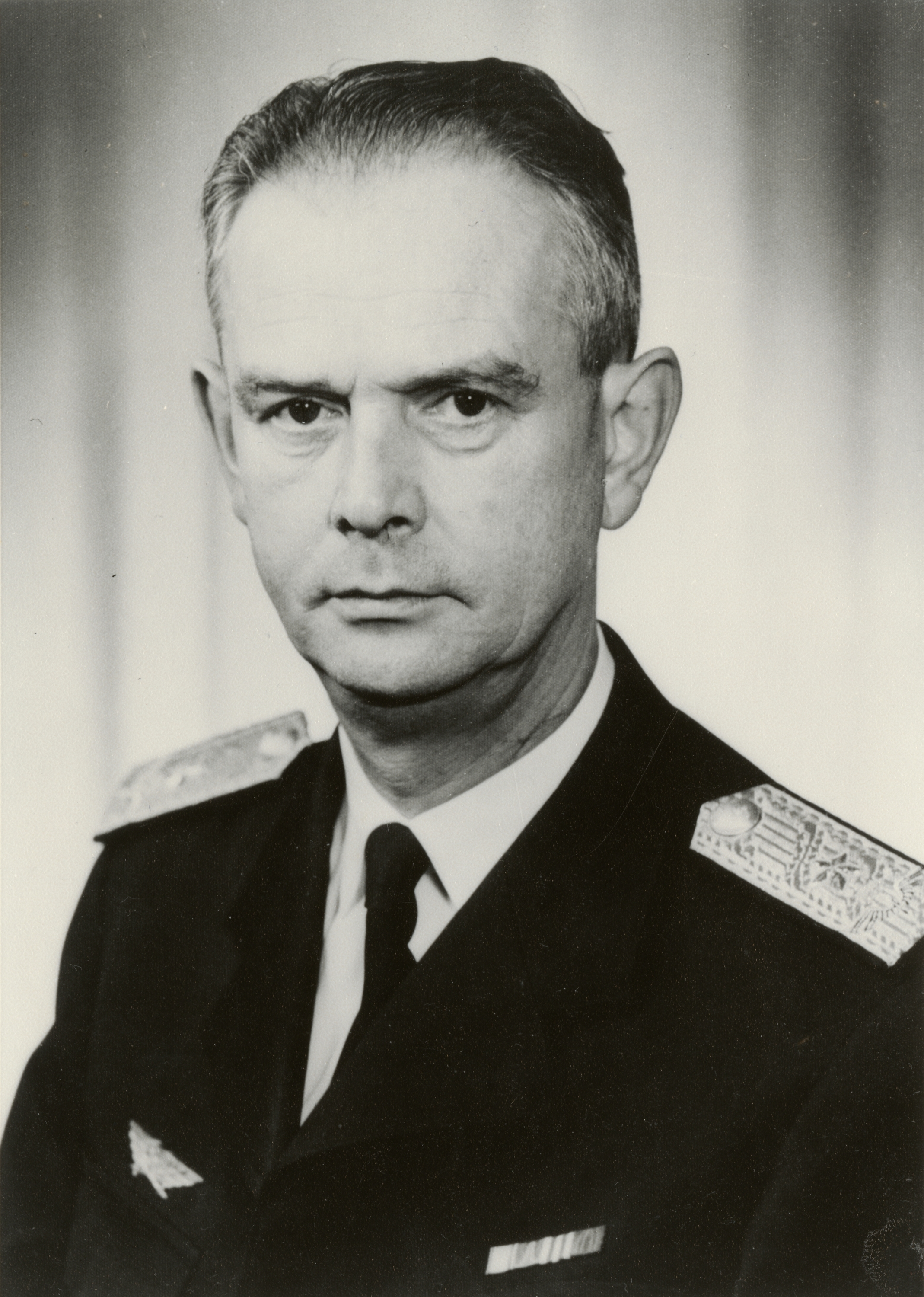
- Myhrman as major general
- Born: Sam Oskar Myhrman; 26 December 1912; Eksjö, Sweden
- Died: 3 February 1965 (aged 52); Lidingö, Sweden
- Military career
- Allegiance: Sweden
- Branch: Swedish Air Force
- Service years: 1935–1965
- Rank: Major General
- Commands: Vice Chief of the Defence Staff; Section I, Defence Staff; Swedish National Defence College; Quartermaster Administration

Major General Sam Oskar Myhrman (26 December 1912 – 3 February 1965) was a Swedish Air Force officer. His senior commands include the post of Vice Chief of the Defence Staff, head of the Swedish National Defence College and head of the Quartermaster Administration.

== Early life ==
Myhrman was born on 26 December 1912 in Eksjö Parish, Jönköping County, Sweden, the son of colonel Sam Myhrman and his wife Anna (née Kjelleström). He was the brother of physician Gustaf Myhrman (1903–1901), and the director of the National Swedish Labour Market Board's (Arbetsmarknadsstyrelsen) Defense Section, lieutenant colonel Bengt Myhrman (born 1905). One of his nephews were professor of economics at the Stockholm School of Economics, Johan Myhrman (1937–1997).

== Career ==
Myhrman graduated from the Military Academy Karlberg in 1935 and was commissioned as an officer in Svea Logistic Corps the same year with the rank of second lieutenant. He transferred to the Swedish Air Force where he was promoted to lieutenant in 1937 and to captain in 1942. He then attended the Royal Swedish Air Force Staff College and conducted staff service from 1942 to 1945 and the Royal Air Force Staff College from 1945 to 1946. Myhrman was appointed teacher at the Royal Swedish Air Force Staff College in 1946 and was promoted to major in 1948.

Myhrman was appointed head of the Air Staff's Operations Department in 1949 and was promoted to lieutenant colonel in 1952 and appointed teacher at the Swedish National Defence College the same year. He was promoted to colonel in 1955 and served as an expert in the 1955 Defense Committee (1955 års försvarsberedning). In 1956 he was appointed Vice Chief of the Defence Staff and head of Section I. Myhrman then served as head of department in the 1957 Defense Investigations. In 1960, Myhrman was appointed head of the Swedish National Defence College and two years later he was promoted to major general. From 1964 until his death, Myhrman was head of the Quartermaster Administration of the Swedish Armed Forces. In his capacity as head of the Quartermaster Administration, he was also a member of the Administration Board of the Swedish Armed Forces.

== Personal life ==
In 1938, Myhrman married Agneta Ljungberg (1917–1980), the daughter of captain Carl Ljungberg and Sigrid Hult.

== Death ==
Myhrman died on 3 February 1965 in Lidingö Parish, Stockholm County, Sweden. Myhrman and his wife are buried in Lidingö Cemetery.

== Dates of rank ==
- 1935 – Second lieutenant
- 1937 – Lieutenant
- 1942 – Captain
- 1948 – Major
- 1952 – Lieutenant colonel
- 1955 – Colonel
- 1962 – Major general

== Awards and decorations ==
=== Swedish ===
- (Sweden) Commander 1st Class of the Order of the Sword (6 June 1962)
- (Sweden) Commander of the Order of the Sword (6 June 1959)
- (Sweden) Knight 1st Class of the Order of the Sword (1949)
- (Sweden) Knight of the Order of Vasa (1952)

=== Foreign ===
- (Norway) Commander with Star of the Order of St. Olav (1 July 1964)

== Honours ==
- Member of the Royal Swedish Academy of War Sciences (1953)

Military offices
Preceded by Moje Östberg	Vice Chief of the Defence Staff; 1956–1960	Succeeded by Åke Mangård
Preceded by Adolf Norberg	Section I of the Defence Staff; 1956–1960	Succeeded by Sigmund Ahnfelt
Preceded by Gustaf Adolf Westring	Swedish National Defence College; 1960–1964	Succeeded by Oscar Krokstedt
Preceded by Hilding Kring	Quartermaster Administration; 1964–1965	Succeeded by Karl Segrell
