= Bo Ehnbom =

Swedish engineer (1899–1985)

- Born: 28 February 1899; Örtofta, Malmöhus County, Sweden
- Died: 13 February 1985 (aged 85); Lidingö, Stockholm County, Sweden
- Burial place: Southern Cemetery, Kalmar, Sweden
- Military career
- Allegiance: Sweden
- Branch: Swedish Army
- Service years: 1940–1964
- Rank: Major general
- Commands: Swedish Army Electrical and Mechanical Engineers' Corps
- Conflicts: Winter War (as volunteer with Finnish forces)
- Awards: Commander of the Order of the Polar Star; Knight of the Order of Vasa

Bo Karl Georg Ehnbom (28 March 1899 – 13 February 1985) was a Swedish engineer. From 1947, Ehnbom served as the head of the special technical section at the Weapons Office within the Royal Swedish Army Materiel Administration's Ordnance Department. In 1948, with the formation of the Swedish Army Corps of Engineers, he became a first-grade army director, holding the rank of lieutenant colonel. Ehnbom was a prominent anti-aircraft defence theorist, particularly focusing on the Bofors 40 mm Automatic Gun L/70 and the 12 cm gun's fire-control system. In 1958, he became the Chief of the Swedish Army Electrical and Mechanical Engineers' Corps and worked to modernize the training and salaries of army technicians. He retired in 1964, holding the title of civilian military major general in the reserve.

== Early life ==
Ehnbom was born on 28 March 1899 in Örtofta Parish in Örtofta, Malmöhus County, Sweden, the son of Harald Ehnbom, an engineer, and his wife Lilli (née Simmons). He had five siblings: two brothers, Nils and Kjell, and three sisters, Inga, Gun, and Viveka. Ehnbom obtained a bachelor's degree at Lund University in Lund in 1921, then pursued university studies in Hanover, Germany, and earned a civil engineering degree at KTH Royal Institute of Technology in Stockholm in 1925.

== Career ==
Ehnbom worked as a laboratory engineer at Platen-Munters' Refrigerating Company from 1926 to 1941 and during this time, he made several inventions related to refrigeration units and gas burners. In 1932, he established Electrolux refrigeration production in Berlin and in 1935 in Paris. In England, he conducted negotiations on refrigeration patents and gas burners. In March 1940, Ehnbom became a voluntary lieutenant for Finland during the Winter War and the commander of a Swedish 7.5 cm anti-aircraft battery near Turku. His involvement in Finland lasted just under two months, as a ceasefire was soon reached. Upon his return to Sweden, Ehnbom continued to work within Stockholm's air defence. He also played a role in recruiting and training civil engineers as air defence engineers.

In 1941, he became a contract-employed army engineer at the Stockholm Anti-Aircraft Artillery Regiment. During this time, he also worked as a teacher at the Anti-Aircraft Artillery Shooting School (Luftvärnsskjutskolan) in Väddö. In 1944, he joined the newly established Anti-Aircraft Artillery Department at the Army Staff as a civilian military anti-aircraft engineer. From 1 October 1946, until 1949, he also served as a teacher at the Artillery and Engineering College in material and construction theory. From 1 April 1947, Ehnbom was attached to the Royal Swedish Army Materiel Administration's Ordnance Department as the head of the special technical section at the Weapons Office. He was then titled as first army engineer. When the Swedish Army Corps of Engineers (Arméingenjörkåren) was formed in 1948, he immediately became a first-grade army director (armédirektör av 1. graden) with the rank of lieutenant colonel.

On 1 October 1951, he became the head of the First Weapons Office. Ehnbom was a prominent theorist in the field of anti-aircraft defence. Ehnbom placed high demands on versatility in instrumentation, particularly in the case of the Bofors 40 mm Automatic Gun L/70. Ehnbom also took an interest in the fire-control system of the heavier 12 cm gun. Soon, the era of missile weaponry arrived, rendering the heavier anti-aircraft defence obsolete. In the reorganization of the Royal Swedish Army Materiel Administration in 1954, Ehnbom became the arméöverdirektör and head of the Workshop Department in the Royal Swedish Army Ordnance Administration. Following a parliamentary decision in 1958, the Swedish Army Corps of Engineers merged with the master and technician personnel in the Tygstaten to form a new technical corps called the Swedish Army Electrical and Mechanical Engineers' Corps. As the arméöverdirektör, Ehnbom became the Chief of the Swedish Army Electrical and Mechanical Engineers' Corps on 1 October 1958. The Army engineers were managed by Ehnbom along with Gösta Cronvall, who was the head of the central section.

As the head of the military workshops, Ehnbom implemented a rationalization of the entire organization, which also led to the establishment of regional supply lines. He also ensured a qualified recruitment process for the army engineer organisation, allowing younger army engineers to be assigned to technical colleges. He also addressed the previously significant deficiencies in field repair services. Ehnbom was highly involved in modernizing the training of army technicians and improving their salaries. He achieved this, among other things, by relinquishing all responsibility for equipment maintenance and care until the authorities decided on an improvement. This improvement came through the 1960 mechanic training. Ehnbom retired on 1 April 1964, and was appointed as a civilian military major general in the reserve.

== Personal life ==
One 22 July 1933, Ehnbom married Thorborg Hedberg (1905–1940), the daughter of wholesaler Thure Hedberg and Ragnhild (née Sörensen Ringi), in the Oscar's Church in Stockholm. On 7 July 1947, he married Margit Hilton (1904–1998), the daughter of wholesaler Karl Hilton and Agnes (née Andersson).

== Death ==
Ehnbom died on 13 February 1985 in Lidingö Parish, in Lidingö, Stockholm County, Sweden. He was interred at the Southern Cemetery in Kalmar.

== Awards and decorations ==
- (Sweden) Commander of the Order of the Polar Star (6 June 1958)
- (Sweden) Knight of the Order of Vasa (1952)
- (Sweden) Stockholm Air Defence Association Gold Medal
- (Sweden) Stockholm Air Defence Association's Merit Plaque in silver (5 December 1941)
- (Sweden) Landstorm Sports Badge in silver (Landstormens idrottsmärke) (4 June 1937)
- (Finland) Finnish War Commemorative Medal

== Honours ==
- Member of the Royal Swedish Academy of War Sciences (1949)

Military offices
Preceded by None	Chief of the Swedish Army Electrical and Mechanical Engineers' Corps; 1958–1964	Succeeded by Carl-Gustaf Regårdh
