= Inger-Lena Hultberg =

Pioneering Swedish Air Force trainee

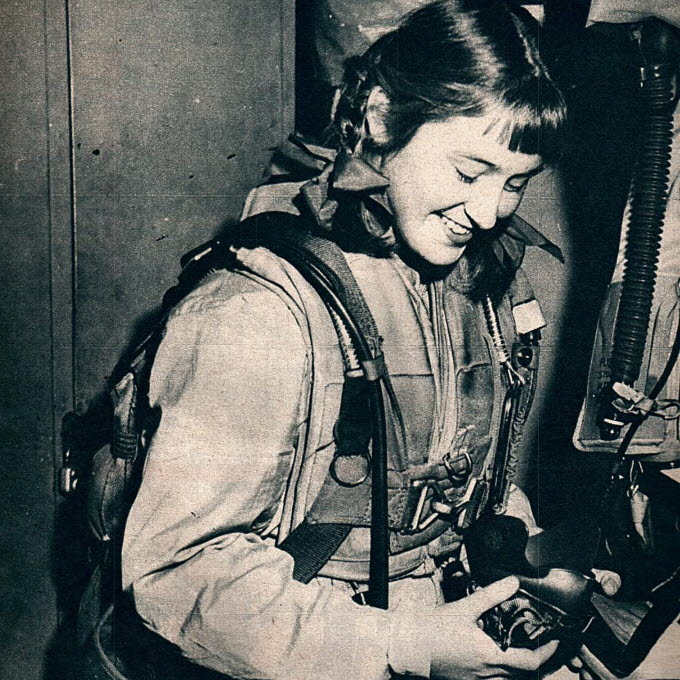
Inger-lena-hultberg

Inger-Lena Lamm, née Hultberg (born 27 December 1942) is considered to be the first woman in Sweden who volunteered for an education designed for those entering military service.

== Biography ==
Born and raised in Lund, Hultberg's father was a teacher and her mother, literary historian. She showed an interest in technology from an early age, specializing in maths at high school and working on a special project in aerodynamics. She was always interested in the family's car and motorcycles. While studying English in England, she spent her free time observing the planes at Croydon Airport and Biggin Hill, famous for its wartime activities. Her first flight was in Sweden in an old two-seater SK 16.

She then embarked on a course in physics at the Faculty of Engineering at the Lund University. In the summer vacation of 1962, she was the first woman to be admitted to the Royal Swedish Air Force Materiel Administration's workshop school in Västerås where she spent most of her time in the Swedish Air Force Maintenance Depot at Arboga training as a flight engineer. The only woman in a group of 30, she returned to the Air Force school for the summers of 1963 and 1964 qualifying as a flight engineer. But she realized she would never be admitted to serve in the Air Force. As a result, she decided to continue her academic studies, eventually graduating from Lund in mathematical physics.

Hultberg subsequently was employed as a physicist at the Lund University Hospital until her retirement in 2010.
