= Royal Swedish Army Supply Administration =

Swedish administrative authority, 1954 to 1963

Royal Swedish Army Supply Administration (Swedish: Kungliga Arméintendenturförvaltningen, KAIF) was a Swedish administrative authority which existed from 1954 to 1963. It sorted under the Ministry of Defence and had the task, in technical and economic terms, to exercise the highest management and oversight of the commissariat service of the Swedish Army.

== History and organisation ==
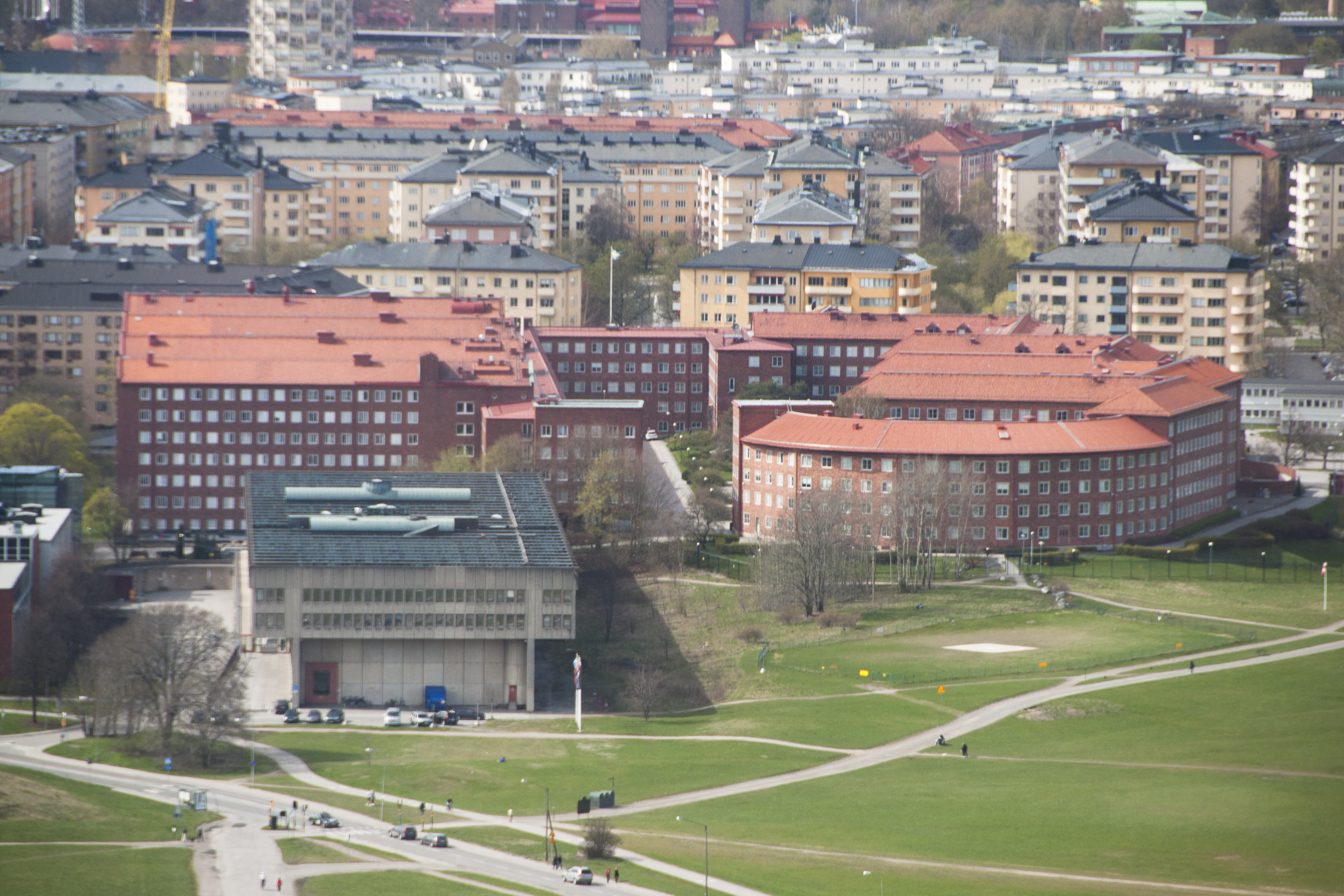
The authority was located in the Tre Vapen building in Stockholm, seen here from the Kaknäs Tower.

The Commissariat Department (Intendenturavdelningen) of the Royal Swedish Army Materiel Administration (KAFI) was reconstituted on 1 July 1954 as an independent agency under the name Arméintendenturförvaltningen ("Army Supply Administration"). After nine years of existence, the authority was on 1 July 1963 amalgamated into the newly formed Quartermaster Administration of the Swedish Armed Forces. (The Quartermaster Administration of the Swedish Armed Forces, in turn, was on 1 July 1968 amalgamated into the newly formed Defence Materiel Administration.)

The Chief of the Army was also head of the Royal Swedish Army Supply Administration. However, the closest command over the authority was exercised by a vice chief (souschef), who had the title of Quartermaster General. The vice chief was from 1954 to 1963 a member of the Administration Board of the Swedish Armed Forces.

The authority consisted of seven units from 1954 to 1959: Materielbyrån ("Equipment Bureau"), Förplägnadsbyrån ("Catering Bureau"), Drivmedelsbyrån ("Fuel Bureau"), Häst- och veterinärmaterielbyrån ("Horse and Veterinary Equipment Bureau"), Administrativa byrån ("Administrative Bureau"), Chefsexpeditionen ("Head Office") and Förrådskontrollkontoret ("Storeroom Control Bureau"). The head of the Häst- och veterinärmaterielbyrån ("Horse and Veterinary Equipment Bureau") was the Inspector of Army Veterinary Service. The head of the Administrativa byrån ("Administrative Bureau") was referred to as Krigsråd (military councillor). In 1959, the Chefsexpeditionen ("Head Office") was renamed Centralbyrån ("Central Bureau"), whilst Häst- och veterinärmaterielbyrån was amalgamated as Hästsektionen ("Horse Section") into the Centralbyrån ("Central Bureau"). Also Förrådskontrollkontoret ("Storeroom Control Bureau") was amalgamated into Centralbyrån. From 1959 to 1963, the units were thus only five: Centralbyrån ("Central Bureau"), Materielbyrån ("Equipment Bureau"), Förplägnadsbyrån ("Catering Bureau"), Drivmedelsbyrån ("Fuel Bureau") and Administrativa byrån ("Administrative Bureau").

The heads of the bureaus were members of the authority's board.

The authority's activities were regulated by the following instructions:

- King in Council's provisional instruction for the Royal Swedish Army Supply Administration, Tjänstemeddelanden rörande lantförsvaret, serie A (TLA), 1954:44 (in force 1954-07-01–1959-06-30), with amendments in TLA 1957:53 (in force 1957-07-01).
- King in Council's instruction for the Royal Swedish Army Supply Administration, SFS 1959:9 (in force 1959-07-01–1963-06-30), with amendments in SFS 1959:315 (in force 1959-07-01) and SFS 1961:473 (in force 1961-10-01).

== Activities ==
=== 1954 instruction ===
The authority's instruction of 1954 stated: “The Royal Swedish Army Supply Administration exercises under the King in Council in technical and economic terms, the top management and oversight of the commissariat administration in the Swedish Army." In addition, the authority was obliged:

to make arrangements for the army to be equipped with, for its combat readiness, appropriate and complete commissariat and veterinary equipment, and other supplies, as well as horses and dogs;

to ensure that the army's commissariat and veterinary equipment are kept in a timely and usable condition, that the army's catering as well as solid and liquid fuels are adequately maintained, as well as to ensure that storages belonging to the army or the Royal Swedish Army Supply Administration are in good standing and are well-stocked;

to establish drawings and models for the army's commissariat and veterinary equipment, insofar as such is not the responsibility of the King in Council or any other authority;

to manage the funds made available by the King in Council to the authority, as well as the other funds, which are subject to the authority's supervision and management;

to, in respect of the office of the Royal Swedish Army Supply Administration, exercise control over the management of the administrative affairs of the subordinate authorities, as well as ensure that an efficient management of funds and equipment and more takes place;

to conduct investigations and submit statements in cases, which are remitted by the King in Council or head of state department, to the authority;

to assist the Supreme Commander in drafting the proposals that affect the authority's field of work and which the Supreme Commander may find necessary to convey to the King in Council;

to submit to the Supreme Commander the opinions and inquiries which he may request and the authority may submit; and

to communicate to the Chief of the Defence Staff, the other central administrative authorities of the Swedish defense, as well as the Administration Board of the Swedish Armed Forces, the information which they deem necessary with regard to the tasks at hand and which affect the field of the Royal Swedish Army Supply Administration.

=== 1959 instruction ===
The authority's 1959 instruction stated: “The Royal Swedish Army Supply Administration exercises under the King in Council in technical and economic terms, the management and oversight of the commissariat administration in the Swedish Army." In addition, the authority was obliged:

to make arrangements for the army to be equipped with, for its combat readiness, appropriate and complete commissariat and veterinary equipment, other supplies required for the commissariat service as well as horses and dogs;

to ensure that the army's commissariat and veterinary equipment, as well as other supplies required for the commissariat service, are kept in a timely and usable condition and, as far as the office of authority concerns, monitor that the army's storages are complete and in good condition;

to, in respect of the office of the Royal Swedish Army Supply Administration, exercise control over the management of the administrative affairs of the subordinate authorities, also by ensuring, among other things, stock control, that an efficient management of funds and equipment takes place;

to establish drawings, models and designations of the army's commissariat and veterinary equipment, insofar as such is not the responsibility of the King in Council or any other authority; and

to in a manner specifically stipulated, handle matters concerning the army camp funds.

== Heads ==
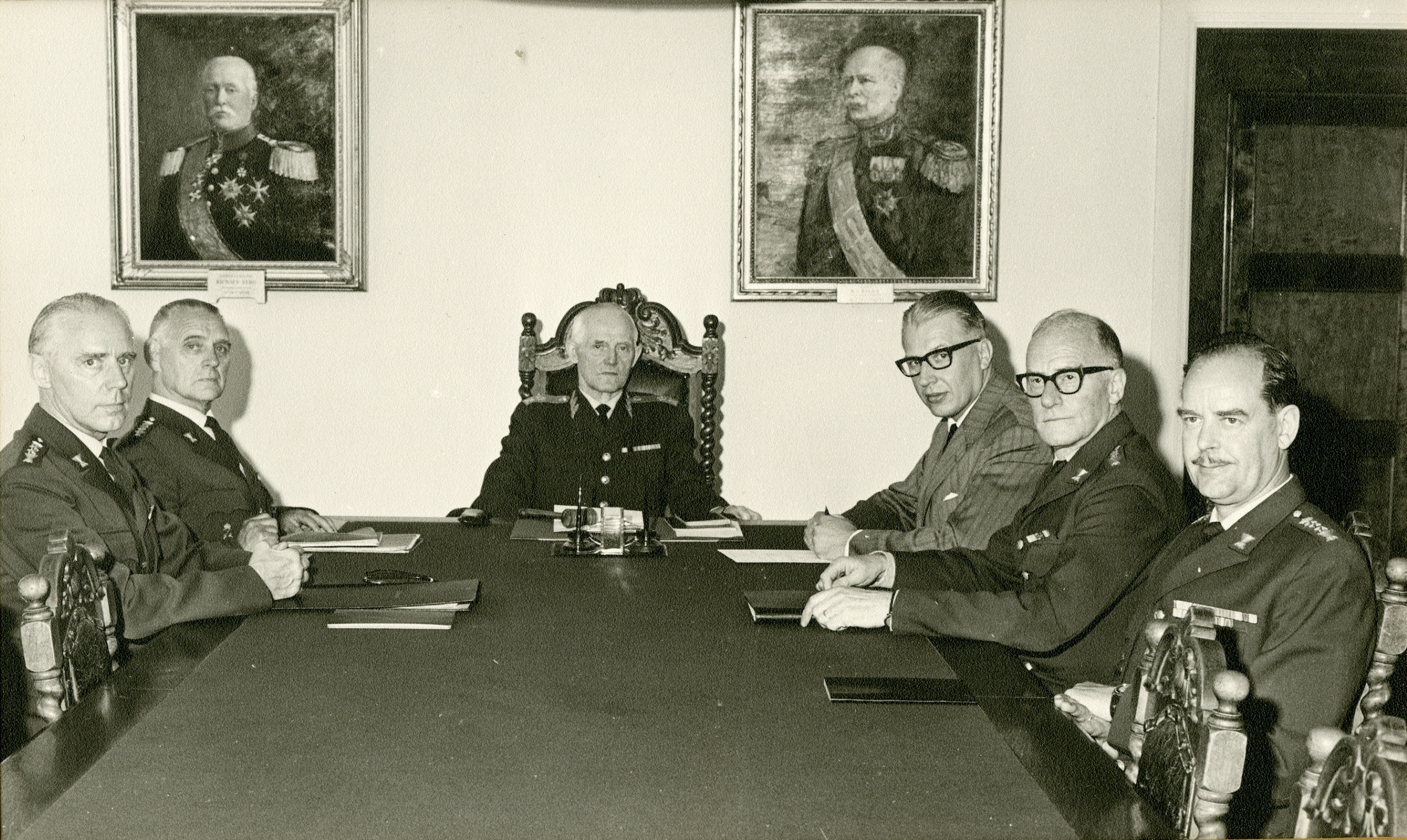
The last plenary session of the Royal Swedish Army Supply Administration on 28 June 1963. From left to right: Stig Leijonhufvud, Folke Diurlin, Hilding Kring, Åke Norrman, Henning Björkman, Helge Blomquist.

Quartermaster Generals and Vice Chiefs

- 1954–1957: Major General Ivar Gewert
- 1957–1963: Major General Hilding Kring

Chief of Staff of the Quartermaster General at Chefsexpeditionen ("Head Office") (from 1959 the Centralbyrån ("Central Bureau")

- 1954–1963: Lieutenant Colonel Stig Leijonhufvud (promoted to colonel in 1958)

Heads of the Materielbyrån ("Equipment Bureau")

- 1954–1957: Colonel Ivan Modigh
- 1957–1963: Colonel Folke Diurlin

Heads of the Förplägnadsbyrån ("Catering Bureau")

- 1954–1959: Colonel Per Odensjö
- 1959–1963: Colonel Henning Björkman

Heads of the Drivmedelsbyrån ("Fuel Bureau")

- 1954–1961: Colonel Valdemar Swedenborg
- 1961–1963: Colonel Helge Blomquist

Heads of the Häst- och veterinärmaterielbyrån ("Horse and Veterinary Equipment Bureau")

- 1954–1957: Inspector of Army Veterinary Service Erik Liljefors
- 1957–1959: Inspector of Army Veterinary Service Gunnar Krantz

Heads of the Administrativa byrån ("Administrative Bureau")

- 1954–1955: Krigsråd (military councillor) Tage Östergren
- 1955–1957: Krigsråd Einar Nylander (died on 13 November 1957)
- 1958–1963: Krigsråd Åke Norrman

Heads of the Förrådskontrollkontoret ("Storeroom Control Bureau")

- 1954–1959: Lieutenant Colonel John Hilding Wilén

== See also ==
- Royal Swedish Air Force Materiel Administration
- Royal Swedish Army Materiel Administration
- Royal Swedish Naval Materiel Administration
