= Commissary Corps of the Swedish Armed Forces =

- Försvarets intendentkår
- Active: 1973–1990
- Country: Sweden
- Allegiance: Swedish Armed Forces
- Branch: Tri-service
- Type: Administrative corps/Personnel branch
- Role: Ordnance
- Size: c. 300–350 (1984)

The Commissary Corps of the Swedish Armed Forces (Swedish: Försvarets intendentkår, Intk) was a joint administrative corps for ordnance officers of the Swedish Armed Forces which existed from 1973 to 1990.

== History ==
On 1 October 1973, the Swedish Army Ordnance Corps (ordnance officers) was amalgamated with the Quartermaster Corps of the Swedish Armed Forces. The new authority was named Försvarets intendentkår ("Commissary Corps of the Swedish Armed Forces"). At the Commissary Staff (Intendentkårsstaben), training and recruitment issues were mainly handled, personnel and service appointments, war placements etc. Entry into the Commissary Corps required the completion of training at the Swedish Army Quartermaster School (Intendenturförvaltningsskolan, IntS), from 1977 named Försvarets förvaltningsskola (FörvS). On 1 June 1983, the Commissary Corps was disbanded as its own authority and was reorganized into a section in the Defence Staff's Planning Staff, the Commissary Section (Intendentkårssektionen).

== Heads ==
- 1975–1980: Per-Eric Haglund
- 1980–????: Karl-Erik Gustafsson
