= Quartermaster (disambiguation) =

Quartermaster is a military position of responsibility, related to army (master of quartering) and navy (master of quarterdeck).

Quartermaster or quarter-master may also refer to:

== Places ==
- Quartermaster Canyon, Hualapai Indian Reservation, Arizona, USA; a canyon
- Quartermaster Formation, Texas, USA; a geologic formation
- Quartermaster Harbor, Vashon Island, Puget Sound, Washington State, USA; a harbor

== Characters ==
- Q (James Bond), the "Q"uartermaster in the James Bond 007 franchise, head of the "Q"uartermaster-branch
- Quartermaster (Pirates of the Caribbean), a fictional character from the franchise Pirates of the Caribbean

== Other uses ==
- "Quarter Master", a 2012 song by Snarky Puppy off the album GroundUP

== See also ==
- List of Quartermaster Corps, a list of active and defunct army quartermaster units
- Quartermaster Corps FC, a South Korean military soccer team, a predecessor of Gimcheon Sangmu FC
- Quartermaster general, an army position of responsibility in logistics
- Category:Quartermasters
- Wagon Master (disambiguation)
- Quarter (disambiguation)
- Master (disambiguation)
