= Swedish Army Electrical and Mechanical Engineers' Corps =

Maintenance arm of the Swedish Army

- Tygtekniska kåren
- Active: 1958–1983
- Country: Sweden
- Allegiance: Swedish Armed Forces
- Branch: Swedish Army
- Type: Administrative corps/Personnel branch
- Role: Electrical and mechanical engineering
- Size: 1,400 people
- Garrison/HQ: Stockholm, Sweden

The Swedish Army Electrical and Mechanical Engineers' Corps (Note: (BrE) the [Swedish] Army Electrical and Mechanical Engineers' Corps; (US) the [Swedish] Army Mechanics Corps.) (Swedish: Tygtekniska kåren, TygK) was an administrative corps of the Swedish Army established in 1958 consisting of electrical engineers and mechanical engineers. This administrative corps had over 1,400 members and played a crucial role in managing military technical personnel. The engineers held officer ranks, masters held warrant officer ranks, and technicians held non-commissioned officer ranks. They underwent extensive training, and promotions were subject to council approval. In 1983, the corps merged into the Swedish Army Technical Corps (ATK), marking the end of its standalone existence.

== History ==
The Swedish Army Electrical and Mechanical Engineers' Corps was formed on 1 October 1958, through a merger of the Swedish Army Corps of Engineers (Arméingenjörkåren) and the master and technician personnel in Tygstaten. The new administrative corps comprised over 1,400 individuals, whereas the Army Corps of Engineers consisted of only about 80 individuals. A corps leadership was established within the Royal Swedish Army Ordnance Administration's Workshop Department, primarily to handle master and technician personnel. The head of the corps leadership was Lieutenant Colonel Hammarström of the Swedish Armoured Troops. The army engineers were commanded by Gösta Cronvall, who was the head of the central section, along with the chief of the Swedish Army Electrical and Mechanical Engineers' Corps (arméöverdirektören). All appointments, promotions, etc., were presented to the Chief of the Army and decided by the meeting of the Council of State, King in Council.

All personnel within the corps (chiefs, engineers, etc.) were civilian-military personnel equivalent to military personnel and held service classes named after military ranks. Technical personnel were divided into engineers, masters, and technicians. Engineers held officer ranks, masters held warrant officer ranks, and technicians held non-commissioned officer ranks. Army engineers in the motor branch were required to undergo 21 months of training, including a seven-month preparatory platoon leader school (FPCS) in a logistics unit, an eight-month platoon leader school (PCS), and six-month at the Swedish Army Engineer Cadet School (Arméingenjörkadettskolan, AingKS), all of which were conducted at the Swedish Ordnance Administration School (Tygförvaltningsskolan, TygS). In the signal, radar, and weapons branches, army engineers were hired if they had completed specialized training as conscripted signal, radar, or weapon technicians.

During the first year of employment, the army engineer held the rank of second lieutenant and was usually assigned a wartime placement to the same positions as conscripted personnel. Prospective army technicians and artificers underwent a twelve-month technical apprenticeship at Technical School I (TS I) and were then employed as assistant army technicians (furir's rank). After twelve months of practical service in units and completion of Technical School II (TS II), they were promoted to army technicians (överfurir's rank). Wartime placement could occur as a maintenance detachment leader within a battalion. After typically twelve years of service as assistant army technicians and army technicians, they were promoted to first army technicians (rustmästare's rank). Specially qualified army technicians could, three to four years after completing TS II, apply for a ten-month artificer course to be eligible for promotion to artificer (sergeant's rank). Later on, after approximately six years and without additional training, they could be promoted to first artisans (fanjunkare's rank) and possibly even first tygverkmästare (förvaltare's rank).

The corps commander was also the head of the Royal Swedish Army Ordnance Administration's Workshop Department until 1968. The Royal Swedish Army Ordnance Administration was reorganized on 1 July 1968, when it was merged with the administration of other branches of the defence and formed the new authority called the Swedish Defence Materiel Administration (FMV), which was civilian and directly under the Swedish government. The Chief of the Swedish Army Electrical and Mechanical Engineers' Corps now became the head of the newly established Maintenance Department within FMV-A. Within the Maintenance Department, a Training Section for the corps was established with armédirektören av 1. graden Gösta Cronvall as its head. The official name of the corps' staff within FMV was the Personnel and Training Office (Personal och utbildningskontoret, FMV-A:UU), located at Sandhamnsgatan 51 in Stockholm.

The corps was amalgamated into the Swedish Army Technical Corps (Arméns tekniska kår, ATK) on 1 June 1983.

== Heads ==
The Chief of the Swedish Army Electrical and Mechanical Engineers' Corps held the title of arméöverdirektör (Note: Arméöverdirektör is translated as Chief of the Swedish Army Electrical and Mechanical Engineers' Corps, as the Inspector of the [Swedish] Army Matériel Field Repairs. or as the Inspector of Army Materiel Field Maintenance (Engineers).) with the rank of colonel, and was also the head of the Royal Swedish Army Ordnance Administration's Workshop Department. The Royal Swedish Army Ordnance Administration was reorganized on 1 July 1968, when it was merged with the administrations of other branches of the defence and formed the new authority called the Swedish Defence Materiel Administration (FMV). The chief now became the head of the newly established Maintenance Department within FMV-A. Starting from 1 October 1976, the chief was titled as armédirektör av 1. graden and held the rank of senior colonel. The Chief of Section III in the Army Staff served as the deputy corps commander.

=== Chiefs ===
No.	Portrait	Name	Took office	Left office	Time in office	Ref.
1	Bo Ehnbom	Colonel; Bo Ehnbom (1899–1985)	1 October 1958	30 March 1964	5 years, 182 days	
2	Carl-Gustaf Regårdh	Colonel; Carl-Gustaf Regårdh (1921–2009)	1 April 1964	31 March 1976	11 years, 365 days	
3	Börje Gahnberg	Senior Colonel; Börje Gahnberg (1923–2009)	1 April 1976	31 May 1983 (Note: On 1 June 1983, Gahnberg became the head of the subsequent authority, the Swedish Army Technical Corps (Arméns tekniska kår, ATK), serving in this role until 31 March 1985.)	7 years, 60 days	
