= Carl-Gustaf Regårdh =

Swedish engineer (1921–2009)

Carl Gustaf (Carl-Gustaf) Bore Regårdh (25 March 1921 – 20 March 2009) was a Swedish engineer. Regårdh had a distinguished senior career in the Swedish Army, starting as an engineer and progressing through various roles of increasing responsibility and rank. Noteworthy positions included serving as an assistant military attaché in Washington, D.C., where he facilitated technology transfers to Sweden. Upon returning to Sweden, he held administrative positions in the Royal Swedish Army Materiel Administration. He eventually became Chief of the Swedish Army Electrical and Mechanical Engineers' Corps, overseeing significant advancements in maintenance systems and advocating for technical education reform. After two terms, he transitioned to private business, where he conducted investigations for prestigious institutions and government agencies.

== Early life ==
Regårdh was born on 25 March 1921 in Helsingborg Parish in Malmöhus County, the son of Carl Regårdh and his wife Lilly (née Ohnell). Regårdh passed studentexamen in Helsingborg in 1941. He began his military career at the Karlskrona Coastal Artillery Regiment and became a second lieutenant in the Swedish Coastal Artillery reserve on 1 September 1944. After that, he pursued studies at KTH Royal Institute of Technology in Stockholm, where he obtained a Master of Science degree in mechanical engineering in 1948.

== Career ==
Regårdh served as an engineer at the Materiel Maintenance Office in the Ordnance Department of the Royal Swedish Army Materiel Administration from 1948 to 1949, and as a second-grade army engineer (arméingenjör av 2. graden) with the rank of lieutenant at the Gothenburg Anti-Aircraft Corps from 1 July 1949 to 1950. On 11 April 1950, he was already assigned to the Army Staff's Anti-Aircraft Department in Stockholm and was appointed as a first-grade army engineer (arméingenjör av 1. graden) with the rank of captain on 1 October 1951. Regårdh also served as a teacher in materiel science (fire control doctrine) at the Anti-Aircraft Officer School (Luftvärnsofficersskolan) from 1951 to 1954. He later joined the Royal Swedish Army Materiel Administration's Ordnance Department, where he was assigned to the Fire Control Section of the First Weapons Office (Första vapenbyrån), starting on 1 October 1953. Afterwards, Regårdh served as a section chief at the Ordnance Department in the Royal Swedish Army Materiel Administration from 1953 to 1954 and as a section chief at the Royal Swedish Army Ordnance Administration from 1954 to 1956.

From 1 October 1956, to 30 September 1962, Regårdh served in Washington, D.C. as the assistant military attaché at the Swedish embassy, a position held by army engineers. During that time, he was promoted (on 1 April 1958) to the rank of second-grade army director (armédirektör av 2. graden). As an attaché, he made an important contribution to facilitating the transfer of technology to Sweden, including new missile systems. Upon returning to Sweden, he resumed his service at the Royal Swedish Army Materiel Administration, this time as a senior administrative officer (byrådirektör). Starting from 1 July 1958, it was no longer permissible to hold civilian-military positions in departments other than the Workshop Department and the Materiel Inspection, which meant that Regårdh had to bid farewell to his civilian-military service. It was also not possible to enter the reserve of the Swedish Army Electrical and Mechanical Engineers' Corps according to the parliamentary decision in 1958. Thus, Regårdh became a conscripted civilian-military major. On 1 April 1964, Regårdh succeeded Bo Ehnbom as Chief of the Swedish Army Electrical and Mechanical Engineers' Corps. The chief held the title of arméöverdirektör with the rank of colonel, and was also the head of the Royal Swedish Army Ordnance Administration's Workshop Department.

Regårdh was the head of the Maintenance Department in the Army Material Administration (which was renamed the Main Department for Army Materiel in 1972) at the Swedish Defence Materiel Administration (FMV) from 1968 to 1976. Under his leadership, a modern computer-based maintenance system was introduced at FMV, allowing for the first time an overview of the status and costs of equipment maintenance. Modern methods and resources were also introduced at the army's regiments to streamline maintenance and training. He strongly advocated for the establishment of a joint school for all technical branches in 1977: the Swedish Army Technical School (Arméns tekniska skola). He proposed that it should be co-located with the Svea Engineer Regiment in Almnäs, Södertälje Municipality, but despite his vigorous protests, the government decided to locate the school in Östersund.

The Chief of the Swedish Army Electrical and Mechanical Engineers' Corps was appointed for six-year terms. By 1 April 1976, Regårdh had served two terms. There was a rule that those who had served two terms and reached the age of 55 could receive a pension. Regårdh took advantage of this and transitioned to private business. Regårdh became the last to hold the title of arméöverdirektör. From 1976, Regårdh worked as a self-employed entrepreneur. He conducted investigations for various purposes, including for the Royal Swedish Academy of War Sciences, the Royal Swedish Academy of Engineering Sciences, the National Swedish Board for Technical Development (Styrelsen för teknisk utveckling), and the Ministry of Defence.

== Personal life ==
In 1948, Regårdh married Christina Andersson (born 1925), the daughter of Robert Andersson and Ellen (née Lindberg). They had six children: Stefan (born 1949), Cecilia (born 1951), Eva (born 1952), Ulrika and Monika (born 1956), and Patrik (born 1959).

== Death ==
Regårdh died on 20 March 2009 in Danderyd Parish, Stockholm County, Sweden. He was interred on 12 June 2009 at Djursholm's burial ground in Djursholm, Stockholm County.

== Awards and decorations ==
- (Sweden) Commander of the Order of the Polar Star (6 June 1968)
- (Sweden) Knight of the Order of the Polar Star (1964)
- (Sweden) Swedish Curling Association (Svenska Curlingförbundet) Merit Badge (Svenska Curlingförbundets förtjänstmärke, 1981/82)

== Honours ==
- Member of the Royal Swedish Academy of War Sciences (1973)

== Bibliography ==
- Regårdh, Carl-Gustaf; Lindgren, Henrik (1978). Teknologispridning från flygindustriell till annan verksamhet: studie för Flygindustrikommittén (Fö 1978:01) (in Swedish). Stockholm: Flygindustrikomm. SELIBR 425976.

Military offices
| Preceded by Bo Ehnbom | Swedish Army Electrical and Mechanical Engineers' Corps; 1964–1976 | Succeeded by Börje Gahnberg |
