= Swedish Naval Quartermaster Corps =

- Marinintendenturkåren
- Active: 1903–1966
- Country: Sweden
- Allegiance: Sweden Armed Forces
- Branch: Swedish Navy
- Type: Administrative corps/Personnel branch
- Role: Quartermaster
- Size: c. 60–80 people

Commanders
- Notable commanders: Henry Lindberg; Karl Segrell

The Swedish Naval Quartermaster Corps (Note: Translates as the Swedish Naval Quartermaster Corps or the Swedish Naval Supply Service.) (Swedish: Marinintendenturkåren, MintK) was an administrative corps of the Swedish Navy. The Swedish Naval Quartermaster Corps was established in 1903 through a parliamentary decision and operated from 1904 to 1966. It included various ranks of naval quartermasters and civilian personnel who performed both military and administrative duties in the Swedish Navy and the Swedish Coastal Artillery. Recruitment involved training quartermaster students, who needed to pass specific educational requirements.

Before the corps was formed, similar duties were handled by the Navy's civilian staff dating back to the 1680s. The structure was modernized in the early 20th century, with training for reserve quartermasters beginning in 1914. In 1937, the corps became a military unit, integrating training with the Royal Swedish Naval Academy and emphasizing logistics. The corps' responsibilities included supplying the naval forces with provisions, clothing, equipment, and fuel, as well as related procurement, storage, distribution, and general administrative tasks of an economic nature.

The corps underwent significant changes and modernization, culminating in its merger with the Swedish Army and Air Force quartermaster personnel in 1966, forming the Quartermaster Corps of the Swedish Armed Forces. Despite this merger, former personnel had the option to return to their original corps. Admiral Bengt Lundvall advocated for the reinstatement of quartermasters in the navy, leading to a return of many reserve officers to their previous roles.

== History ==
=== Civil–military corps 1904–1936 ===
The Swedish Naval Quartermaster Corps was established by a parliamentary decision in 1903. The corps, which was both civilian and military, consisted of a Paymaster General, Swedish Navy (marinöverintendent), first-class naval quartermasters (förste marinintendenter), and naval quartermasters of the 1st and 2nd ranks, as well as naval sub-quartermasters (marinunderintendenter). The corps also included quartermaster aspirants, students, and personnel employed at naval stations, such as auditors, vice auditors, sergeant majors (väblar), janitors, and the prosecuting counsel (advokatfiskal) stationed at Karlskrona naval station. The corps also maintained a reserve.

The quartermaster personnel, comprising 71 positions according to the 1912 records, were required to serve both in the Swedish Navy and the Swedish Coastal Artillery, either on land or aboard ships, in positions to which they were assigned. On land, their duties included both quartermaster and administrative/clerical work, while aboard ships they performed tasks assigned to staff and ship quartermasters according to the regulations in force at the time. Naval quartermasters of various ranks, as well as auditors and the prosecuting counsel, were appointed by the King in Council. The Paymaster General served as the head of the corps' personnel and simultaneously as the head of the Quartermaster Department within the Royal Swedish Naval Materiel Administration.

At each naval station, a chief quartermaster (chefsintendent) was responsible for overseeing the corps' personnel. Recruitment for the quartermaster corps was done through the admission and training of naval quartermaster students, who were required to have passed their studentexamen. These students were admitted by the head of the Ministry for Naval Affairs, based on recommendations from a commission chaired by the Paymaster General. After completing a one-year training course, suitable students were accepted as quartermaster aspirants and trained at a special naval quartermaster school to become quartermasters, with the option of permanent employment for two years or reserve service for one year.

Before the establishment of the Naval Quartermaster Corps, its duties were performed by the Navy's civilian staff, whose origins date back to the founding of the Karlskrona naval station in the 1680s. At that time, the administration of the stations was transferred to local authorities, whereas previously (before 1634), it had been entrusted to the Lord High Treasurer of Sweden, assisted by chamber councilors (kammarråd) and accountants, and after 1634, to the Admiralty Board (Amiralitetskollegium).

The Navy's civilian staff underwent many changes over the years. The final structure, established in 1874, included station quartermasters, secretaries, accountants, regimental clerks, chamber officials (kammarförvanter), auditors, overseers of various stores and facilities, cashiers, bookkeepers, clerks, auxiliary clerks, auditors, vice auditors, prosecuting counsel, sergeant majors, and janitors. In more recent times, employment as an officer required passing the final examination from a higher elementary school and demonstrating adequate knowledge of the relevant naval regulations through an exam at one of the stations. However, for positions as secretaries to station commanders, prosecuting counsel, and auditors, a degree qualifying the candidate for entry into the judiciary was required.

When the Naval Quartermaster Corps was established, most of the civilian staff transitioned into this new corps.

Training for reserve quartermasters began in 1914 after the outbreak of World War I. The first class graduated in 1916. The last class of naval quartermaster aspirants graduated in 1923, when the naval quartermaster school was closed. The 1919 Defence Commission had proposed that the training for naval quartermasters be restructured to align more closely with the curriculum of the Royal Swedish Naval Academy. This proposal was approved by the 1925 parliament, and in 1926, the first naval quartermaster cadets were admitted.

=== Military corps 1937–1966 ===
The joint training at the Royal Swedish Naval Academy effectively contributed to integrating the naval quartermasters with their counterparts in the naval and coastal artillery officer corps. The training was modernized in both military and professional aspects, laying the foundation for a new phase in the corps' history. A natural consequence of this was that the corps was restructured into a military corps in 1937. Another outcome was the belief within the corps that quartermaster services in wartime should better align with the tactics of the combat forces. As a result, the corps emerged as a pioneer in naval support services. This also became one of the reasons why the corps leadership advocated for further education at the Royal Swedish Naval Staff College in the form of a naval quartermaster officer course, which began in 1948 and prominently featured logistics. Around the same time, naval quartermaster service exercises were introduced for both regular and reserve personnel. The purpose of these exercises was to conduct war games during visits to bases and other support facilities to illustrate and improve war planning. Additionally, reserve officers received further training through captain courses. Consequently, the corps developed into a modern officer corps in a surprisingly short time, with members whose diverse training and experience made them valuable in various positions within staff and administration. The changing work tasks were also driven by numerous investigations regarding the scope of the corps.

On 1 October 1966, the Swedish Naval Quartermaster Corps, the Swedish Army Quartermaster Corps, and the Air Force quartermaster personnel were merged into the Quartermaster Corps of the Swedish Armed Forces. The Naval Quartermaster Corps (and the Swedish Army Quartermaster Corps) continued to exist for some time alongside the new organization, as reserve officers and non-commissioned officers remained in the old corps, although they no longer had their own offices.

The former Chief of the Navy, Admiral Bengt Lundvall, expressed several times his desire to reinstate quartermasters in the navy. He succeeded to the extent that the corps' reserve personnel—following the removal of the Naval Quartermaster Corps' reserve from the navy's organization—were offered the option to join either the navy's or the coastal artillery's reserves at their discretion. The majority of reserve officers, as well as former naval quartermasters who had left active service, have thus been returned or will return to their original corps. When the Naval Quartermaster Corps' regular personnel merged into the Quartermaster Corps of the Swedish Armed Forces in 1966, it consisted solely of officers who had graduated from the Royal Swedish Naval Academy.

== Heads ==
The commanding officer of the Swedish Naval Quartermaster Corps was the paymaster general, Swedish Navy (Note: Marinöverintendenten translates as Paymaster General, Swedish Navy or the director of the Swedish Naval Supply Service.). The following is a list of commanding officers:

No.	Portrait	Paymaster General, Swedish Navy	Took office	Left office	Time in office	Defence branch	Ref.
1	Efraim Dahlin [sv]	Efraim Dahlin (1848–1932)	6 November 1903	1908	4–5 years	Navy	
2	Henry Lindberg [sv]	Captain (Note: Lindberg was promoted to commander in the reserve on 31 December 1908 and was promoted to captain in the navy reservce on 17 October 1919 while still in office.); Henry Lindberg (1860–1944)	31 December 1908	1920	11–12 years	Navy	
–	Birger Maijström [sv]	Commander; Birger Maijström (1874–1933); Acting	1920	1923	2–3 years	Navy	–
3	Birger Maijström [sv]	Commander; Birger Maijström (1874–1933)	1923	1 January 1933	9–10 years	Navy	
4	Carl Ekman [sv]	Carl Ekman (1883–1966)	1933	1948	14–15 years	Navy	–
–	Jarl Bring [sv]	Captain; Jarl Bring (1896–1985); Acting	1946	1948	1–2 years	Navy	–
5	Jarl Bring [sv]	Captain; Jarl Bring (1896–1985)	1948	1961	12–13 years	Navy	–
–	Karl Segrell	Captain; Karl Segrell (1908–1976); Acting	1961	1963	1–2 years	Navy	–
6	Karl Segrell	Captain; Karl Segrell (1908–1976)	1963	1965	1–2 years	Navy	–
