= National Swedish Board of Economic Defence =

- Överstyrelsen för ekonomiskt försvar

Agency overview
- Formed: 1962
- Preceding agency: Riksnämnden för ekonomisk försvarsberedskap
- Dissolved: 1986
- Superseding agency: Överstyrelsen för civil beredskap
- Headquarters: Lindhagensgatan 80, 102 26 Stockholm

National Swedish Board of Economic Defence (Swedish: Överstyrelsen för ekonomiskt försvar, ÖEF) was a central Swedish government agency for the supply issues during war-time. The board was established in 1962 and replaced the National Swedish Commission of Economic Defence (Rikskommissionen för ekonomisk försvarsberedskap), a government agency established in 1928. An example of the board's operations was when it used state aid to guarantee the operations of the Swedish rayon factory in Vålberg. Svenska Rayon made viscose which is an important ingredient in, among other things, clothes. In 1986, the board was dissolved and the tasks were taken over by the National Swedish Board of Civilian Preparedness (Överstyrelsen för civil beredskap).

== History ==
During the World War I, the question of securing Sweden's need for supplies, the economic defense, was raised. It was investigated by a War Preparedness Commission which left the report in 1918. An Industrial Preparedness Commission was established in 1924. In 1926, the next report came on the issue that emerged in the establishment of the National Swedish Commission of Economic Defence (Rikskommissionen för ekonomisk försvarsberedskap) in 1928. During World War II, several war-time bodies were set up for special tasks in this field. In 1947, the National Swedish Board of Economic Defence (Riksnämnden för ekonomisk försvarsberedskap) was established in order to get a joint solution. This was transformed in 1962 into the National Swedish Board of Economic Defence (Överstyrelsen för ekonomisk försvarsberedskap; SFS 536:1961). It was in 1969 shortened to Överstyrelsen för ekonomiskt försvar, ÖEF (SFS 80:1969).

The board was organized in four offices and a planning section:

- Administrative Office (Administrativa byrån)
- Industry and Trade Office (Industri- och varubyrån), planned the production of strategic supplies, war production. Storage preparedness and war deliveries of goods as well as removal also belonged to the office.
- Fuel Office (Bränslebyrån), planned the supply of fuel and lubricants and was also the supervisory authority for the industry's oil storage obligation.
- Business Office (Affärsbyrån), handled cases concerning the purchase, storage and sale of goods which were emergency stored. There was also a cistern section.
- General Planning Section (Allmänna planeringssektionen) was a staff body.

According to the new instruction in 1966 (SFS 659:1965), the Fuel Office and the General Planning Section transformed into the Investigation Office (Utredningsbyrå). According to the new instruction in 1978 (SFS 291:1978), the agency should consist of:

- Coordination Office (Samordningsbyrå)
- Planning Department (Planeringsavdelning) with four offices, namely clothing, energy, chemical and metal and workshop offices
- Storage Department (Lagringsavdelning) with business office and storage office
- Administrative Office (Administrativ byrå)

There was also a Construction Office (Anläggningsbyrå) responsible for oil storage. In addition to this, there was a data section and an Information Secretariat (Informationssekretariat) in a kind of staff function. According to the new instruction in 1983 (SFS 762:1983), the departments were removed and the offices ended up directly under the management. According to the new instruction in 1986 (SFS 423:1986), the entire agency was transformed into the National Swedish Board of Civilian Preparedness (Överstyrelsen för civil beredskap).

== Directors General ==
- 1962–1966: Bertil Swärd
- 1966–1979: Sten Lundberg
- 1979–1986: Gunnar Nordbeck
