= Quartermaster Corps of the Swedish Armed Forces =

Former joint administrative corps of the Swedish Armed Forces

- Försvarets intendenturkår
- Active: 1966–1973
- Country: Sweden
- Allegiance: Swedish Armed Forces
- Branch: Tri-service
- Type: Administrative corps/Personnel branch
- Role: Quartermaster
- Size: c. 250 active officers

Commanders
- Notable commanders: Folke Herolf

The Quartermaster Corps of the Swedish Armed Forces (Swedish: Försvarets intendenturkår, Intk) was a joint administrative corps of the Swedish Armed Forces which consisted of quartermaster officers on active duty. It was established in 1966 and was amalgamated with the Swedish Army Ordnance Corps into the Commissary Corps of the Swedish Armed Forces in 1973.

== History ==
The Quartermaster Corps of the Swedish Armed Forces was established on 1 October 1966 (TLA 1966:39) through a merger of the Swedish Army Quartermaster Corps, the Swedish Naval Quartermaster Corps and the Swedish Air Force's quartermaster officers. The chief of the corps exercised, under the command of the Supreme Commander, the supervision and oversight of the corps. He was as chief of the Swedish Army Quartermaster Corps and the Swedish Naval Supply Service subordinate to the Chief of the Army and the Chief of the Navy. In addition, according to the Supreme Commander's order, he was responsible for the military positions of the Swedish Air Force's quartermaster officers.

The chief of the Quartermaster Corps of the Swedish Armed Forces was under the command of the Supreme Commander. The chief was, unlike other administrative corps chiefs (except the chief of the Swedish Army Ordnance Corps) full time involved with corps' tasks. The Swedish Army Quartermaster School (Intendenturförvaltningsskolan, IntS) was subordinated to the chief of the Quartermaster Corps of the Swedish Armed Forces. The chief would primarily represent the interests of the corps staff in different ways. The most demanding tasks were to conduct staff development, and evaluating staff development and promotion opportunities. In this regard, the chief was usually assisted by a head of a government agency where staff were placed for service. In order to be able to actively work in the environment where the staff were employed, the chief himself needed significant experience of this.

On 1 October 1973, the Quartermaster Corps of the Swedish Armed Forces was amalgamated with the Swedish Army Ordnance Corps into the Commissary Corps of the Swedish Armed Forces.

== Chiefs ==
- 1966–1968: Folke Diurlin
- 1968–1973: Folke Herolf

== See also ==
- Swedish Army Quartermaster Corps
- Swedish Naval Quartermaster Corps
