= Wagon (disambiguation) =

A wagon is a heavy four-wheeled vehicle pulled by draught animals.

Wagon may also refer to:

== Transport ==
- Automobile, including:
  - Crossover (automobile)
  - Minivan
  - Sport utility vehicle
  - Station wagon
  - Van
- Goods wagon or freight car, a railroad car used for transporting cargo
- Scenery wagon, a mobile platform upon which theatrical scenery is built
- Toy wagon
- Wagon Automotive, a British car parts company
- Mitsubishi Wagon, a passenger van marketed in the United States

== Music ==
- Wagons (band), an Australian alt-country band
- Wagon (instrument) or yamatogoto, a Japanese musical instrument
- "The Wagon", a 1990 song by Dinosaur Jr.

== People with the surname ==
- Daniel Wagon (born 1976), Australian rugby league player and coach
- Stan Wagon, Canadian-American mathematician

== Other uses ==
- Ursa Major or "the Wagon", a constellation

== See also ==
- West Anglia Great Northern, a former British railway company
- WAGN (AM), a USA radio station
