= Örtofta =

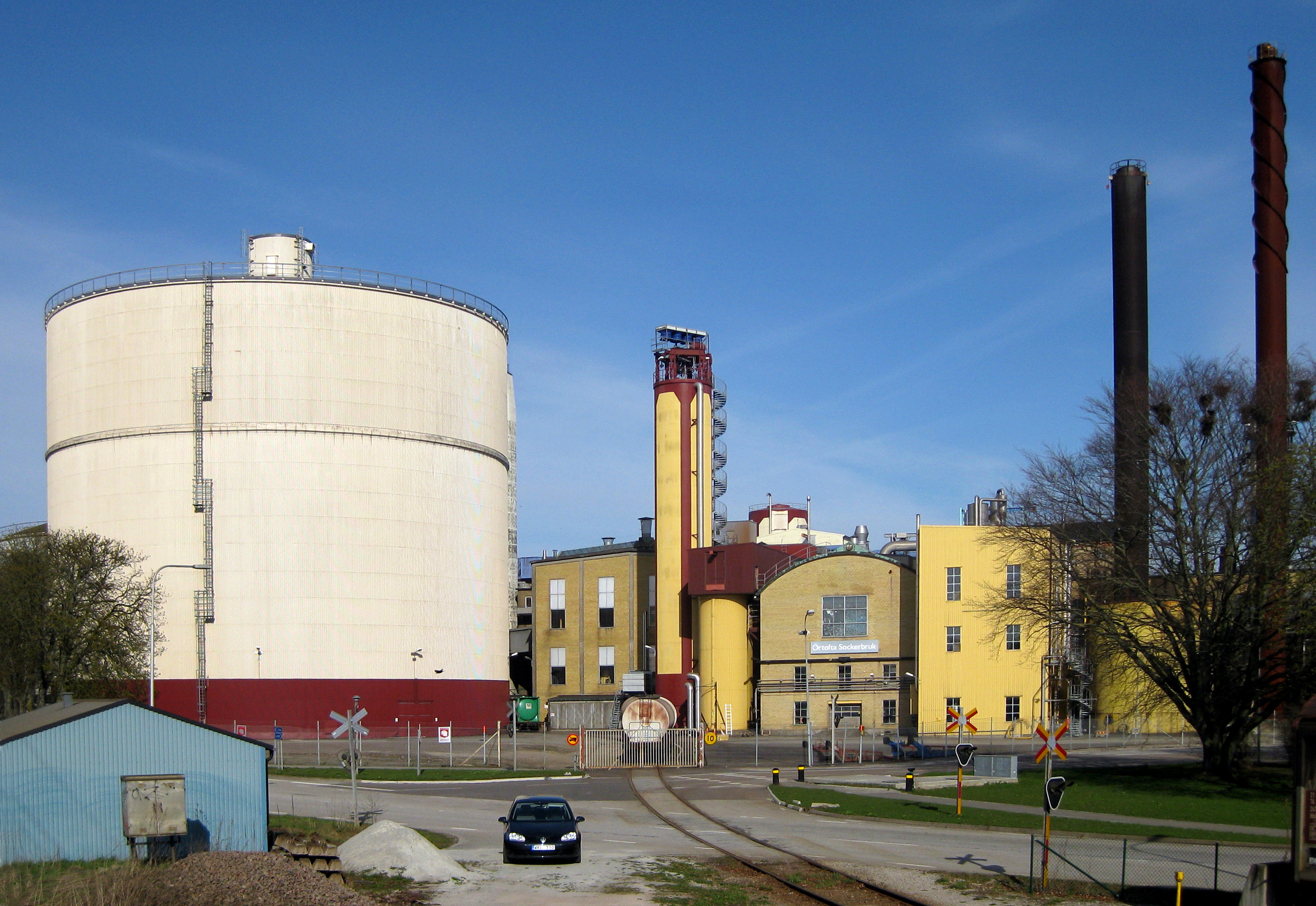
- Örtofta sugar factory

- Location within Skåne Location within Sweden
- Coordinates: 55°47′N 13°15′E
- Country: Sweden
- Province: Skåne
- County: Skåne County
- Municipality: Eslöv Municipality

Area
  - Total: 0.50 km^{2} (0.19 sq mi)

Population (31 December 2010)
  - Total: 202
  - Density: 401/km^{2} (1,040/sq mi)
- Time zone: UTC+1 (CET)
  - Summer (DST): UTC+2 (CEST)

Örtofta is a locality situated in Eslöv Municipality, Skåne County, Sweden with 202 inhabitants in 2010.
