= Quartermaster Administration of the Swedish Armed Forces =

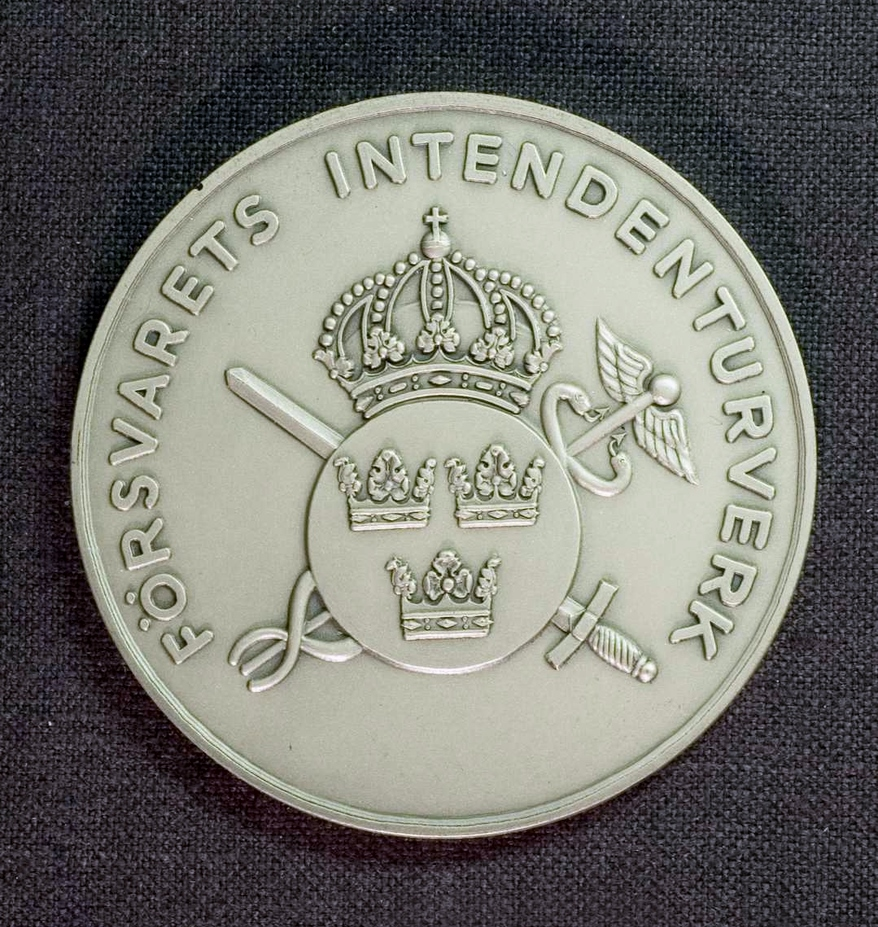
Commemorative medal of the Quartermaster Administration.

Quartermaster Administration of the Swedish Armed Forces (Swedish: Försvarets intendenturverk, FIV) was a Swedish government agency from 1963 to 1968, for the quartermaster administration of the Swedish Armed Forces. The agency had to meet the Swedish Armed Forces' need for commissariat and veterinary equipment, other commissariat supplies, as well as horses and dogs.

== History ==
The agency was established on 1 July 1963 by an amalgamation of the Royal Swedish Army Supply Administration, the Royal Swedish Naval Materiel Administration's Commissariat Department and the Royal Swedish Air Force Materiel Administration's Commissariat Bureau. The Quartermaster Administration consisted of five bureaus, whose chiefs were members of the agency's board. The bureaus were; Materielbyrån ("Supply Bureau"), Livsmedelsbyrån ("Food Bureau"), Drivmedelsbyrån ("Fuel Bureau"), Förrådsbyrån ("Storage Room Bureau") and the Administrativa byrån ("Administrative Bureau"). In addition, there were two independent units: the Centralplaneringen ("Central Planning") and the Normaliesektionen ("Normalie Section").

The agency's activities was regulated by the following instructions:

- King in Council's instruction for the Quartermaster Administration of the Swedish Armed Forces, SFS 1963:286 (in force 1 July 1963 to 31 December 1965), with amendment 1964:374 (in force 1 July 1964).
- King in Council's instruction for the Quartermaster Administration of the Swedish Armed Forces, SFS 1965:828 (in force 1 January 1966 to 30 June 1968), with amendment 1966:490 (in force 1 October 1966).

The agency had its office at Centralvägen 6 in Solna. The agency was amalgamated into the Defence Materiel Administration on 1 July 1968.

== Chiefs ==
Agency

- 1963–1964: Major general Hilding Kring
- 1964–1965: Major general Sam Myhrman (died on 3 February 1965)
- 1965–1968: Rear admiral Karl Segrell

Supply Bureau

- 1963–1968: Colonel Folke Diurlin (on leave 1965–1968)
- 1965–1968: Colonel Birger Ahlm (acting)

Food Bureau

- 1963–1965: Colonel Henning Björkman
- 1965–1968: Colonel Folke Herolf

Fuel Bureau

- 1963–1968: Colonel Helge Blomquist

Storage Room Bureau

- 1963–1965: Captain Karl Segrell
- 1965–1967 or 1968: Captain Gunnar Bachér
- 1968: Lieutenant colonel Ragnar Terning (acting)

Administrative Bureau

- 1963–1968: Åke Norrman

Central Planning

- 1963–1966: Colonel Stig Leijonhufvud
- 1966–1968: Colonel Hans Rundgren (on leave 1966–1968)
- 1966–1968: Colonel Folke Eggert (acting)

Normalie Section

- 1963–1968: Lieutenant colonel Sten Ahlklo (promoted to colonel in 1965)
