= Royal Swedish Air Force Materiel Administration =

Swedish government agency (1936-1968)

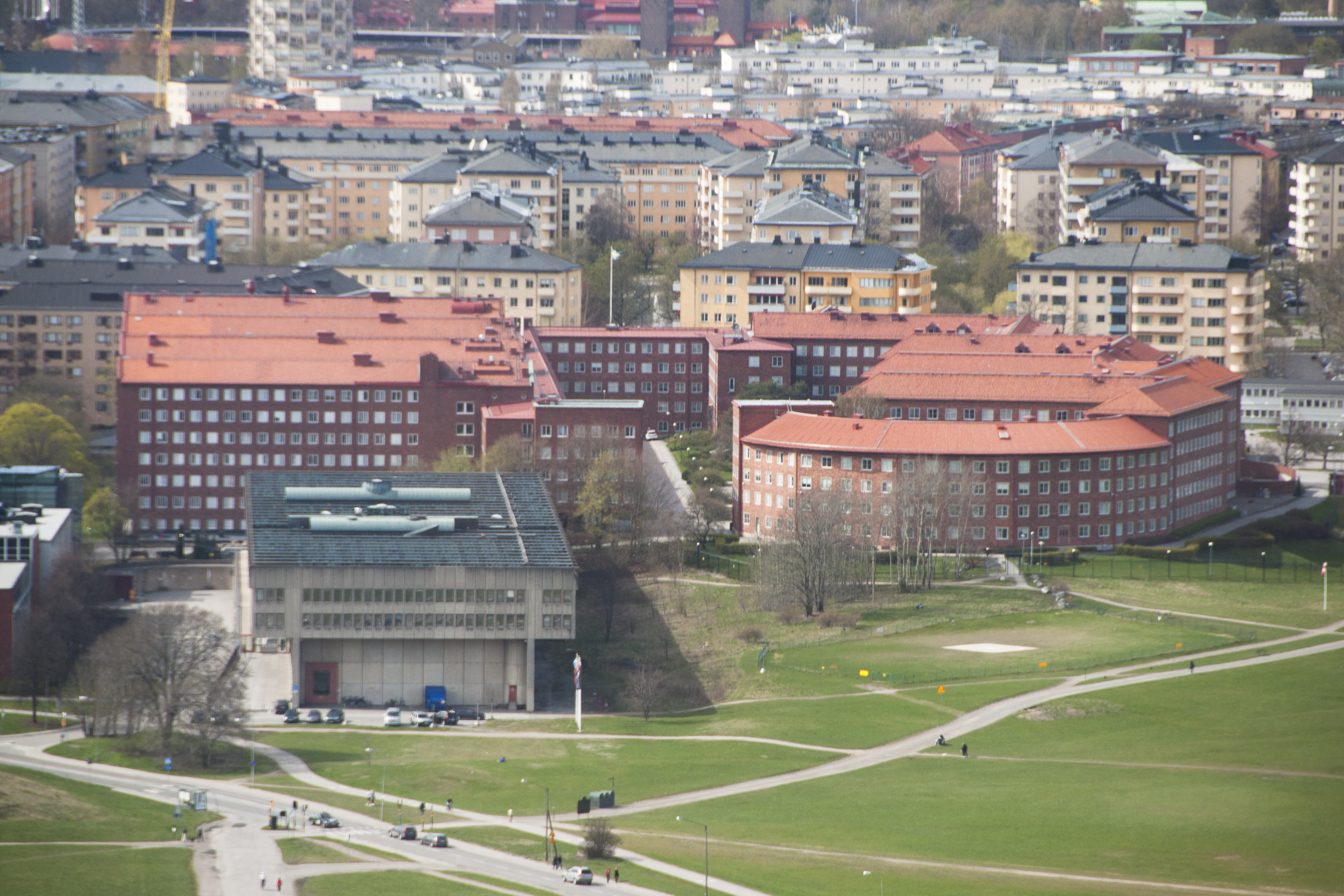
The agency was located in these red buildings at Banérgatan 62–64 in Stockholm from 1943 to 1968.

The Royal Swedish Air Force Materiel Administration (Swedish: Kungliga Flygförvaltningen, abbreviated KFF) was a Swedish government agency active between the years 1936 and 1968. The agency was amalgamated into the Swedish Defence Materiel Administration.

== History ==
The Royal Swedish Air Force Materiel Administration was established on 1 July 1936 with the task in technical and economic terms to exercise top management and oversight of the Swedish Air Force. The agency was first organized in the Materiel Department (1936–1954), Commissariat Department (1936–1954), Building Department (1936–1948, was merged with the exception of the Airfield Department (Flygfältsbyrån) into the Fortifications Administration) and the Civil Office (1936–1954). In 1948 the Airfield Department (1948–1963) became an own unit, and in 1952/1953 so did the Central Planning (to 1963) and the Personnel Office (until 1954).

A reorganization on 1 July 1954 established, in addition to the Airfield Department and the Central Planning, the following units: Aircraft Department (1954–1968), Electro Department (1954–1968), Maintenance Department (1954–1968), Purchasing Department (1954–1968), Commissariat Bureau (1954–1963, merge into the Quartermaster Administration of the Swedish Armed Forces), Normaliebyrån (1954–1968), Administrative Office (1954–1968) and the Material Inspection (1954–1960).

A special sub-unit within the Materiel Department for missiles, the Missile Defence Agency (Försvarets robotvapenbyrå), became in 1954 Robotbyrån within the Air Force Materiel Administration, in 1963 renamed to the Missile Department (Robotavdelningen) (shared by the Swedish defence as of 1962). In 1960, the creation of the Director-General of Engineering of the [Royal] Swedish Air Force (flygöverdirektören), who took over, among others thing, the tasks of the Material Inspection. The Air Force Materiel Administration was amalgamated on 1 July 1968 into the Swedish Defence Materiel Administration.

== Heads ==
=== Vice Chiefs ===
- 1936–1942: Arthur Örnberg
- 1942–1944: John Stenbeck
- 1944–1950: Nils Söderberg
- 1950–1957: Bengt Jacobsson
- 1957–1960: Torsten Rapp
- 1960–1961: Lage Thunberg
- 1961–1963: Greger Falk

=== Chiefs ===
- 1963–1967: Greger Falk
- 1967–1968: Lars Brising (acting)

== See also ==
- Royal Swedish Army Materiel Administration
- Royal Swedish Naval Materiel Administration
