= Swedish Code of Statutes =

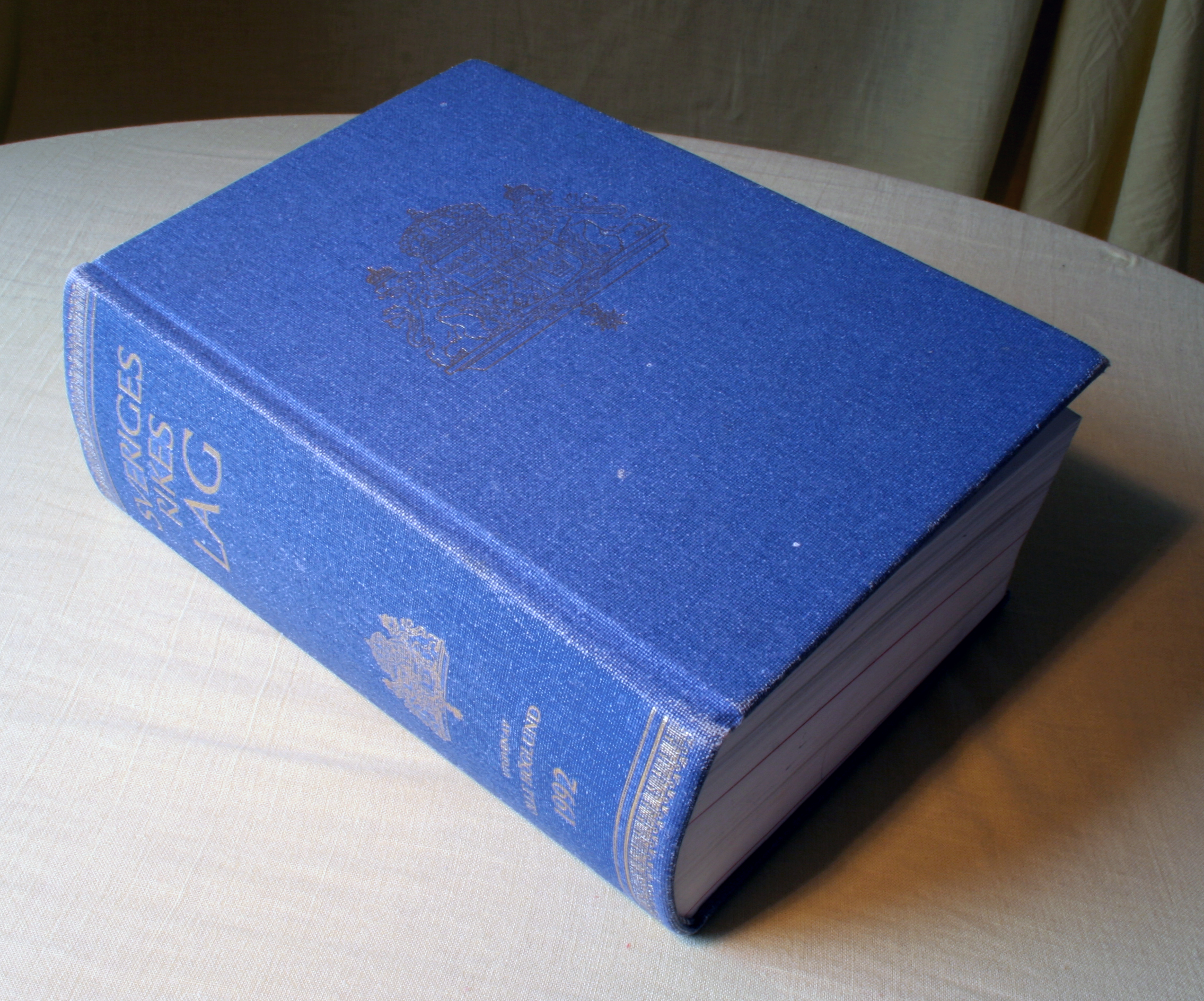
Sveriges rikes lag, the de facto statute book, containing a selection of current laws from the SFS

The Swedish Code of Statutes (Swedish: Svensk författningssamling, Swedish law collection; SFS) contains the chronological session laws of the Riksdag, regulations of the Government, and ordinances, collectively called författning.

== SFS numbers ==
Every document has an SFS number, including legislation amending already existing law. The number contained in the citation consists of a four digit year, a colon and then an incrementing number by year. For instance, the Instrument of Government is SFS 1974:152, with each amendment having its own SFS number. The amendments are usually referred to as (year:number) in the main law text.

== Consolidation ==
SFS is not a law code because it does not systematize laws into a single, coherent body like the United States Code or US Code of Federal Regulations. Though författning are reprinted, they are not regularly updated in the SFS like the Swiss Systematic Compilation of Federal Legislation (SR/RS). SFS is a chronological publication of laws and regulations, more like the United States Statutes at Large and Federal Register. Consolidated versions of författning can be found through a combination of official online sources, legal databases, handbooks, and certain official publications.

Sveriges rikes lag is an annually privately-published Swedish law book. It contains a selection of laws and other statutes in the SFS that are deemed to be of general interest. By tradition, the responsible publisher is usually a retired justice of the Supreme Court who has also been the chairman of the Supreme Court. Up until the 2010 edition, it was Torkel Gregow who had the assignment. From and including the 2011 edition, Johan Munck is the law book publisher. The book is published by the information publisher Norstedts Juridik. In its current form, Sveriges rikes lag has been published since 1861.

== History ==
The publication of SFS started in 1825. Before that, författning were collected in print under the concept of Årstrycket (Annual Print).

== See also ==
- Post- och Inrikes Tidningar (PoIT)
