= Jan Thörnqvist =

Swedish naval officer (born 1959)

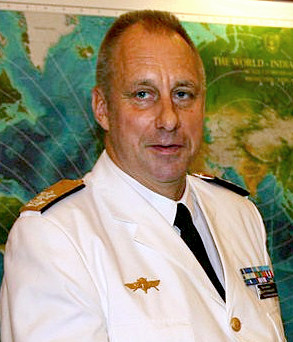
- Thörnqvist in 2014.
- Born: Anders Jan-Eric Törnqvist; 9 October 1959 (age 67); Karlskrona, Sweden
- Military career
- Allegiance: Sweden
- Branch: Swedish Navy
- Service years: 1979–2020
- Rank: Vice Admiral
- Commands: HSwMS Skaftö; HSwMS Ulvön; 4th Naval Warfare Flotilla; Naval Base; Chief of Navy; Maritime Component Command; Chief of Joint Operations; Commandant General in Stockholm

Vice Admiral Anders Jan-Eric Törnqvist (born 9 October 1959) is a retired Swedish Navy officer. Before his retirement in 2020, he served as the Chief of Joint Operations of the Swedish Armed Forces from 2016 to 2020 and as Commandant General in Stockholm from 2019 to 2020.

== Career ==
Thörnqvist began his career at the age of fifteen in the Swedish Sea Cadet Corps. He was commissioned into the Swedish Navy in 1976 and served as a basic Private and Petty Officer afloat on various types of ships in the Navy, including Minesweepers, Destroyers, Fast Patrol and Picket Boats. In 1981, he entered the Royal Swedish Naval Academy and graduated in 1982. He was commissioned as a Lieutenant Junior Grade and moved immediately to complete the Principal Warfare Officer training course. Thörnqvist was promoted to Lieutenant in 1983. From 1982 to 1983 he was 2nd Officer on Mine Warfare Ship and Icebreaker HSwMS Thule and various Mine Countermeasures Wessels. In addition, he became a qualified mine clearance diver and he served as 1st Instructor at the Naval Mine Warfare School (Minkrigsskolan).

He was commanding officer of the Diving Support Vessel HSwMS Skaftö from 1987 to 1988 and completed the Staff Course at the Swedish National Defence College in 1989. Thörnqvist was commander of the Naval MCM Divers Squadron (Röjdykardivisionen) from 1993 to 1996 and commanding officer of 411th MCM Divers Squadron and the Minehunter HSwMS Ulvön. From 1997 to 1999 he completed the Advanced Command Program at the Swedish National Defence College and was then Chief of Staff in the Visby-class corvette Trials Unit at the 3rd Naval Warfare Flotilla in Karlskrona from 1999 to 2001.

Thörnqvist was promoted to commander and served as Staff Officer at the Swedish Armed Forces Headquarters, Joint Forces Development, Staff Department, Analysis Section from 2001 to 2004. In June 2004 he attended the Naval Command College at the Naval War College in the United States. From 2005 to 2006 he headed the Forces Development, Plans and Policy Staff in the Joint Headquarters and from 2006 to 2009 Thörnqvist was commander of the 4th Naval Warfare Flotilla. From October to December 2009 he commanded the Naval Base in Karlskrona.

He was between 14 April and 14 August 2010 the EU Force Commander of EUNAVFOR Somalia - Operation ATALANTA and lead the multinational Force Headquarters on board the EU NAVFOR Swedish warship, HSwMS Carlskrona. Thörnqvist was promoted on 1 March 2011 to Rear Admiral and was appointed Chief of Navy the same day and was in this position the head of the Maritime Component Command. On 7 April 2016 he was promoted to vice admiral and appointed Chief of Joint Operations (Insatschef) of the Joint Forces Command (Insatsstaben). He assumed the position on 18 April 2016. In 2019, Jan Thörnqvist was appointed Commandant General in Stockholm. Törnqvist retired in 2020 and was succeeded as Chief of Joint Operations by Lieutenant General Michael Claesson.

== Personal life ==
Thörnqvist is married to Christina Martinsson and they have three children, Johan (born 1985), Henrik (born 1990) and Eric (born 2000).

== Dates of rank ==
Dates of rank:

- 1982: Sub-lieutenant
- 1983: Lieutenant
- 1989-07-01: Lieutenant commander
- 2001-04-01: Commander
- 2006-09-14: Captain
- 2010-01-12—09-30: Rear admiral (lower half) (constituted)
- 2010-01-01: Rear admiral (lower half)
- 2011-03-01: Rear admiral
- 2016-04-18: Vice admiral

== Awards and decorations ==
=== Swedish ===
- (Sweden) For Zealous and Devoted Service of the Realm
- (Sweden) Swedish Armed Forces Conscript Medal
- (Sweden) Swedish Armed Forces International Service Medal
- (Sweden) Swedish Reserve Officers Federation Merit Badge in silver (Förbundet Sveriges Reservofficerares förtjänsttecken i silver)
- (Sweden) National Association of Naval Volunteer Corps Medal of Merit in silver (Sjövärnskårernas Riksförbunds förtjänstmedalj i silver)
- (Sweden) 4th Naval Mine Warfare Flotilla Commemorative Medal (4. minkrigsflottiljens minnesmedalj) (Note: According to the ribbon bars of this picture)
- (Sweden) Coastal Ranger Association Medal of Merit in silver (Förbundet Kustjägarnas förtjänstmedalj i silver)

=== Foreign ===
- Commander, First Class, of the Order of the Lion of Finland (19 May 2016)
- (France) Commander of the National Order of Merit (2012)
- (Singapore) Pingat Jasa Gemilang (Tentera) (2014)
- (European Union) European Security and Defence Policy Service Medal – EUNAVFOR ATALANTA

== Honours ==
- Member 1380 of the Royal Swedish Society of Naval Sciences (2004).
- Member of the Royal Swedish Academy of War Sciences, Section II, Naval Warfare Studies (2012)
- Chairman of the Naval Officer's Society in Karlskrona (Sjöofficerssällskapet i Karlskrona) (2008)
- Chairman of Stiftelsen Drottning Victorias Örlogshem (2006)
- Member of the board of the Defence Materiel Administration
- Former member of the Swedish Maritime Administration

== Footnotes ==
Military offices
Preceded by Anders Grenstad	Chief of Navy; 2011–2016	Succeeded by Jens Nykvist
Preceded by Anders Grenstad	Maritime Component Command; 2011–2016	Succeeded by Jens Nykvist
Preceded by Göran Mårtensson	Chief of Joint Operations; 2016–2020	Succeeded by Michael Claesson
Preceded by Jonas Haggren	Commandant General in Stockholm; 2019–2020	Succeeded by Michael Claesson
