= Anders Grenstad =

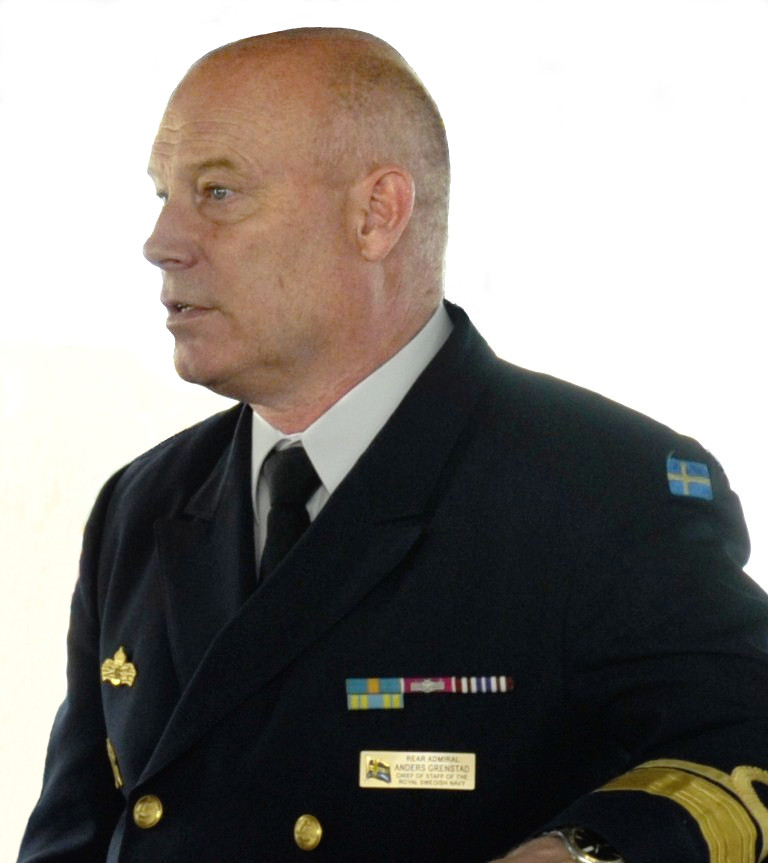
- Grenstad in 2010.
- Born: Anders Lennart Grenstad; 22 July 1958 (age 68); Stockholm, Sweden
- Military career
- Allegiance: Sweden
- Branch: Swedish Navy
- Service years: 1980–2019
- Rank: Rear Admiral
- Commands: 3rd Surface Warfare Flotilla; Naval Base; Inspector of the Navy; Naval Tactical Command/Maritime Component Command; NNSC; Deputy Chief of Joint Operations; Veterans' Unit; NNSC

Rear Admiral Anders Lennart Grenstad (born 22 July 1958) is a retired Swedish Navy officer. He served in the Swedish Navy for 39 years. Grenstad's senior commands include Inspector of the Navy, commanding officer of the Naval Tactical Command/Maritime Component Command, head of the Swedish delegation to the NNSC, Deputy Chief of Joint Operations and as head of the Swedish Veterans' Unit.

== Career ==
Grenstad was born on 2 July 1958 in Stockholm, Sweden, the son of captain Lennart Grenstad and his wife Barbro (née Nilsson).

== Career ==
Grenstad was commissioned as a naval officer in 1980 after graduating from the Royal Swedish Naval Academy at Näsby Castle. Before that, he had completed a circumnavigation trip with HSwMS Älvsnabben during 1977/1978. During his career as a naval officer he has held positions as corvette commander and commanding officer of the 3rd Surface Warfare Flotilla in Karlskrona. Grenstad did his staff course at the Military Academy Karlberg between 1994 and 1996. From January to April 2005 he was commanding officer of the Naval Base at the Karlskrona naval base.

On 1 July 2005, Grenstad was appointed Inspector of the Navy and was in this position also the commanding officer of the Naval Tactical Command from 2005 to 2007 and the Maritime Component Command from 2007 to 2011. He left the post on 24 February 2011 and took a position on 1 April 2011 as commanding officer of the Swedish delegation to the Neutral Nations Supervisory Commission (NNSC) in the Korean Demilitarized Zone between North Korea and South Korea. He left the post in 2013

On 25 November 2013, Grenstad was assigned to the Chief of Policy and Plans Department at the Swedish Armed Forces Headquarters. On 1 March 2014, Grenstad assumed the position of Deputy Chief of Joint Operations. During this time, in October 2014, the Swedish Navy carried out an intelligence operation in the Stockholm archipelago in response to a foreign submarine incursion into Swedish territorial waters. On 1 February 2016, became Acting Chief of Joint Operations and he served in this position until 1 June 2016 when he assumed the position of director of the Swedish Armed Forces Veterans' Unit. He there in this position until he again was appointed Commanding Officer of the Swedish delegation to the Neutral Nations Supervisory Commission (NNSC) on 1 March 2017.

== Personal life ==
On 21 July 1981, Grenstad got engaged to Anja van den Berg, a flight attendant from the Netherlands, and daughter of Frans van den Berg and his wife Annie (née Kitzen). They were married on 17 December 1982 in Zevenbergen, Netherlands. The civil wedding took place in Zevenbergen and then the church wedding with bridal mass took place in the Catholic monastery chapel Het Begijnhof in Breda.

They have two children. A daughter was born on 6 December 1983 at Karlskrona birthing center.

== Dates of rank ==
- 1980 – Sub-lieutenant
- 1983 – Lieutenant
- 1988 – Lieutenant commander
- 1998 – Commander
- 2002 – Captain
- 2005 – Rear admiral (lower half)
- 2005 – Rear admiral

== Awards and decorations ==
=== Swedish ===
- (Sweden) For Zealous and Devoted Service of the Realm
- (Sweden) Swedish Armed Forces Conscript Medal
- (Sweden) Swedish Armed Forces International Service Medal
- (Sweden) National Association of Naval Volunteer Corps Medal of Merit in silver (Sjövärnskårernas Riksförbunds förtjänstmedalj i silver) (2009)
- (Sweden) Coastal Ranger Association Medal of Merit (Förbundet Kustjägarnas förtjänstmedalj) in silver (13 December 2016)

=== Foreign ===
- (United States) Commander of the Legion of Merit
- (United States) Officer of the Legion of Merit
- (France) Officer of the National Order of Merit
- (South Korea) Order of National Security Merit, Cheon-Su Medal
- (Poland) Polish Army Medal in gold
- (Singapore) Pingat Jasa Gemilang (Tentera) (2007)
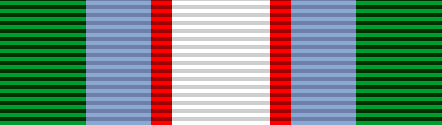
- (Switzerland) Medal for Operations Abroad, Korea. Neutral Nations Supervisory Commission (NNSC)

== Honours ==
- Inspector of naval academic association Sjöholm
- Member of the Royal Swedish Society of Naval Sciences (2000)
- Member of the Royal Swedish Academy of War Sciences (9 April 2007)
- Chairman of the Royal Swedish Academy of War Sciences (26 September 2018)

Military offices
Preceded by Leif Nylander	3rd Surface Warfare Flotilla; 2003–2005	Succeeded by Erik Andersson
Preceded by First holder	Naval Base; 2005–2005	Succeeded by Lennart Månsson
Preceded by Jörgen Ericsson	Inspector of the Navy; 2005–2011	Succeeded by Jan Thörnqvist
Preceded by Jörgen Ericsson	Naval Tactical Command/Maritime Component Command; 2005–2011	Succeeded by Jan Thörnqvist
Preceded by Christer Lidström	Head of Swedish Delegation to NNSC; 2011–2013	Succeeded by Berndt Grundevik
Preceded by Berndt Grundevik as Acting	Deputy Chief of Joint Operations; 2013–2016	Succeeded by Berndt Grundevik
Preceded by None	Swedish Armed Forces Veterans' Unit; 2016–2017	Succeeded by Torbjörn Larsson
Preceded by Mats Engman	Head of Swedish Delegation to NNSC; 2017–2019	Succeeded by Lars-Olof Corneliusson
Professional and academic associations
Preceded by Michael Zell	Chairman of the Royal Swedish Society of Naval Sciences; 2018–2023	Succeeded by Odd Werin
