= Peter Nordbeck (Swedish Navy officer) =

Swedish Navy officer (born 1938)

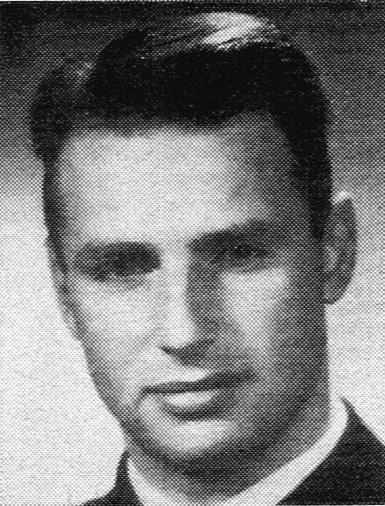
- Nordbeck as a sub-lieutenant in the 1960s
- Born: Peter Esbjörn Nordbeck; 19 July 1938 (age 88); Grängesberg, Sweden
- Military career
- Allegiance: Sweden
- Branch: Swedish Navy
- Service years: 1960–1998
- Rank: Vice admiral
- Commands: HSwMS Jägaren; 11th Torpedo Boat Division; 1st Surface Attack Flotilla; Chief of the Defence Staff; Joint Operations Command; Chief of Navy Command; Naval Command

Vice Admiral Peter Esbjörn Nordbeck (born 19 July 1938) is a Swedish Navy officer. He was Chief of the Defence Staff from 1992 to 1993 and the Chief of Navy Command from 1994 to 1998.

== Early life ==
Nordbeck was born on 19 July 1938 in Grängesberg, Sweden, the son of Stig Nordbeck and his wife Kerstin (née Froste). His father, an engineer, was employed by Gränges AB in Grängesberg in Dalarna at the time of Nordbeck's birth. Nordbeck has two siblings and two half-siblings. At the age of one year Nordbeck moved to Karlskrona where his father took up a position as chief engineer at Karlskrona City Municipal Enterprises in 1939. The Swedish Auxiliary Naval Corps got him interested in the sea and directed him to a naval officer course.

== Career ==
Nordbeck attended the Royal Swedish Naval Academy from 1957 to 1960 and served in the Coastal Fleet from 1960 to 1970 aboard destroyers and torpedo boats. Nordbeck then attended the Swedish Armed Forces Staff College from 1970 to 1972 and was captain of the HSwMS Jägaren and commanding officer of the 11th Torpedo Boat Division (11. torpedbåtsdivisionen) before attending the Naval War College in the United States from 1974 to 1975. Prior to his education in the United States, Nordbeck was a distinguished technician, but later focused on strategy and security policy. Back in Sweden, Nordbeck served in the Naval Staff from 1975 to 1978 and in the Defence Staff from 1978 to 1986, where he was captain and head of Planning Section 1 in the Planning Staff from 1 October 1982. On 1 October 1986, he took command of the 1st Surface Attack Flotilla (1. ytattackflottiljen). He then served as acting chief of staff of Southern Military District (Milo S) from 1988 to 1990 and then as chief of staff of the same from 1 October 1990. During 1992 Nordbeck was the head of the Supreme Commander's Planning Department at the Defence Staff and from 1 October 1992 to 1993 he served as Chief of the Defence Staff. From 1993, Nordbeck served as chief of the Joint Operations Command (Operationsledningen, OpL) until the 1 July 1994 when he was appointed Chief of Navy Command as well as Chief of the Naval Command, a position he held until 1 July 1998.

Nordbeck is an honorary member of the Royal Swedish Society of Naval Sciences, in which he was elected in 1978 as number 1046. He was president of the Royal Swedish Academy of War Sciences until 10 November 1999. He was also chairman and is honorary chairman of the Friends of the Vasa Museum Association. Nordbeck was also Inspectore Emeriti of the naval academic association SjöLund and Inspector of the naval association SjöCannnes.

== Personal life ==
On 9 September 1961, Nordbeck got engaged to physiotherapist Eva Lindblad (born 1941), the daughter of colonel Tord Lindblad and Ruth (née Strömberg). They married on 21 June 1962 in Oscar's Church in Stockholm. They have two children: Marie (born 3 January 1965 at Karlskrona birthing center), and Carl (born 24 December 1971 in Danderyd Hospital).

== Dates of rank ==
- 1960 – Acting sub-lieutenant
- 1962 – Sub-lieutenant
- 1968 – Lieutenant
- 1972 – Lieutenant commander
- 1973 – Commander
- 1980 – Commander with special position (Kommendörkapten med särskild tjänsteställning)
- 1 October 1982 – Captain
- 19?? – Senior captain
- 1988 – Rear admiral
- 1992 – Vice admiral

== Awards and decorations ==
- (Sweden) H. M. The King's Medal, 12th size gold (silver-gilt) medal worn around the neck on the Order of the Seraphim ribbon (7 February 2013)
- (Singapore) Pingat Jasa Gemilang (Tentera) (1998)

Military offices
| Preceded by Göran Wallén | Chief of Staff of the Southern Military District; 1988–1991 | Succeeded by ? |
| Preceded by Owe Wiktorin | Chief of the Defence Staff; 1 October 1992 – 1993 | Succeeded by None |
| Preceded by None | Chief of the Joint Operations Command (Operationsledningen); 1993 – 30 June 1994 | Succeeded by Percurt Green |
| Preceded by Dick Börjesson (as Chief of the Navy) | Chief of Navy Command; 1 July 1994 – 1 July 1998 | Succeeded by Torsten Lindh |
| Preceded by None | Naval Command; 1 July 1994 – 1 July 1998 | Succeeded by Torsten Lindh |
Professional and academic associations
| Preceded by Carl-Olof Ternryd | President of the Royal Swedish Academy of War Sciences; 1996–1999 | Succeeded by Jörn Beckmann |
