= Odd Werin =

Swedish rear admiral

- Born: Odd Sten-Eric Werin; 12 January 1958 (age 68); Stockholm, Sweden
- Military career
- Allegiance: Sweden
- Branch: Swedish Navy
- Service years: 1982–2021
- Rank: Rear Admiral
- Commands: HSwMS Styrbjörn; 33rd Coastal Corvette Division; 2nd Surface Combat Flotilla; Maritime Component Command

Rear Admiral Odd Sten-Eric Werin (born 12 January 1958) is a retired Swedish Navy officer. Werin graduated from the Royal Swedish Naval Academy in 1981 and advanced to rear admiral in 2010, holding command positions including the 2nd Surface Combat Flotilla and the Navy Command. He also served in senior staff roles, such as chief of defence planning and Sweden's military representative to the EU and NATO. Later, he worked with the Swedish Defence Materiel Administration, leading its Navy Department and Navy Materiel Business Area. Since 2021, he has held CEO roles in defense and consulting companies, including Odds Solutions AB and Scandinavian Astor Group AB.

== Early life ==
Werin was born on 12 January 1958 in Skeppsholm Parish in the City of Stockholm, Sweden.

== Career ==
Werin graduated from the Royal Swedish Naval Academy in 1981, earning his commission as a sub-lieutenant in the Swedish Navy the same year. He was promoted to lieutenant in 1983 and to lieutenant commander in 1989. From 1989 to 1990, he served as commanding officer of the patrol boat Styrbjörn in the 13th Patrol Boat Division (13. patrullbåtsdivisionen). Between 1992 and 1994, he completed the Technical Warfare Course in electronic warfare at the Swedish Armed Forces Staff College. He was promoted to commander in 1996, took command of the 33rd Coastal Corvette Division (33. kustkorvettdivisionen) in Karlskrona in 1997, and was appointed commander with special status in 1998. On 2 February 1998, he began a new position as a staff officer in the Partnership Coordination Cell within the Partnership for Peace (PfP) program at the Supreme Headquarters Allied Powers Europe (SHAPE) in Mons, Belgium.

He was promoted to captain in 2000 and subsequently served as commanding officer of the 2nd Surface Combat Flotilla (Andra ytstridsflottiljen) from 2000 to 2002. From 2002 to 2005, he was head of the Naval Operations Department in the Joint Forces Directorate (Krigsförbandsledningen) at the Swedish Armed Forces Headquarters, and from 2005 to 2006 he served as head of the Naval Department within the Force Production Unit (Förbandsenheten) at Headquarters.

Werin was promoted to rear admiral (lower half) in 2006 and became chief of the Navy Command within the Operations Department at the Armed Forces Headquarters (2006–2007). He then served as deputy chief of the Maritime Component Command in the Joint Forces Command (JFC) (Insatsledningen, INS) from 2007 to 2009, and as head of the Naval Department within the Training and Procurement Staff (Produktionsledningens marinavdelning) from 2009 to 2010.

Following his promotion to rear admiral, Werin served as chief of defence planning from 2010 to 2013, and subsequently as Sweden's Military Representative to the European Union and NATO beginning in 2013. The Swedish Armed Forces made Werin available to the Swedish Defence Materiel Administration (FMV) from 1 September 2016. There, he was initially head of the Navy Department within the Systems and Production Management and later head of the Navy Materiel Business Area.

In May 2015, Werin is one of the Swedish people sanctioned by Russia during the Russo-Ukrainian War.

== Later life ==
Werin has been CEO of the consulting company Odds Solutions AB since 23 February 2021. He was CEO and Group CEO of the Swedish defense company Scandinavian Astor Group AB between 1 September 2022 and 1 August 2024 and its subsidiary My-Konsult AB.

== Dates of rank ==
- 1981 – Sub-lieutenant
- 1983 – Lieutenant
- 1989 – Lieutenant commander
- 1996 – Commander
- 1998 – Kommendörkapten med särskild tjänsteställning
- 2000 – Captain
- 2006 – Rear admiral (lower half)
- 2010 – Rear admiral

== Honours ==
- Member of the Royal Swedish Society of Naval Sciences (1998) (chairman from 2023)
- Member of the Royal Swedish Academy of War Sciences (2008)

Military offices
| Preceded by Bengt Andersson | Chief of the Navy Command; 2006–2007 | Succeeded by None |
| Preceded by None | Deputy Chief of the Maritime Component Command; 2007–2009 | Succeeded by None |
| Preceded by Karl Engelbrektson | Sweden's Military Representative to the EU and NATO; 2013–2016 | Succeeded by Thomas Nilsson |
Professional and academic associations
| Preceded by Anders Grenstad | Chairman of the Royal Swedish Society of Naval Sciences; 2023–present | Succeeded by Incumbent |
