= Torsten Lindh =

Swedish Navy officer (1941–2020)

- Born: Erik Torsten Lindh; 10 August 1941; Gothenburg, Sweden
- Died: 7 August 2020 (aged 78); Orust, Sweden
- Military career
- Allegiance: Sweden
- Branch: Swedish Navy
- Service years: 1965–2001
- Rank: Rear Admiral
- Commands: HSwMS Norrtälje; HSwMS Strömstad; 3rd Patrol Boat Division; 3rd Naval Warfare Flotilla; Joint Staff; Inspector General of the Navy; Naval Center/Naval Tactical Command

Rear Admiral Erik Torsten Lindh (10 August 1941 – 7 August 2020) was a Swedish Navy officer. He was Inspector General of the Navy from 1998 to 2001.

== Early life ==
Lindh was born on 10 August 1941 in Gothenburg, Sweden, the son of managing director Arne Lindh and his wife Margareta (née Richs). He passed studentexamen in Gothenburg in 1961. Before his military service at Bohuslän Regiment (I 17) in Uddevalla, Lindh studied mathematics at the university with the aim of becoming a civil engineer. He disliked the university and sent an application to the Swedish Navy and was accepted.

== Career ==
Lindh was commissioned as an officer after graduating from the Royal Swedish Naval Academy in 1965 and then served as first officer of the torpedo boat HSwMS Astrea. Lindh was later captain of the torpedo boats HSwMS Norrtälje and HSwMS Strömstad and commanding officer of the 3rd Patrol Boat Division (3. patrullbåtsdivisionen). He attended the Swedish Armed Forces Staff College in 1975 and served in the Planning and Budget Secretariat at the Ministry of Defence from 1983 and attended the Swedish National Defence College in 1985. Lindh was commanding officer of the 3rd Naval Warfare Flotilla from 1988 to 1989. From 1989 to 1992, Lindh was head of the Program Staff (Programledning) in the Naval Staff at the Swedish Armed Forces Headquarters. He was promoted to senior captain in 1993. He served as head of the Swedish Armed Forces Internal Audit until the 1 July 1994 when he was promoted to rear admiral and appointed Director Joint Staff (Chef för ledningsstaben) in the Swedish Armed Forces Headquarters. Lindh served as the Inspector General of the Navy and commander of the Naval Center/Naval Tactical Command from 1998 to 2001.

=== Post-retirement ===
Lindh retired from active service in 2001 at the age of 60 and was then chairman of the Air Defense Investigation (Luftförsvarsutredningen) for one year. He then took up a position as a teacher of mathematics at Samskolan in Saltsjöbaden. He was named Teacher of the Year by the students. Lindh was a board member of the Defence Materiel Administration and the Swedish Fortifications Agency. He was also a member of the Royal Swedish Society of Naval Sciences and the Royal Swedish Academy of War Sciences. During the years 1997–2003, Lindh was chairman of the Naval Officers' Association in Stockholm (Sjöofficerssällskapet i Stockholm). He also actively participated in the Friends of the Vasa Museum association and the Vasa Redeviva foundation. He was also chairman of the Ymer 80 Foundation and was involved in Swedeship Marine, which builds fast and powerful aluminum boats for professional use.

== Personal life ==
In 1966 he married banker Kristina Bane (born 1943), the daughter of civil engineer Per Bane and Eivor (née Almér). They had two children: Magnus and Annika. He lived in Västerhaninge and had a summer house on Orust.

== Death ==
Lindh died on 7 August 2020 in Kungsviken, Orust Municipality, Sweden. The funeral was held on 28 August 2020 in Morlanda Church on Orust. He was interred in Morlanda Old Cemetery on 2 October 2020.

== Dates of rank ==
- 1965 – Acting sub-lieutenant
- 19?? – Sub-lieutenant
- 19?? – Lieutenant
- 1976 – Lieutenant commander
- 1981 – Commander
- 1988 – Captain
- 1993 – Senior captain
- 1994 – Rear admiral

Military offices
Preceded by Bengt Anderberg	Joint Staff; 1994–????	Succeeded by ?
Preceded by Peter Nordbeck (as Chief of Naval Staff)	Inspector General of the Navy; 1998–2001	Succeeded by Jörgen Ericsson
Preceded by Peter Nordbeck	Naval Center/Naval Tactical Command; 1998–2001	Succeeded by Jörgen Ericsson
