= Jörgen Ericsson =

Swedish rear admiral and commander of the navy (born 1953)

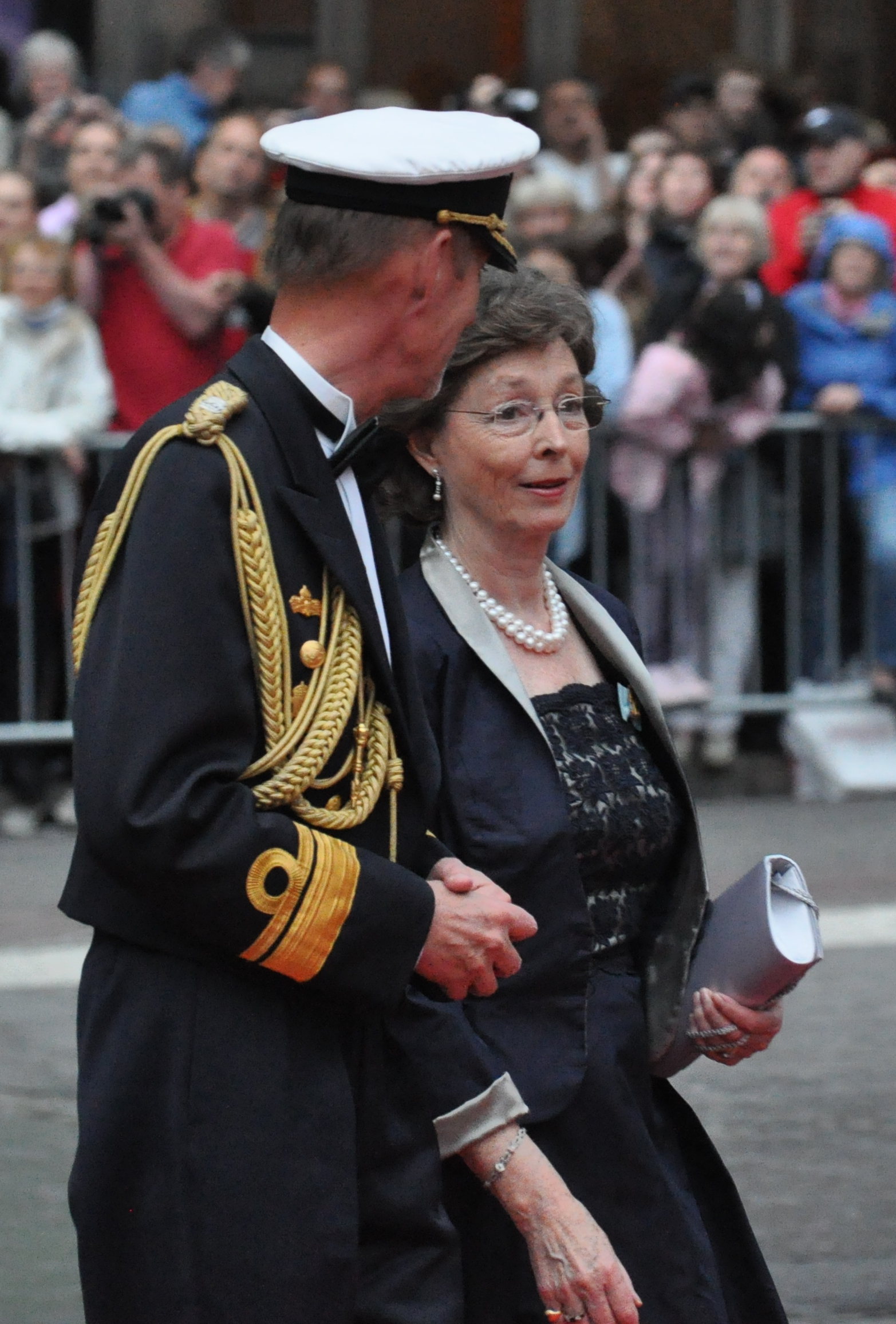
- Ericsson at the Wedding of Victoria, Crown Princess of Sweden, and Daniel Westling.
- Born: Jörgen Fredrik Ericsson; 25 November 1953 (age 72); Falun, Sweden
- Military career
- Allegiance: Sweden
- Branch: Swedish Navy
- Service years: 1975–2015
- Rank: Rear Admiral
- Commands: HSwMS Malmö; 31st Corvette Division; 3rd Surface Warfare Flotilla; Inspector (General) of the Navy; Navy Command; Chief of Staff, SwAFHQ; Swedish Armed Forces Special Forces

Rear Admiral Jörgen Fredrik Ericsson (born 25 November 1953) is a retired Swedish Navy officer. His senior commands include commanding officer of the 3rd Surface Warfare Flotilla from 1999 to 2001, the Inspector (General) of the Navy from 2001 to 2005 and Chief of Staff as well as head of the Swedish Armed Forces Headquarters from 2005 to 2007.

== Early life ==
Ericsson was born on 25 November 1953 in Falu Kristine parish in Kopparberg County, Sweden Ericsson enrolled at the Royal Swedish Naval Academy in 1972, then located in Näsbypark north of Stockholm.

== Career ==
Ericsson was commissioned as an officer in 1975. He then held different position up to first lieutenant (sekond) position on destroyers, torpedo boats and missile boats. Ericsson was also a teacher in combat management and torpedo/RBS-15 at the Surface Attack School (Ytattackskolan) and the Telecommunications Combat School (Telestridsskola) at the Berga Naval Training Schools and at the Royal Swedish Naval Academy. During this time, Ericsson also passed the general course of the Swedish Armed Forces Staff College from 1982 to 1983 and the higher course from 1988 to 1990, focusing on operations/strategy. He also passed the staff course at the National War College in United States from 1988 to 1990. He served as flag lieutenant (flaggadjutant) in staff of the Coastal Fleet from 1990 to 1992, responsible for operational initiatives, such as anti-submarine warfare. Ericsson then served as preparedness officer in the Defence Staff's Operarational Department 2/Swedish Armed Forces Headquarters Implementation Department from 1992 to 1994. During the period 1993-2001 he was also aide-de-camp to His Majesty the King.

Ericsson spent a year at the Naval Command College at the Naval War College in the United States from 1994 to 1995. He was commanding officer of the 31st Corvette Division (31. korvettdivisionen) from 1995 to 1996 as well as captain of the corvette HSwMS Malmö. He served as commanding officer of the missile boat division of the Coastal Fleet from 1 January 1996. In 1997 he served as acting head of the Planning Department of the Swedish Armed Forces Headquarter's Planning Staff and from 1998 to 1999, he was the head of the same department. Also in 1998, Ericsson passed the senior management course at the Swedish National Defence College. Ericsson was then commanding officer of the 3rd Surface Warfare Flotilla from 1999 to 2001. In 2000 he completed the Swedish National Defence College's senior executive course at Solbacka in Södermanland. He was promoted to rear admiral (lower half) on 15 March 2001 and Ericsson assumed the position of Inspector General of the Navy as well as head of the Navy Command on 1 October 2001 and was promoted to rear admiral (konteramiral). At a ceremony held at Berga Naval Base on 28 September 2001, Ericsson received the navy's command sign from rear admiral Torsten Lindh.

In 2002 Ericsson passed the Senior International Defense Management Course at the Naval Postgraduate School in United States. The year after he was appointed chief aide-de-camp in His Majesty the King's Staff. Also in 2003, the title Inspector General of the Navy was changed and Ericsson now became Inspector of the Navy in the Swedish Armed Forces Headquarters. He left the position in 2005 and on 1 May he was appointed Chief of Staff as well as head of the Swedish Armed Forces Headquarters. He was at the same time also head of the Swedish Armed Forces Special Forces (Försvarsmaktens specialförband, FM SF). As Chief of Staff, Ericsson was responsible for developing the headquarter's organization and working methods. On 1 April 2007, the developed organization was implemented and Ericsson was appointed Chief of the Strategy Department in the Defence Staff (Ledningsstabens strategiavdelning, LEDS STRA) which he was until 2009. Ericsson was after this Chief of the Plans and Finance Department in the Defence Staff (Ledningsstabens planerings- och ekonomiavdelning, LEDS PLANEK) from 2009 to 2010. Ericsson was then defence attaché in Washington, D.C. from 2011 to 2014. He retired from active service on 1 April 2015.

== Personal life ==
In 1981 he married Malin (née Lennmor). They have two children, Caroline and Anders.

== Dates of rank ==
- 1975 – Sub-lieutenant
- 1978 – Lieutenant
- 1982 – Lieutenant
- 1992 – Commander
- 1994 – Commander with special position (Kommendörkapten med särskild tjänsteställning)
- 1996 – Captain
- 2001 – Rear admiral (lower half)
- 2001 – Rear admiral

== Awards and decorations ==
Ericsson's awards:

=== Swedish ===
- (Sweden) For Zealous and Devoted Service of the Realm (2005)
- (Sweden) Swedish Armed Forces Conscript Medal
- (Sweden) H. M. The King's Medal, 8th size gold (silver-gilt) medal worn on the chest suspended by the Order of the Seraphim ribbon (1998)
- (Sweden) King Carl XVI Gustaf's Jubilee Commemorative Medal I (1996)
- (Sweden) Flottans Mäns Association's Anchor Medal in Gold (Föreningen Flottans Mäns Ankarmedalj i guld)

=== Foreign ===
- Knight First Class of the Order of the White Rose of Finland (1994)
- (Chile) Commander of the Order of Bernardo O'Higgins (1996)
- (Italy) 3rd Class / Commander of the Order of Merit of the Italian Republic (5 May 1998)
- (Argentina) Commander of the Order of May (4 June 1998)
- (Singapore) Meritorious Service Medal (Military) (2004)
- (Latvia) Commander of the Order of the Three Stars (2005)
- (Mexico) La Condecoración a la Distinción Naval (2004)
- (Bulgaria) First Class of the Order Of The Madar Horseman with Swords (2007)

== Honours ==
- Member of the Royal Swedish Society of Naval Sciences (1995)
- Member of the Royal Swedish Academy of War Sciences (2001) (vice president in 2017)
- National honorary chairman of the Flottans Mäns Association (2001–2005)
- Chairman of the Naval Officers Society in Stockholm (Sjöofficerssällskapet i Stockholm) (2003–2009)
- Chairman of the Swedish Armed Forces Headquarter's Friends Association (HKV Kamratförening) (2005–)

Military offices
Preceded by Tommy Åsman	3rd Surface Warfare Flotilla; 1999–2001	Succeeded by Leif Nylander
Preceded by Torsten Lindh	Inspector (General) of the Navy; 2001–2005	Succeeded by Anders Grenstad
Preceded by Torsten Lindh	Navy Command; 2001–2003	Succeeded by Bengt Andersson
Preceded by Claes-Göran Fant (as Chief of the Strategic Plans and Policy Directorate)	Chief of Staff, Swedish Armed Forces Headquarters; 2005–2007	Succeeded by Sverker Göranson (as Chief of Defence Staff)
Preceded by Johan Kihl	Swedish Armed Forces Special Forces; 2005–2009	Succeeded by Jan Salestrand
