= Stellan Fagrell =

Swedish naval officer (1943–2022)

- Born: Karl Stellan Fagrell; 21 July 1943; Lidköping, Sweden
- Died: 30 April 2022 (aged 78); Kårböle, Sweden
- Military career
- Branch: Amphibious Corps (Swedish Navy)
- Service years: 1970–2003
- Rank: Senior Colonel
- Commands: Inspector of the Swedish Coast Artillery; Coastal Artillery Center; Dep cmdr, Navy Command; Deputy Inspector General of the Navy

Senior Colonel Karl Stellan Fagrell (21 July 1943 – 30 April 2022) was an officer in the Swedish Amphibious Corps. He served as Deputy Inspector General of the Navy from 1998 to 2001.

== Early life ==
Fagrell was born on 21 July 1943 in Lidköping Parish (Lidköpings församling) in Lidköping, Skaraborg County, Sweden.

== Career ==
Fagrell graduated from the Royal Swedish Naval Academy in Näsbypark on 27 August 1970 and was commissioned as an officer. Fagrell was awarded the Naval Academy's gold token for excellent academic results, an award that had previously only been awarded four times since 1944. He was assigned to Vaxholm Coastal Artillery Regiment as a second lieutenant the same year, where he was promoted to lieutenant in 1972 and to captain in 1973. He studied at the Swedish Armed Forces Staff College from 1976 to 1979, served in the Defence Staff between 1979 and 1986 and at the Swedish Defence Materiel Administration from 1980 to 1983 and was promoted to major in 1981. He attended the technical course at the Naval Program at the Swedish Armed Forces Staff College and was promoted to lieutenant colonel in 1985, after which he was head of the naval mine battalion in the Vaxholm Coastal Artillery Regiment from 1986 to 1989. From 1989 to 1992 he served at the Swedish Defence Materiel Administration, after which in 1992–1993 he studied at the Naval War College in the United States. He was promoted to colonel on 1 July 1993, and served as chief of staff in the Naval Materiel Command at the Swedish Defence Materiel Administration from 1993 to 1995. He studied at the Swedish National Defence College in 1994 and served as Deputy Commander of the East Coast Naval Command from 1995 to 1997.

In 1996, he was secretary in a government negotiation assignment (Fö 1996:B) regarding the privatization of Muskö naval dockyard's site at Rindö. In 1997, he was promoted to senior colonel, whereupon he served as Inspector of the Swedish Coast Artillery (Kustartilleriinspektör, IKA) and head of the Swedish Coastal Artillery Center (Kustartillericentrum, KAC) from 1997 to 1998. Fagrell then served from 1998 to 2001 as deputy commander of the Naval Center (renamed Navy Command in 2000) as well as the Deputy Inspector General of the Navy. From 2001 to 2003 was chief engineer for naval combat systems at the Swedish Defence Materiel Administration.

== Personal life ==
Fagrell was married to Birgitta with whom he had three children: Niklas, Maria and Daniel.

Fagrell was chairman of Kårböle community council (Swedish: byalag) and chairman of the board of Vaxholm Fortress Museum.

== Death ==
Fagrell died on 30 April 2022 in Kårböle, Gävleborg County, Sweden. The funeral service was held on 27 May 2022 in Kårböle Church.

== Dates of rank ==
- 1970 – Second lieutenant
- 1972 – Lieutenant
- 1973 – Captain
- 1981 – Major
- 1985 – Lieutenant colonel
- 1993 – Colonel
- 1997 – Senior colonel

== Honours ==
- Member of the Royal Swedish Society of Naval Sciences (1990)

Military offices
Preceded by Claes-Göran Hedén	Inspector of the Swedish Coast Artillery; 1997–1998	Succeeded by None
Preceded by Claes-Göran Hedén	Swedish Coastal Artillery Center; 1997–1998	Succeeded by None
Preceded by None	Deputy Commander, Navy Command; 1998–2001	Succeeded by Staffan Palmqvist
Preceded by None	Deputy Inspector General of the Navy; 1998–2001	Succeeded by None
