= Swedish Fleet =

- Svenska flottan
- Active: 1522–present
- Country: Sweden
- Branch: Swedish Navy
- Headquarters: Haninge Garrison
- March: "Kungl. Flottans Paradmarsch"
- Anniversaries: 9 July (Battle of Svensksund)

The Swedish Fleet (Swedish: Svenska flottan) is the naval warfare arm of the Swedish Navy, with an emphasis on sea control.

== History ==
=== Foundation ===
The Swedish Fleet was established in 1522 during the Swedish War of Liberation. Its earliest mission was to protect maritime connections between the mainland and Österland.

After the War of Liberation, the Fleet was rapidly expanded to meet operational demands, including naval battles, the interception of enemy merchant shipping, and the protection of Swedish overseas territories.

=== Present ===
In line with its renewed role since the start of Swedish neutrality, the Fleet is equipped to defend merchant shipping and the coast against a foreign invasion. Since the end of the Cold War, it has also been equipped for international operations under the United Nations.

=== Organisation ===
After the Coastal Fleet was disbanded in 1998, the Swedish Fleet has been organised into two naval warfare flotillas and one submarine flotilla:

- 1st Submarine Flotilla located in Karlskrona
- 3rd Naval Warfare Flotilla located in Karlskrona
- 4th Naval Warfare Flotilla located in Berga
- Naval Warfare Centre located in Karlskrona

== Sources ==
- E. W., Lars (16 Jan 2024). "Svenska flottan – femhundra år av segrar och bottennapp". popularhistoria.se (in Swedish).
- SFHM (22 Feb 2023). "MARINBILAGA" (PDF). sfhm.se (in Swedish). National Swedish Museums of Military History.
