= Maritime Component Command =

- Marinens taktiska stab
- Active: 1994–2018
- Country: Sweden
- Allegiance: Swedish Armed Forces
- Branch: Swedish Navy
- Type: Military staff
- Role: Operational, territorial and tactical operations
- Size: Staff
- Part of: Swedish Armed Forces Headquarters
- Garrison/HQ: Stockholm
- March: "Flottans paradmarsch" (Wagner)

Maritime Component Command (Swedish: Marinens taktiska stab, MTS) was a part of the Joint Forces Command of the Swedish Armed Forces. The staff was located at the Swedish Armed Forces Headquarters in Stockholm and is headed by the Chief of Navy. The Maritime Component Command commanded the operations of the Swedish Navy forces.

== History ==
The Maritime Component Command was established in September 1993 under the name of the Naval Tactical Center (Marinens taktiska centrum, MTC) which has its origin in the Naval Staff which was disbanded on 30 June 1994 in connection with the Swedish Armed Forces becoming a single government agency on 1 July 1994. The Naval Staff was partly replaced by the Naval Command (Marinledningen) on 1 July 1994. The Naval Command, which was part of the newly established Swedish Armed Forces Headquarters, was a production unit which sorted directly under the authority of the head of the agency, that is, the Supreme Commander. The Naval Tactical Center was in turn directly subordinate of the military commander of the Middle Military District (Milo M).

On 1 July 1998, the Naval Tactical Center, along with the Naval Command, was reorganized and formed the Naval Center (Marincentrum, MarinC) and the Chief of Navy Staff position was replaced by the Inspector General of the Navy position on 30 June 1998. The navy's highest command was thus localized to Hårsfjärden.

In the Defence Act of 2000, where the four regional Naval Command's (Marinkommando) were disbanded on 30 June 2000, the Naval Center was also disbanded as an independent unit. From 1 July 2000, the Naval Center was amalgamated in the Joint Forces Command (OPIL) under the name Naval Tactical Command (Marintaktiska kommandot, MTK). In 2003, the Inspector General of the Navy position was changed to Inspector of the Navy. On 1 April 2007, the command was reorganized and received its current name, the Maritime Component Command (Marinens taktiska stab, MTS), and is sorted under the Joint Forces Command.

In February 2018, the Swedish Armed Forces proposed in its budget for 2019 to the Government a reorganization of the command structure. The proposal was, among other things, designed with a new command and new organizational units in new locations. This was to provide better conditions for a robust and sustainable command. The new organizational units that the Swedish Armed Forces wanted to form were proposed to be named the Army Staff, the Air Staff and the Naval Staff. These would be formed by a merger of the Training & Procurement Staff and the Joint Forces Command, as well as other complementary parts from the Swedish Armed Forces Headquarters and the Defence Materiel Administration. The staffs were proposed to be formed on 1 January 2019 and commanded by an army chief, a naval chief and an air force chief.

== Heraldry and traditions ==
=== Coat of arms ===
The coat of the arms of the Naval Tactical Center 1994–1997. Blazon: "Per chevron azure and or, an anchor erect cabled, surmounted two gunbarrels of older pattern in saltire in base proper, all in sable".

The coat of the arms of the Maritime Component Command 2007–2018. It was used by Naval Staff 1979–1994, the Naval Command 1994–1997, the Naval Tactical Center 1997–1998, the Naval Center 1998–2000 and the Naval Tactical Command 2000–2007. Blazon: "Azure, an anchor erect cabled, surmounted two gunbarrels old pattern in saltire, all in or".

Coat of the arms of the Naval Tactical Center (MTC) 1994–1997.

Coat of arms of the Naval Staff 1979–1994, the Naval Command 1994–1997, the Naval Tactical Center 1997–1998, the Naval Center 1998–2000, the Naval Tactical Command 2000–2007 and the Maritime Component Command 2007–2018.

== Commanding officers ==
=== Marinledningen ===
==== Chiefs ====
- 1994–1998: Vice admiral Peter Nordbeck

=== Marincentrum ===
==== Chiefs ====
- 1998–2000: Rear admiral Torsten Lindh

==== Deputy Chiefs ====
- 1998–2000: Senior colonel Stellan Fagrell

=== Marintaktiska kommandot ===
==== Chiefs ====
- 2000–2001: Rear admiral Torsten Lindh
- 2001–2003: Rear admiral Jörgen Ericsson
- 2003–2005: Brigadier general Bengt Andersson
- 2006–2007: Rear admiral (lower half) Odd Werin

==== Deputy Chiefs ====
- 2000–2001: Senior colonel Stellan Fagrell
- 2002–2004: Vacant
- 2004–2007: Captain Staffan Palmqvist

=== Marintaktiska stabsledningen ===
==== Chiefs ====
- 2007–2011: Rear admiral Anders Grenstad

==== Deputy Chiefs ====
- 2007–2009: Rear admiral (lower half) Odd Werin

==== Chiefs of Staff ====
- 2007–2008: Colonel Hans Granlund
- 2008–????: Captain Bo Gunnar Rask

== Names, designations and locations ==
Name	Translation	From		To
Marinledningen	Naval Command (Note: Also translated as the Headquarters of the [Swedish] Naval Forces or the Navy Department.)	1994-07-01	–	1998-06-30
Marinens taktiska centrum	Naval Tactical Center	1994-07-01	–	1998-06-30
Marincentrum	Naval Center	1998-07-01	–	2000-06-30
Marintaktiska kommandot	Navy Command	2000-07-01	–	2007-03-31
Marinens taktiska stab	Maritime Component Command	2007-04-01	–	2018-12-31
Designation		From		To
ML/MTC		1994-07-01	–	1998-06-30
MarinC		1998-07-01	–	2000-06-30
MTK		2000-07-01	–	2007-03-31
MTS		2007-04-01	–	2018-12-31
Location		From		To
Stockholm Garrison		1994-07-01	–	1997-12-31
Haninge Garrison		1994-07-01	–	2002-12-31
Uppsala Garrison		2003-01-01	–	2007-??-??
Stockholm Garrison		2007-??-??	–	2018-12-31
