= Kommendör av 1. graden =

Rank of the Swedish Navy

- Country: Sweden
- Service branch: Swedish Navy
- Abbreviation: Kmd 1.gr
- Rank: Senior captain
- NATO rank code: OF-5+
- Non-NATO rank: OF-6+
- Formation: 1972
- Abolished: 2000
- Next higher rank: Rear admiral (1972–2000); Rear admiral (lower half) (2000–)
- Next lower rank: Captain
- Equivalent ranks: Överste av 1. graden

Kommendör av 1. graden (Note: Kommendör av 1. graden is literally translated as captain of the 1st degree or captain 1st class. Some sources translates it as commodore; a somewhat misleading translation given that the purpose of the introduction of the rank was that the Swedish government did not want to contribute to an increase in the number of flag officers in the Swedish Armed Forces. The rank is rather a senior captain rank then a commodore rank.) was a senior captain rank of the Swedish Navy, ranking below rear admiral (1972–2000) and rear admiral (lower half) (since 2000), and above captain.

== History ==
In 1972, the so-called employment reform (tjänstställningsreformen) was implemented. In connection with the Swedish Armed Forces' increasing involvement in international operations with UN battalions and observers, it became increasingly clear that the Swedish service system did not quite correspond to what was common in other countries. A Swedish captain had basically the same training and service as a major in other countries' defense forces. In many cases, a Swedish colonel had tasks that in other armed forces were performed by brigadier generals. During the 1960s, this was solved many times by the Swedish officers being given a higher rank during their service abroad. The Supreme Commander suggested to the Swedish government that the Swedish service system should be changed, so that the captains would receive the rank of major and the majors would receive the rank of lieutenant colonel. He further proposed that a new general, brigadier general, be introduced. The government approved the Supreme Commander's proposal regarding captains and majors. No new general rank was introduced. The motivation for the government not following the Supreme Commander's proposal in this respect was that it did not want to contribute to an increase in the number of generals and admirals in the Swedish Armed Forces. However, the government decided to introduce the rank of kommendör av 1. graden (senior captain) for the navy and överste av 1. graden (senior colonel) for the army. The reform was implemented on 1 July 1972.

During the 1990s, the Swedish government raised the issue of introducing a rank for professional officers called brigadier general and rear admiral (lower half), respectively, and stated there, among other things, the following. For a few years, the Swedish Armed Forces had in various ways announced that they wished to change the current rank level system for professional officers. The idea was that the rank of överste 1. graden (senior colonel) and kommendör av 1. graden (senior captain) would be abolished and instead replaced with the rank of brigadier general and rear admiral (lower half). The reason for this was stated to be that then almost only Sweden did not have this rank. The increased international cooperation was thus considered to have been made more difficult. Denmark, Norway and Finland had recently introduced the brigadier general's rank. The government stated in the same bill that the issue should be prepared further before a position was taken on the proposal. In 1999, the government stated that the said rank should now be introduced and intended to make changes to the bill (1994:642) with instructions for the Swedish Armed Forces and the Officers Ordinance (1994:882) with effect from 1 July 2000.

The rear admiral (lower half) rank was finally introduced in 2000 and replaced the old rank of kommendör av 1. graden. Anyone who, according to older regulations, held the rank of kommendör av 1. graden would continue to hold that rank until otherwise decided. Thus, the rank of kommendör av 1. graden was placed between the rank of rear admiral (lower half) and the rank of captain.

== Uniform ==
=== Shoulder mark ===
The top galloon is shaped like a "loop" for an officer in the Swedish Navy (the loop is shaped like a "grenade" for an officer in the Swedish Amphibious Corps). The rank insignia is worn on the shoulder mark to jacket and coat (jacka m/87, kappa m/87), as well as to blue wool sweater (blå ylletröja m/87), trench coat (trenchcoat m/84), sea coat (sjörock 93, black raincoat and to white shirt (vit skjorta m/78). Rank insignia on shoulder mark (axelklaffshylsa 02B) is worn on all garments with shoulder straps.

The shoulder mark consists of a 16 mm star m/30 in gold embroidery, 16 mm galloon m/51 and 8 mm galloon m/51.

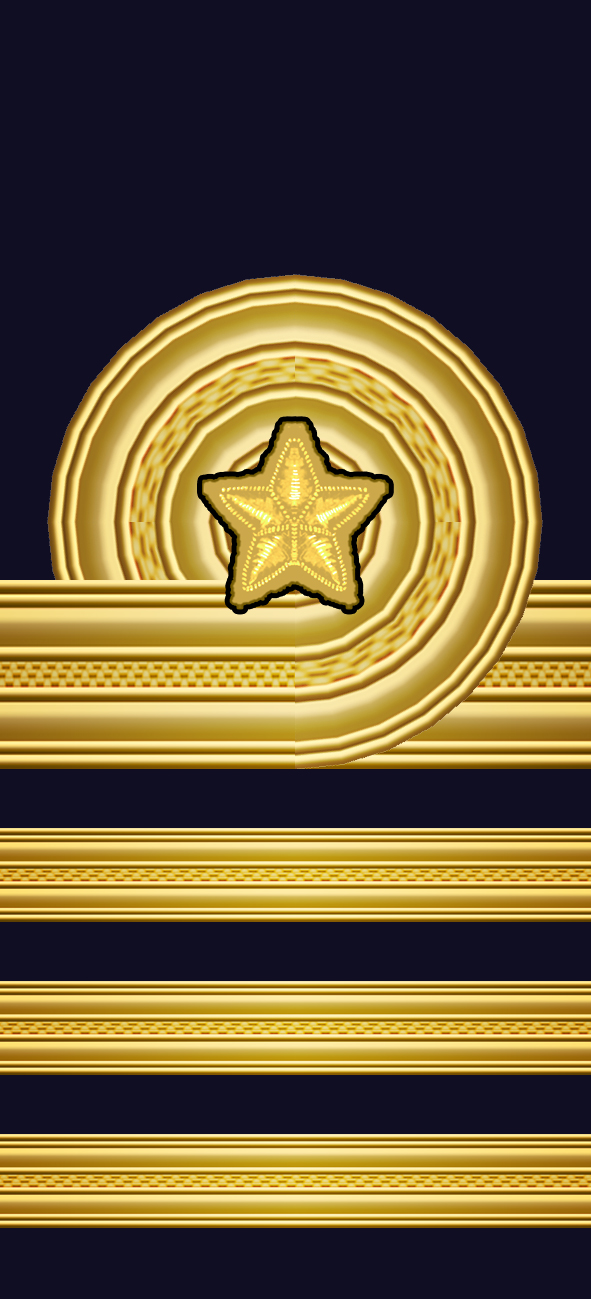
Embroidered shoulder mark

=== Sleeve insignia ===
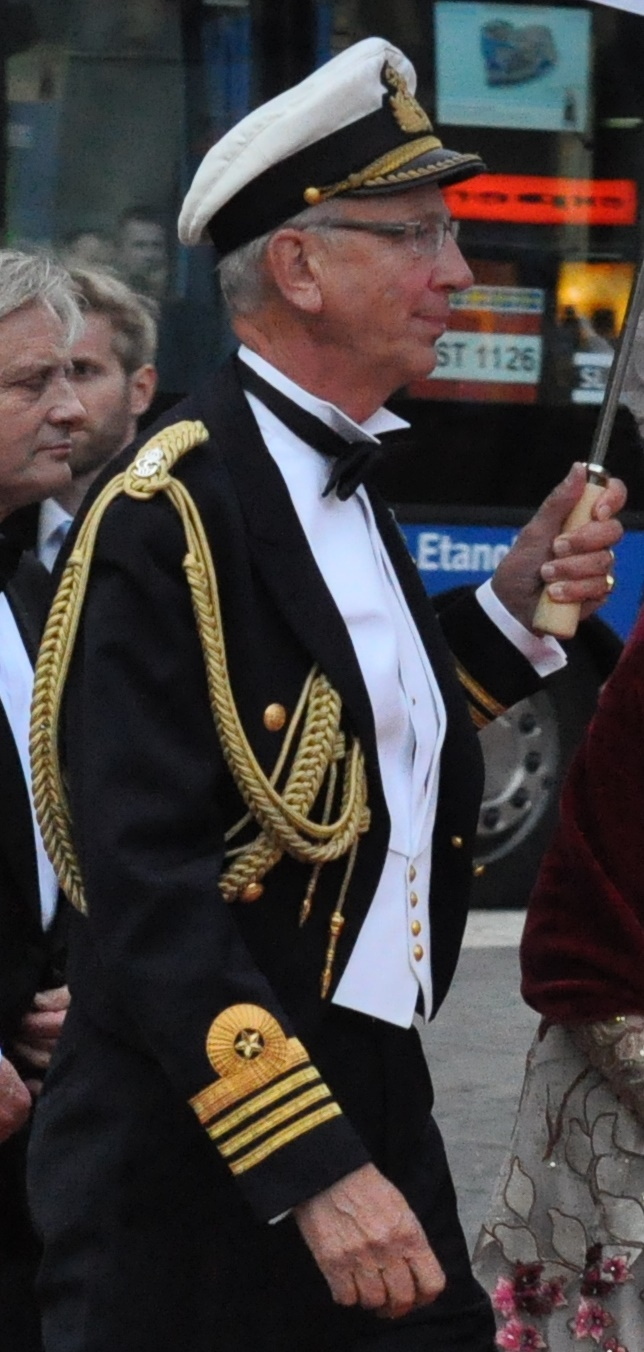
Kommendör av 1. graden Gustaf von Hofsten in 2010.

Rank insignia is worn on both sleeves for inner suit jacket (innerkavaj m/48) and mess jacket (mässjacka m/1878). The sleeve insignia consists of a 24 mm star m/30 in gold embroidery, one 23 mm galloon m/51 and three 11 mm galloons m/51. The distance between galloons should be 6 mm. The distance from the bottom edge of the sleeve to the bottom edge of the top galloon should be 100 mm.

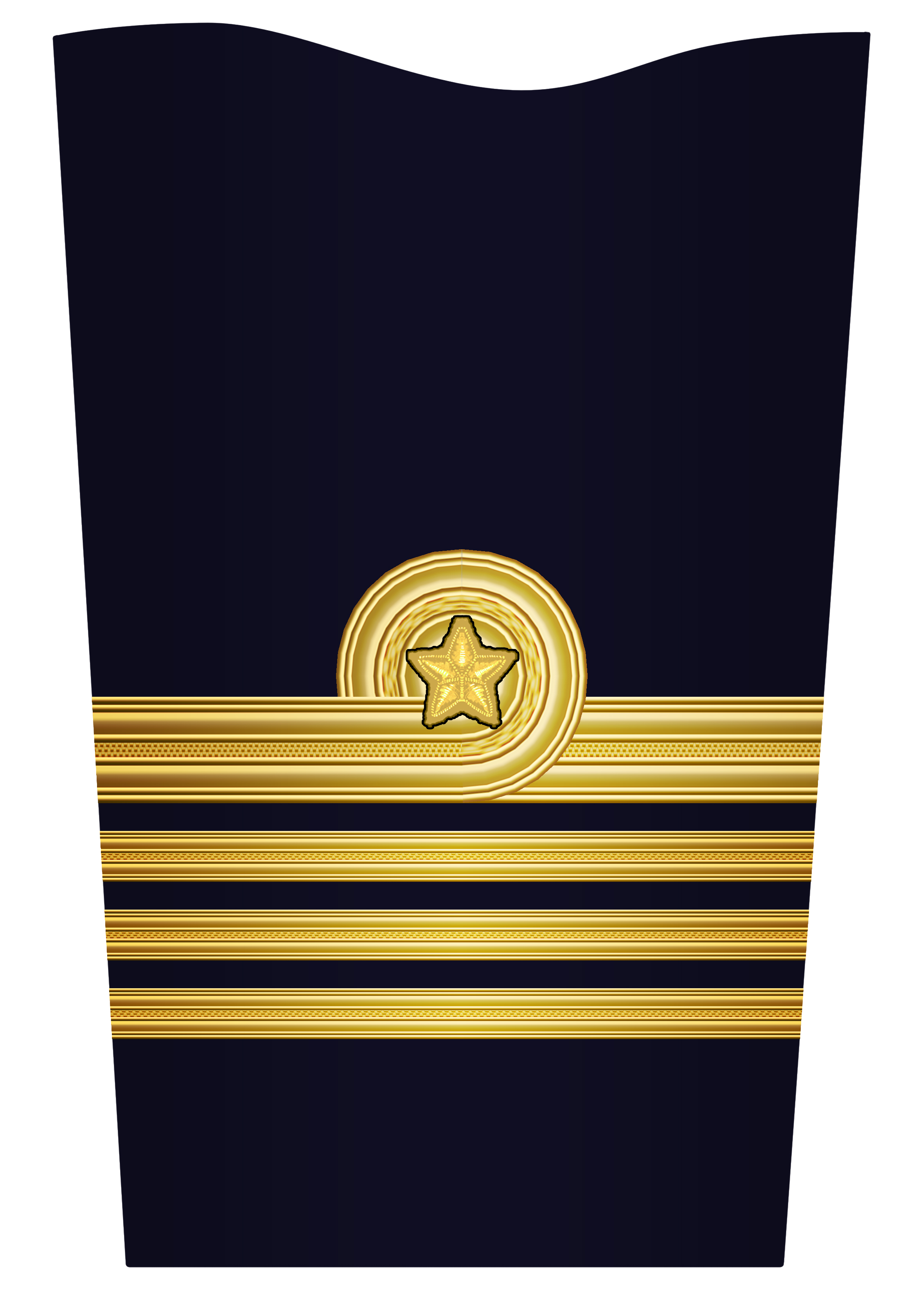
Sleeve insignia

=== Hats ===
==== Peaked cap ====
A senior captain wears as embellishments (known as scrambled egg) a gold embroidered laurel wreath (skärmbroderi m/49) on the visor of the peaked cap (skärmmössa m/48). It also fitted with a hat badge (mössmärke m/78 off för flottan) and with a strap in form of a golden braid (mössträns m/42).

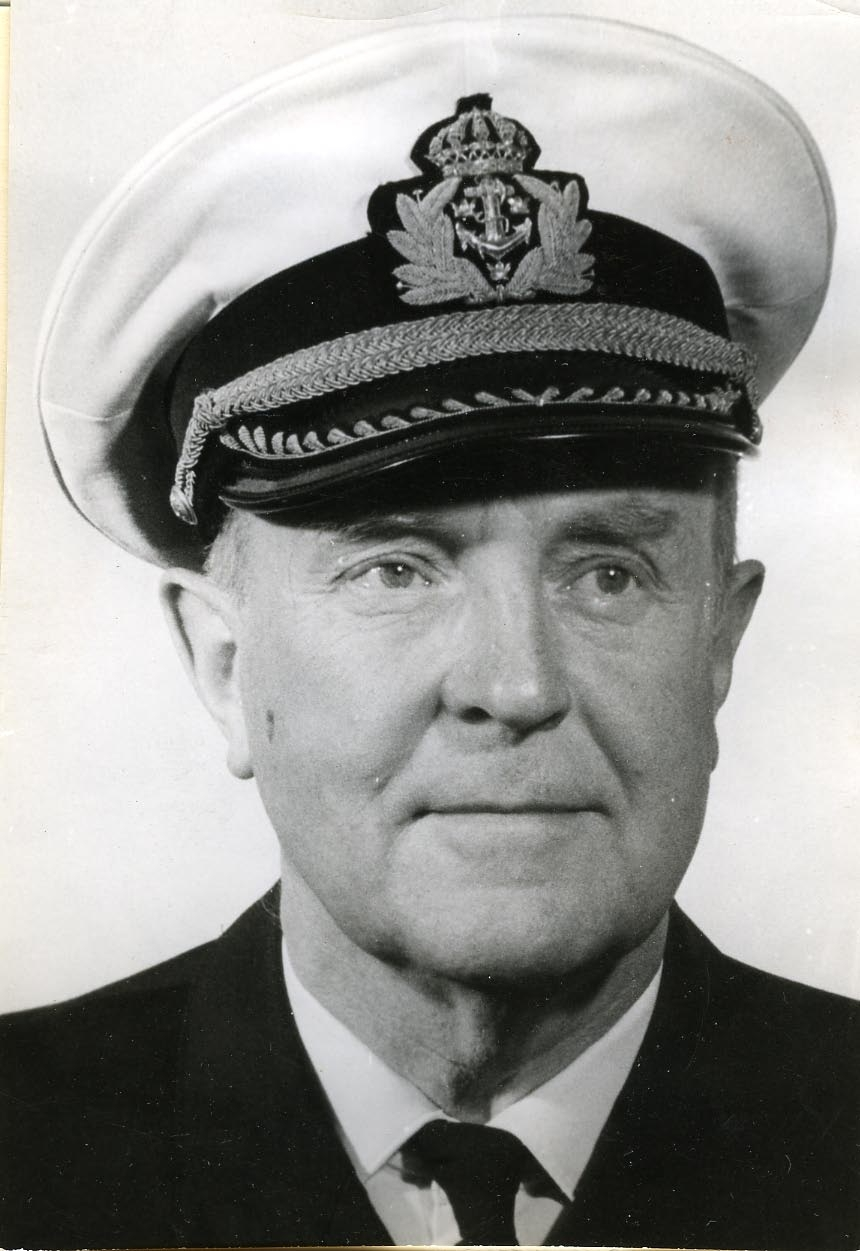
Peaked cap worn by Harry Bong.

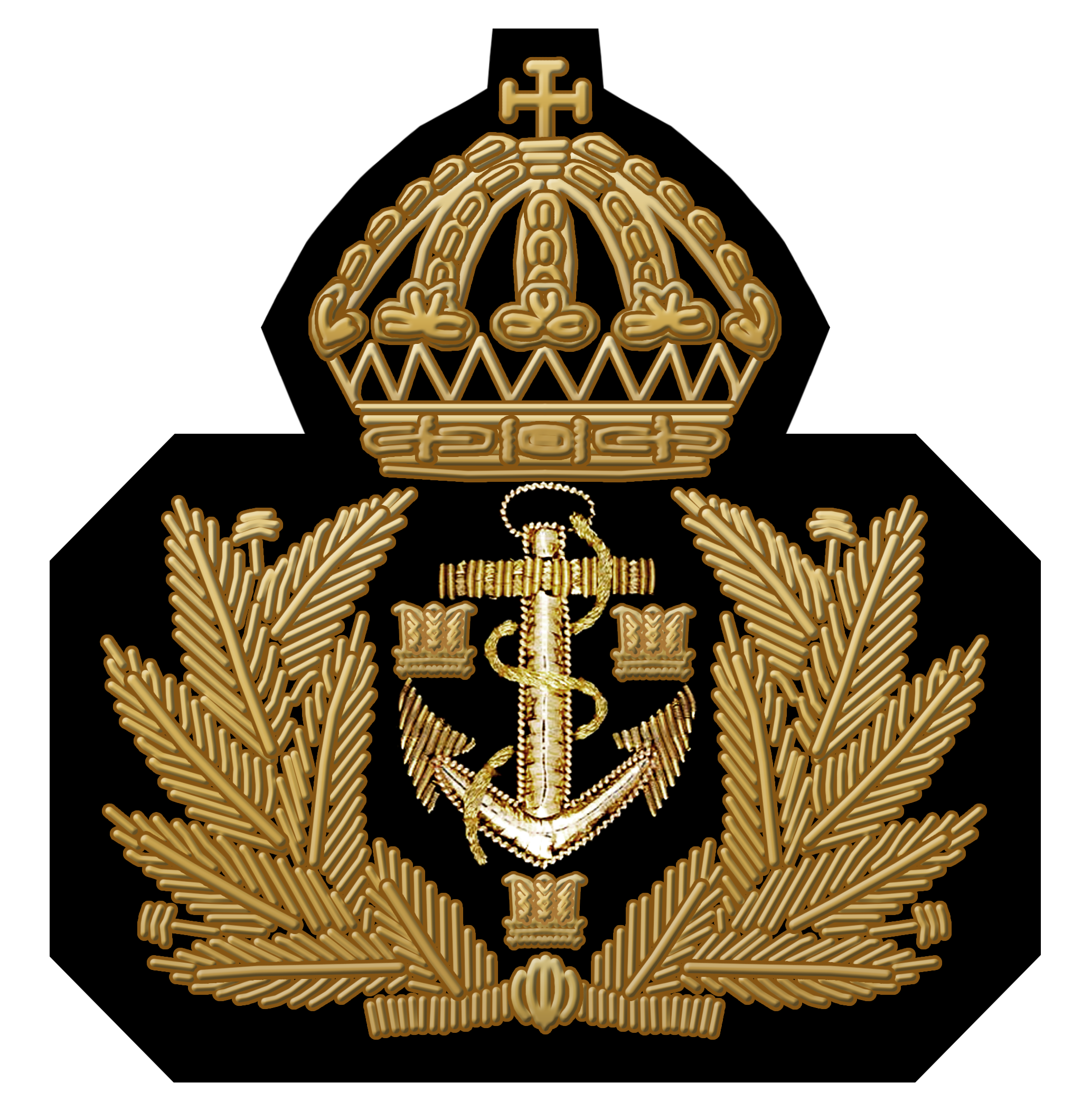
Hat badge

==== Side cap and winter hat ====
An officer wears a hat badge (mössmärke m/78 off) for the navy and another (mössmärke m/87 off) for amphibious units on the side cap (båtmössa m/48) and on the winter hat (vintermössa m/87).

=== Aiguillette ===
A senior captain wears a large aiguillette (stor ägiljett m/1816) to mess dress, service dress uniform in connection with representation (equivalent), and to full dress uniforms. For uniform parts without a shoulder strap (axelklaff), a shoulder girdle is used in the navy (if applicable with a royal name cipher) to attach a large aiguillette to the shoulder next to the shoulder seam. For the inner jacket (innerkavaj m/48) and the mess jacket, the aiguillette is attached to two small buttons under the coat.

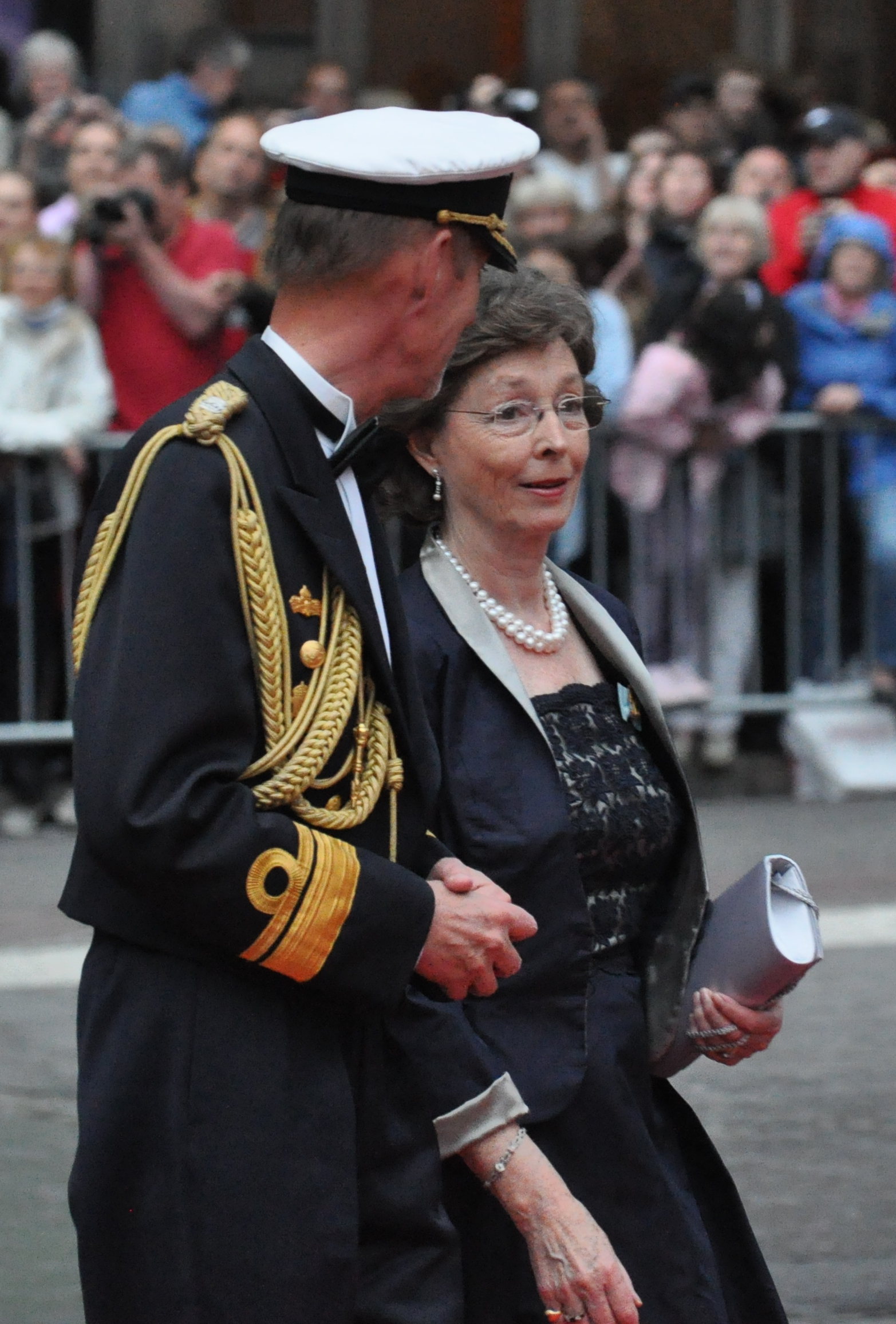
Large aiguillette (Stor ägiljett m/1816) on mess uniform

=== Epaulette ===
A senior captain wears epaulette's (epålett m/1878) to white tie (frack m/1878) and to coat (rock m/1878). On the epaulette, a senior captain wears 7 mm and 4 mm (within) fringe in two rows.
