= Flottiljamiral =

Rank in the Swedish Navy

Rear admiral (lower half) Flottiljamiral
- Flag of the rear admiral (lower half), Swedish Navy.

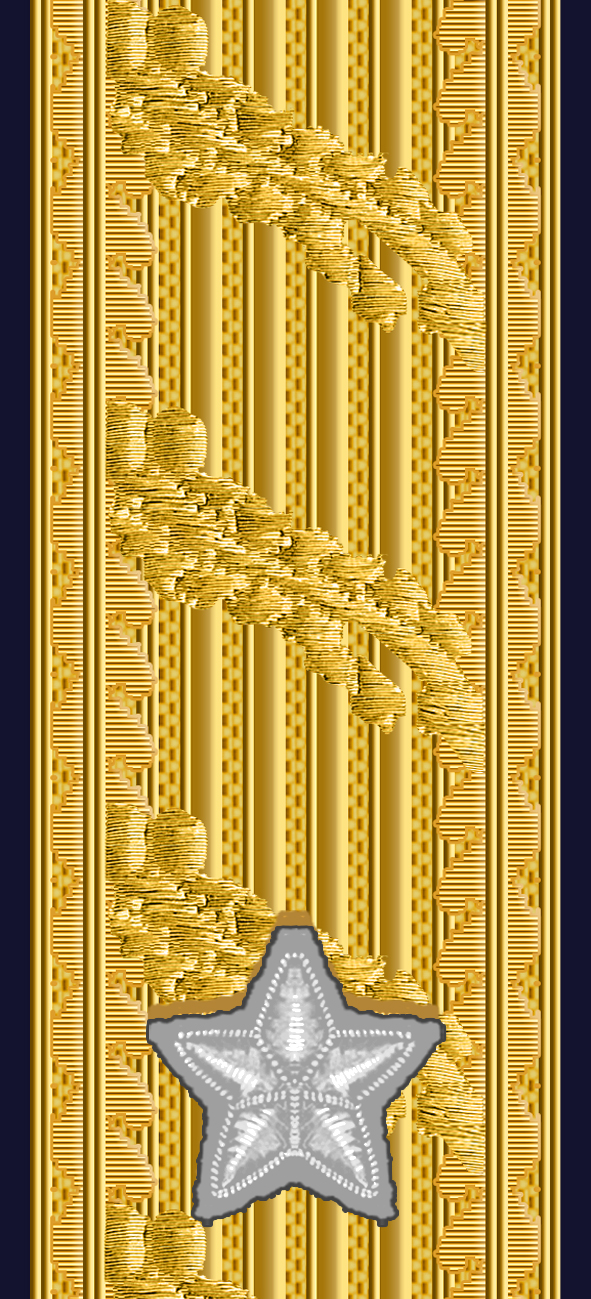
- Shoulder mark of a Swedish one-star rear admiral (lower half).

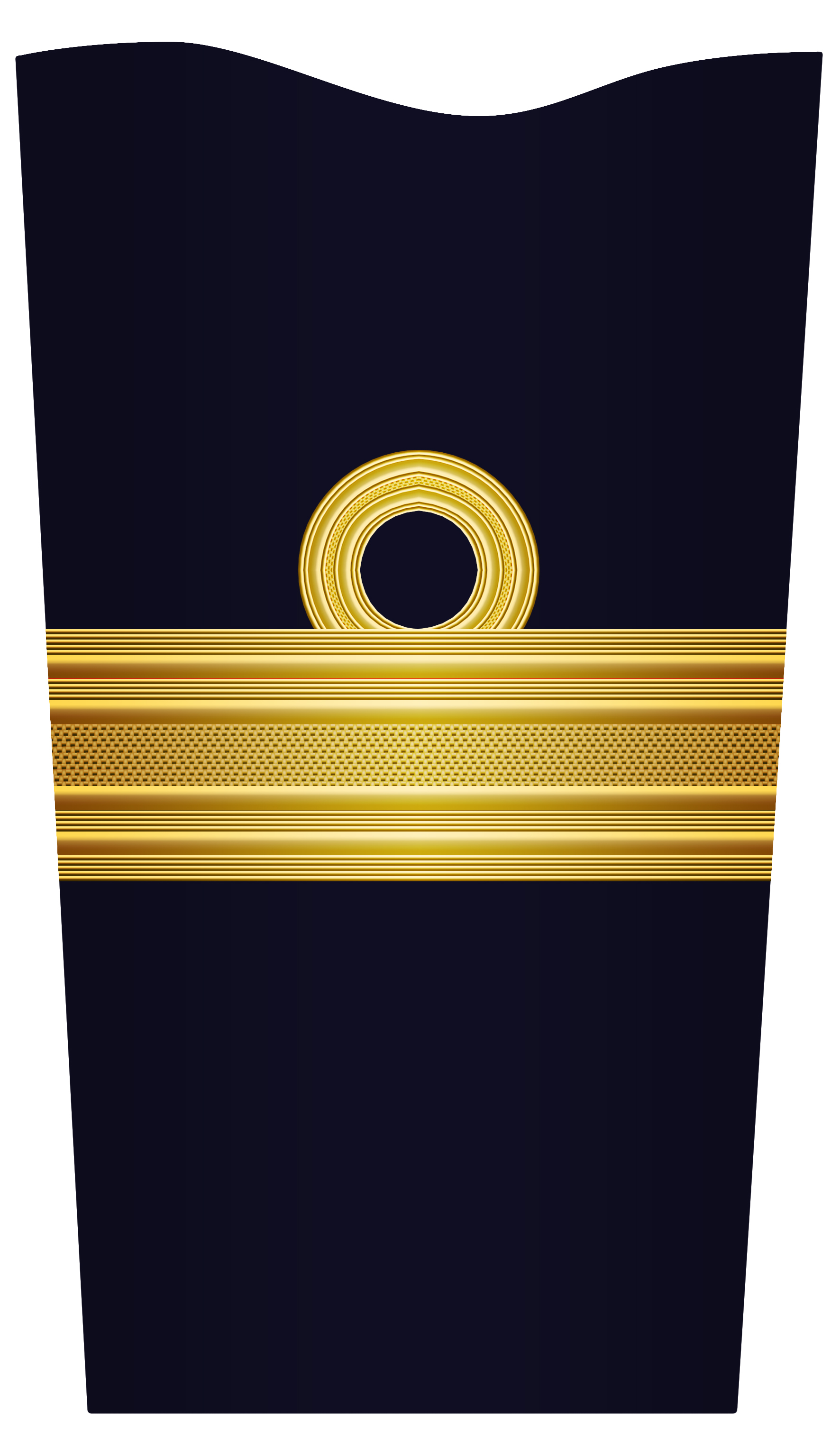
- Sleeve insignia of a Swedish one-star rear admiral (lower half).
- Country: Sweden
- Service branch: Swedish Navy
- Abbreviation: Fljam (Swedish), RAdm (English)
- Rank: One-star (Note: Rear admiral was a one-star rank in the Swedish Armed Forces rank structure until 1972.)
- NATO rank code: OF-06
- Non-NATO rank: O-7
- Formation: 2000
- Next higher rank: Rear admiral
- Next lower rank: Captain (Note: Senior captain is the actually the next lower rank but its obsolete since the introduction of the rear admiral (lower half) rank in 2000.)
- Equivalent ranks: Brigadier general

Rear admiral (lower half), abbreviated RAdm (Swedish: flottiljamiral, Fljam; lit. 'flotilla admiral') is a one-star flag officer in the Swedish Navy. Rear admiral (lower half) ranks above captain and below rear admiral. The rank is equivalent to brigadier general in the Swedish Army, Swedish Air Force and the Swedish Amphibious Corps.

== History ==
In 1972, the so-called employment reform (tjänstställningsreformen) was implemented. In connection with the Swedish Armed Forces' increasing involvement in international operations with UN battalions and observers, it became increasingly clear that the Swedish service system did not quite correspond to what was common in other countries. A Swedish captain had basically the same training and service as a major in other countries' defense forces. In many cases, a Swedish colonel had tasks that in other armed forces were performed by brigadier generals. During the 1960s, this was solved many times by the Swedish officers being given a higher rank during their service abroad. The Supreme Commander suggested to the Swedish government that the Swedish service system should be changed, so that the captains would receive the rank of major and the majors would receive the rank of lieutenant colonel. He further proposed that a new general, brigadier general, be introduced. The government approved the Supreme Commander's proposal regarding captains and majors. No new general rank was introduced. The motivation for the government not following the Supreme Commander's proposal in this respect was that it did not want to contribute to an increase in the number of generals and admirals in the Swedish Armed Forces. However, the government decided to introduce the rank of kommendör av 1. graden (senior captain) for the navy and överste av 1. graden (senior colonel) for the army. The reform was implemented on 1 July 1972.

During the 1990s, the Swedish government raised the issue of introducing a rank for professional officers called flotilla admiral and brigadier general, respectively, and stated there, among other things, the following. For a few years, the Swedish Armed Forces had in various ways announced that they wished to change the current rank level system for professional officers. The idea was that the rank of kommendör av 1. graden and överste av 1. graden would be abolished and instead replaced with the rank of rear admiral (lower half) and brigadier general. The reason for this was stated to be that then almost only Sweden did not have this rank. The increased international cooperation was thus considered to have been made more difficult. Denmark, Norway and Finland had recently introduced the brigadier general's rank. The government stated in the same bill that the issue should be prepared further before a position was taken on the proposal. In 1999, the government stated that the said rank should now be introduced and intended to make changes to the bill (1994:642) with instructions for the Swedish Armed Forces and the Officers Ordinance (1994:882) with effect from 1 July 2000.

The rank was finally introduced in 2000 and replaced the old rank of kommendör av 1. graden. Anyone who, according to older regulations, held the rank of kommendör av 1. graden would continue to hold that rank until otherwise decided. Thus, the rank of kommendör av 1. graden was placed between the rank of rear admiral and the rank of captain.

In everyday speech, rear admirals (lower half) are addressed as admirals.

== Promotion ==
Unlike rear admirals, vice admirals, major generals and lieutenant generals, which are appointed by the government, rear admirals (lower half) are appointed by the Swedish Armed Forces themselves. The Supreme Commander of the Swedish Armed Forces, or the person he or she decides, decides on promotion to rear admiral (lower half) according to Chapter 9, Section 1 of FFS 2018:7 (Swedish Armed Forces' regulations on promotion and constitution).

== Uniform ==
=== Shoulder mark ===
The shoulder mark of a Swedish rear admiral (lower half) contains a 45 mm galloon m/51 and one (Note: One star on the shoulder mark was used for a rear admiral between 1878 and 1972.) 25 mm star m/30 in silver embroidery on a white background.

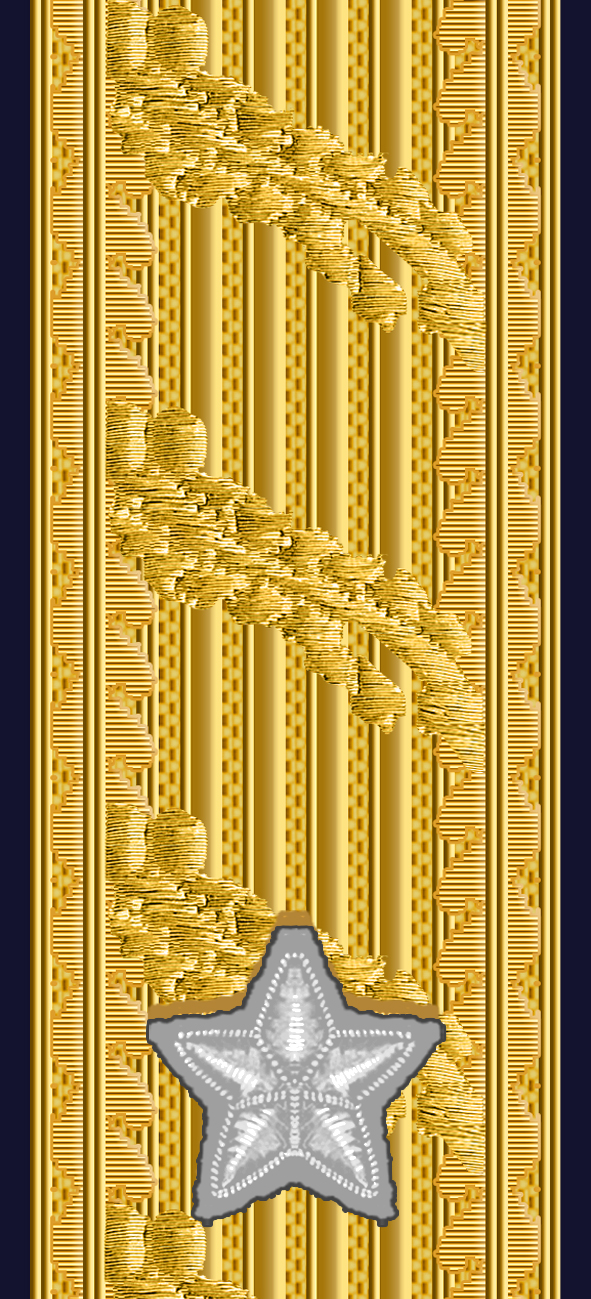
Shoulder mark

=== Sleeve insignia ===
A flag officer wears on the sleeves a 45 mm galloon (GALON M/51 45MM K) and a rank insignia (GRADBETECKNING M/02 TILL ÄRM FLOTTAN) (round loop, the Amphibious Corps has a pointed loop in form of a grenade). For a rear admiral (lower half), the loop is directly attached to the 45 mm gallon.

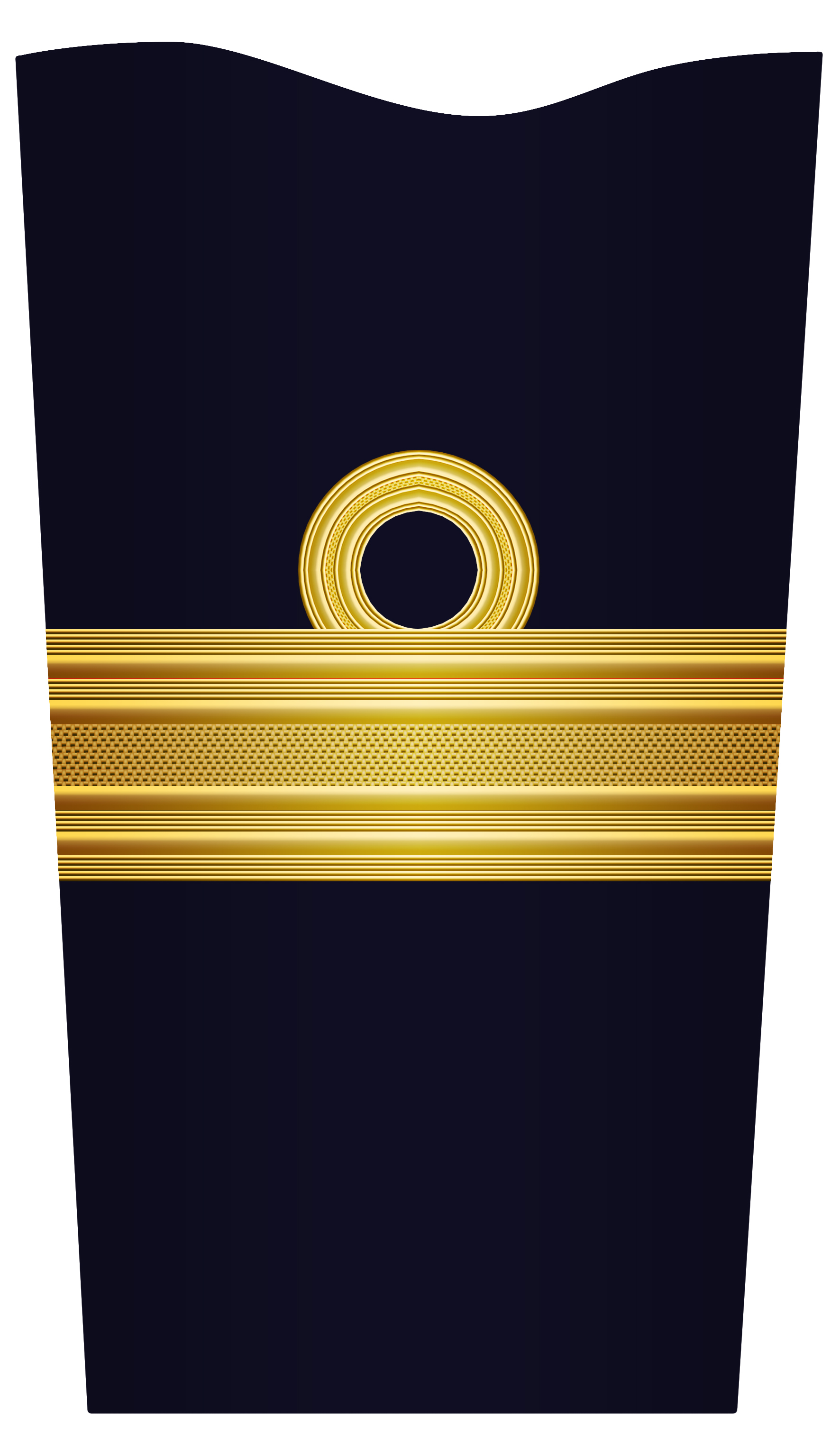
Sleeve insignia

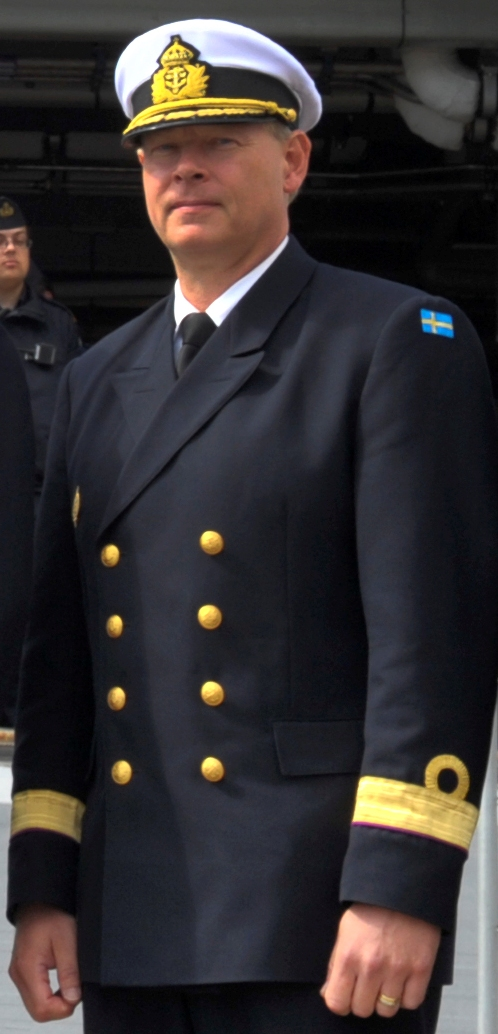
Rear admiral (lower half) Andreas Olsson showing sleeve insignia

=== Hats ===
==== Peaked cap ====
A flag officer wears as embellishments a gold embroidered oak leaf wreath (known as scrambled egg) on the visor of the peaked cap (skärmmössa m/48). It also fitted with a hat badge (mössmärke m/78 off för flottan) and with a strap in form of a golden braid.

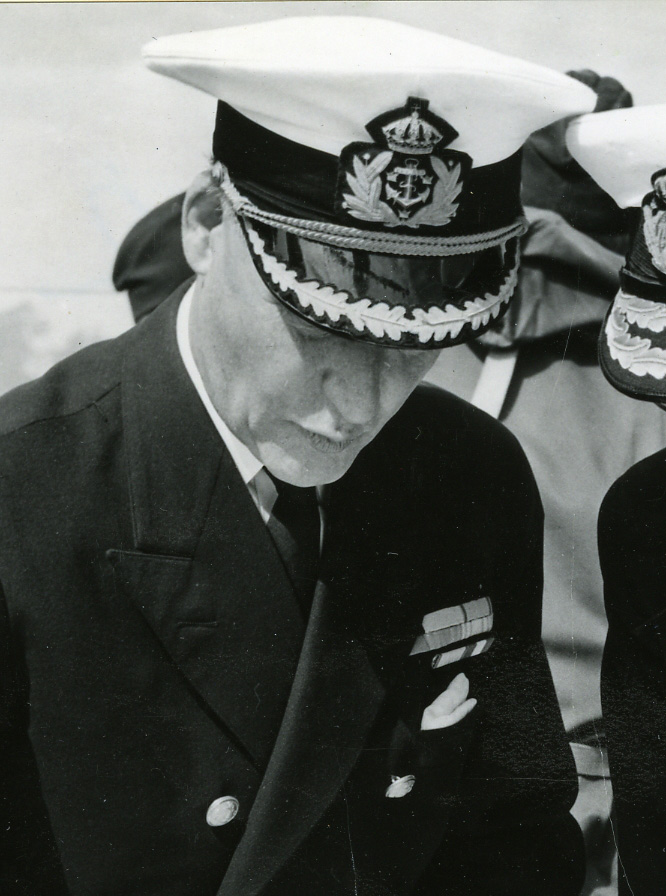
Peaked cap worn by Stig H:son Ericson.

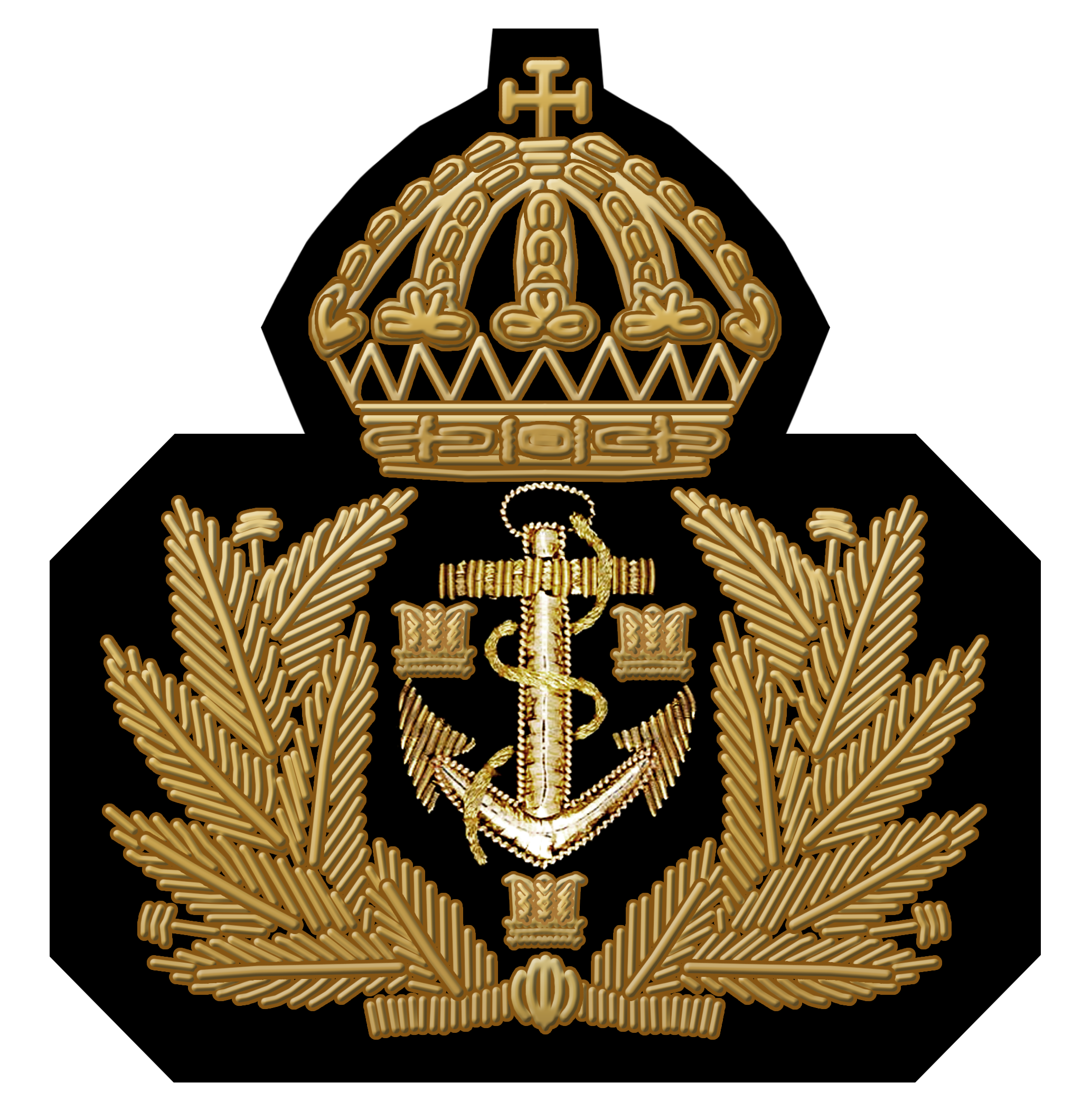
Hat badge

==== Side cap and winter hat ====
An officer wears a hat badge (mössmärke m/78 off) for the navy and another (mössmärke m/87 off) for amphibious units on the side cap (båtmössa m/48) and on the winter hat (vintermössa m/87).

== Personal flags ==
The command flag of a rear admiral (lower half) (and a brigadier general) is a double swallowtailed Swedish flag. In the first blue field 1 five-pointed white star.

A flag officer who holds the position of Supreme Commander, Chief of Operations, Chief of Navy, Chief of Maritime Component Command or naval force commander, may carry an admiral flag on a car in which the commander in question travels in uniform. On airplanes/helicopters, rear admirals (lower half) (flag officers) may carry a command sign in the form of an image of an admiral flag.

Rear admiral (lower half)/Brigadier general flag (Note: This one star flag was used for a rear admiral between 1905 and 1972.)
(2000–present)
