= Kårböle =

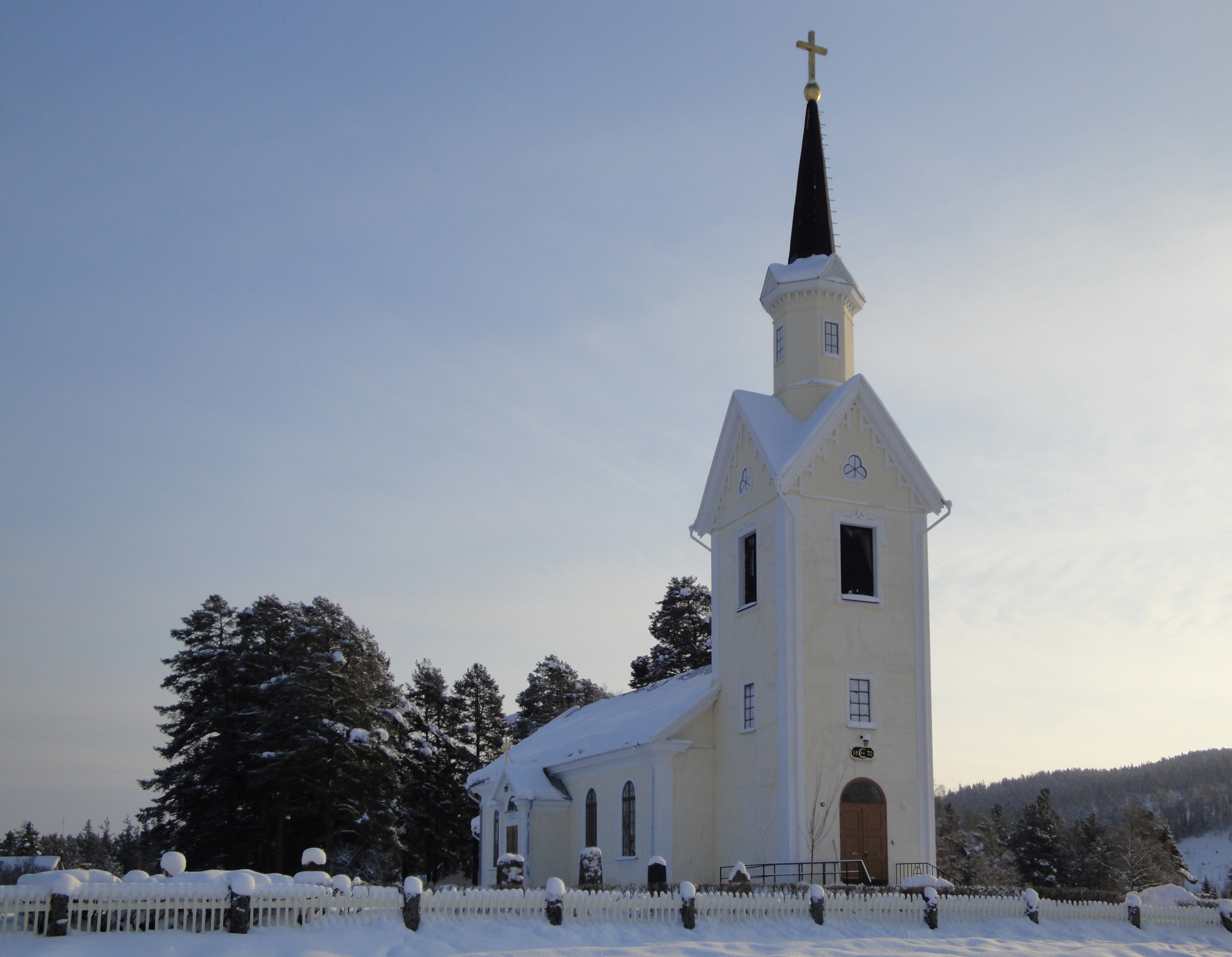
- Church in Kårböle

- Location within Sweden Gävleborg Location within Sweden
- Coordinates: 61°59′13″N 15°18′11″E
- Country: Sweden
- Province: Hälsingland
- County: Gävleborg
- Municipality: Ljusdal

Population (2015)
  - Total: 75
- Time zone: UTC+1 (CET)
  - Summer (DST): UTC+2 (CEST)

Kårböle is a village in Ljusdal Municipality, Hälsingland, Gävleborg County, Sweden.
