= 3rd Naval Warfare Flotilla (Sweden) =

Swedish naval unit

Coordinates: 56.157274°N 15.586295°E

- Tredje sjöstridsflottiljen
- Active: 1983–present
- Country: Sweden
- Branch: Swedish Navy
- Size: Flotilla
- Headquarters: Karlskrona Garrison, Blekinge
- Mottos: Prudentia et constantia (Note: Introduced in the 1970s for the 6th Mine Clearing Department (6. minröjningsavdelningen).) ("By prudence and constancy")
- March: "Svenska flottan" (Note: The march was adopted in 2005 when it was inherited from the 2nd Surface Warfare Flotilla (Andra ytstridsflottiljen).)

Commanders
- Commander: Capt (N) Bernt Andersson

The 3rd Naval Warfare Flotilla (Swedish: Tredje sjöstridsflottiljen or 3. sjöstridsflj) is a Swedish Navy flotilla located in the county of Blekinge, active since 1983. The flotilla is located at Karlskrona Garrison and shares its location with the 1st Submarine Flotilla.

== History ==
The flotilla was established on 1 January 1983 as the 4th Surface Attack Flotilla, formed from the remnants of the 1st Destroyer Flotilla and the 1st Patrol Boat Flotilla, which had been disbanded in the preceding years.

The process of establishing the flotilla was problematic. There was no space available onboard any vessel within the flotilla to accommodate the headquarters, so it had to be temporarily based on land. Additionally, the financial constraints faced by the Swedish Armed Forces at the time were further complicated by efforts to digitalize the navy's economic management. This shift to computerized systems made financial administration more difficult, as few personnel were familiar with the new technology.

== Organization ==
The 3rd Naval Warfare Flotilla is unique among non-amphibious naval units in that it includes the only missile unit of its kind. The unit, known as the 311th Missile Unit, operates a highly mobile anti-ship missile system primarily used to support naval forces in engagements with other vessels.

As of 2024, the peacetime organization of the 3rd Naval Warfare Flotilla is as follows:

- 3rd Naval Warfare Flotilla
  - 3rd Flotilla Staff
  - 31st Corvette Division
    - 311th Missile Unit
    - HSwMS Stockholm (P11)
    - HSwMS Malmö (P12)
    - HSwMS Härnösand (K33)
    - HSwMS Nyköping (K34)
    - HSwMS Karlstad (K35)
  - 33rd Mine Clearance Division
    - HSwMS Vinga (M75)
    - HSwMS Ulvön (M77)
    - HSwMS Sturkö (M14)
  - 34th Support Division
    - 34th Support Unit
    - HSwMS Carlskrona (P04)

== Heraldry and traditions ==
=== Coat of arms ===
The coat of arms of the 3rd Surface Attack Flotilla (Tredje ytattackflottiljen) 1997–1998 and 3rd Surface Warfare Flotilla (Tredje ytstridsflottiljen 1998–2004. Blazon: "Gules, a flash pointing down bendysinister argent, the first field charged with an erect crossbow and the second field with two triangles conjoined in pale, all or". The unit later adopted a new coat of arms.

Coat of arms of the 3rd Surface Attack Flotilla (Tredje ytattackflottiljen) 1997–1998 and 3rd Surface Warfare Flotilla (Tredje ytstridsflottiljen) 1998–2004.

Coat of arms of the 3rd Surface Warfare Flotilla (Tredje ytstridsflottiljen) and the 3rd Naval Warfare Flotilla (3. sjöstridsflottiljen).

=== Flag ===
The flag is a double swallow-tailed Swedish flag. It was presented to the then 3rd Surface Attack Flotilla by the Supreme Commander Owe Wiktorin at the Artillery Yard in Stockholm on 30 April 1996.

== Commanders ==
- 1983–1984: Captain Lennart Grenstad
- 1984–1985: Captain Lars Thomasson
- 1985–1988: Captain Frank Rosenius
- 1988–1989: Captain Torsten Lindh
- 1990–1993: Captain Sölve Larsby
- 1994–1997: Captain Magnus Waldenström
- 1997–1999: Captain Tommy Åsman
- 1999–2001: Captain Jörgen Ericsson
- 2001–2002: Captain Leif Nylander
- 2003–2005: Captain Anders Grenstad
- 2005–2008: Captain Erik Andersson
- 2008–2011: Captain Anders Olovsson
- 2012–2015: Captain Magnus Jönsson
- 2016–2018: Captain Bengt Lundgren
- 2018–2021: Captain Per Edling
- 2021–2023: Captain Jenny Ström
- 2023–present: Captain Bernt Andersson

== Attributes ==
Name	Translation	From		To
4. ytattackflottiljen	4th Surface Attack Flotilla	1983-01-01	–	1994-06-30
3. ytattackflottiljen	3rd Surface Attack Flotilla	1994-07-01	–	1997-12-31
3. ytstridsflottiljen	3rd Surface Warfare Flotilla	1998-01-01	–	2005-08-31
3. sjöstridsflottiljen	3rd Naval Warfare Flotilla	2005-09-01	–	
Designation		From		To
4. yaflj		1983-01-01	–	1994-06-30
3. yaflj		1994-07-01	–	1997-12-31
3. ysflj		1998-01-01	–	2005-08-31
3. sjöstridsflj		2005-09-01	–	
Location		From		To
Karlskrona Naval Base		1983-01-01	–	
