= Galloon =

Decorated woven or braided fabric trim

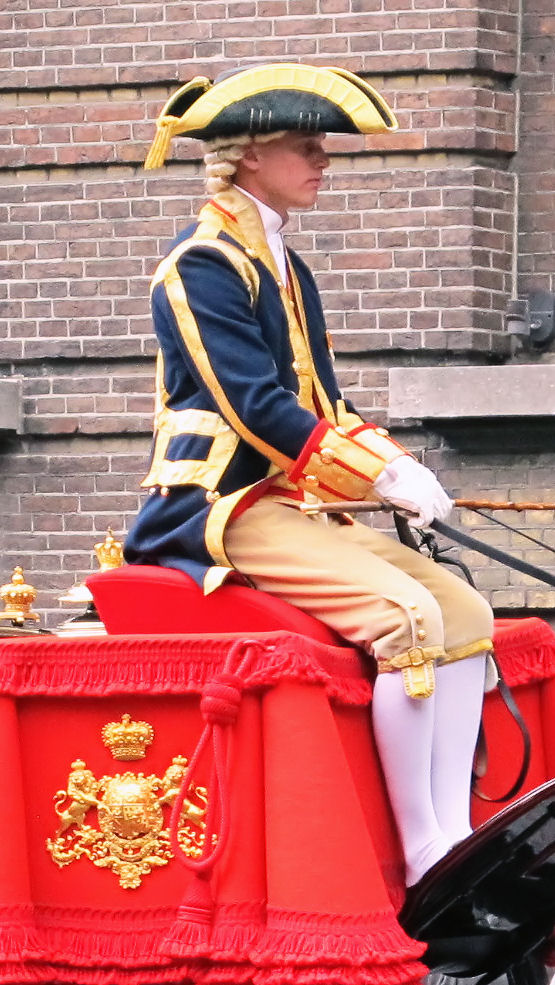
- Gold galloon trim on the cuffs, pockets, seams and tricorn hat, as worn at the Dutch court
- Type: Decorative woven trim
- Material: Metallic gold or silver thread, lace, or embroidery

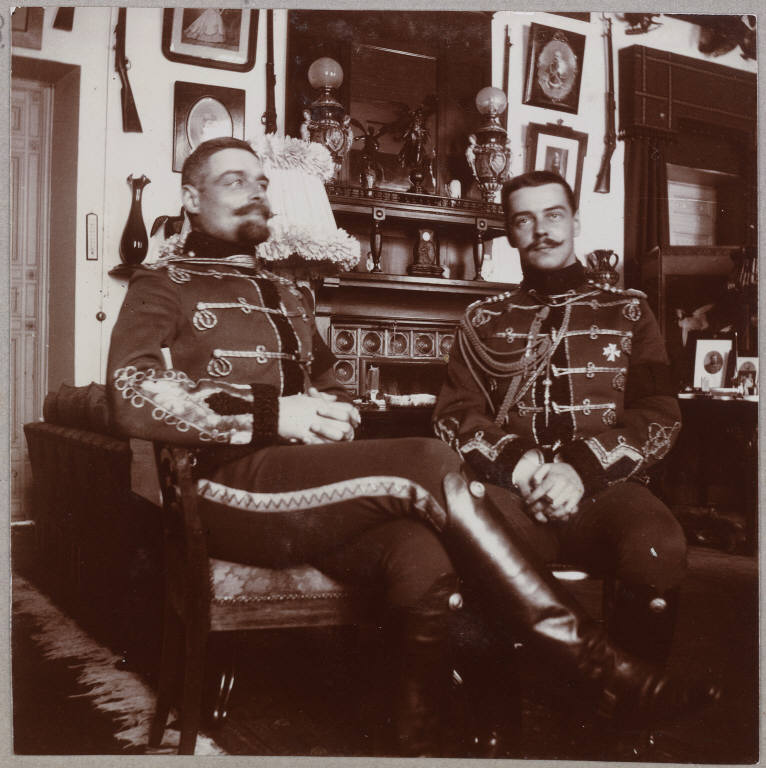
Galloon trim on the cuffs and chest of a c. 1908 Russian court uniform

Galloon (sometimes spelled galon in British English) is a heavily-decorated woven or braided trim, typically made of, or featuring, gold or silver thread, which may be woven or embroidered. Galloon trim is used in the trim of military and police uniforms, ecclesiastical dress, and as trim on textiles, drapery, and upholstery. Galloon trim may also come in the form of lace, and is typically wide.

In formal evening wear, a non-military usage, this decoration has evolved into satin stripes that conceal the outer seam of men's dress trousers.

The distinction between galloon trim or braid, ribbon, and belting has not always been clear, and a great deal of overlap has occasionally caused problems in classification.

== Etymology ==
The term galloon stems from the French galon, in turn itself from the verb galloner, "to braid".

== Gallery ==
Examples of gallon braid, trim and lace
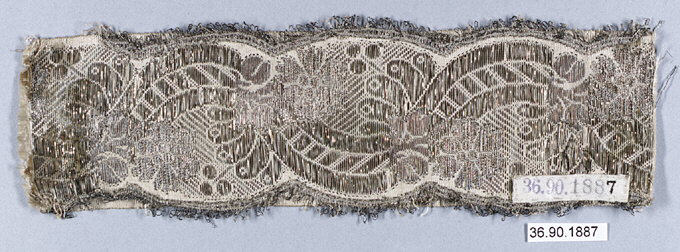
Metallic galloon lace in silk and metal thread

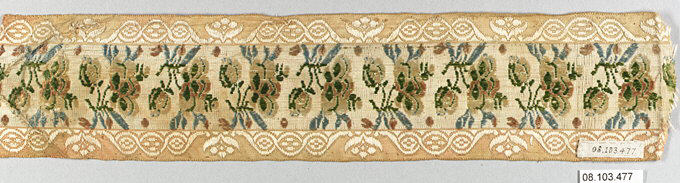
Woven floral galloon trim

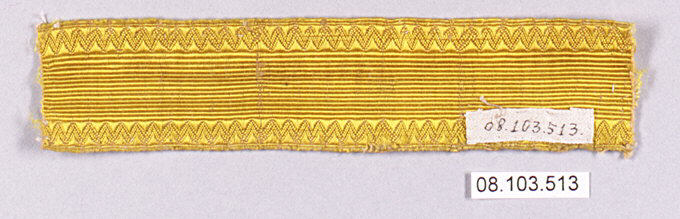
Golden silk and cotton galloon trim
