= HSwMS Carlskrona (P04) =

Swedish minelayer and ocean patrol vessel

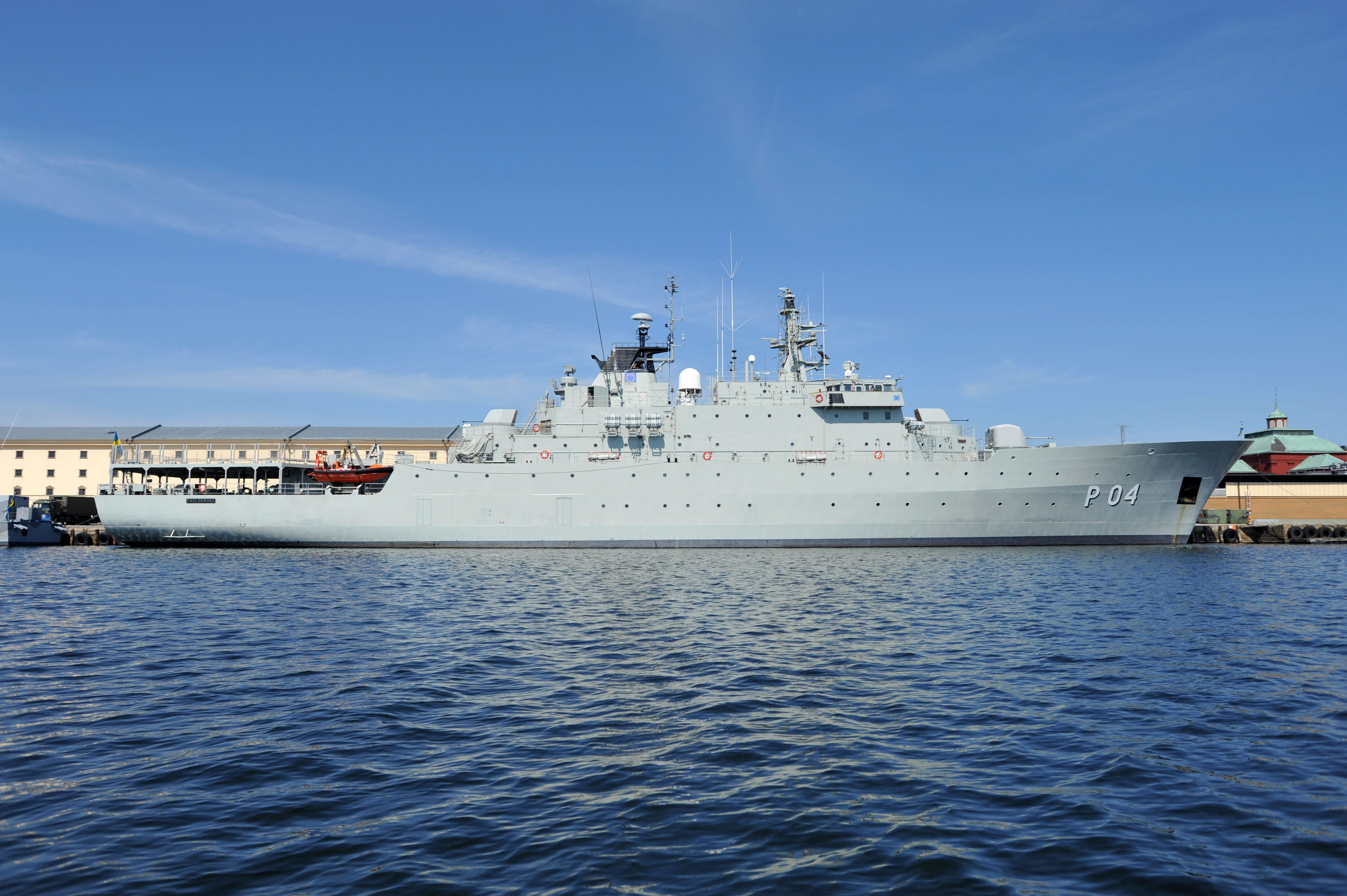
- HSwMS Carlskrona

History

Sweden
- Name: Carlskrona
- Builder: Karlskronavarvet, Karlskrona
- Launched: 28 June 1980
- Commissioned: 11 January 1982
- Identification: MMSI number: 265170000; Callsign: SKFQ; Pennant number: M04 (1980–2009); P04 (2009–present)
- Status: In service
- Badge

General characteristics
- Type: Patrol vessel
- Displacement: 3,150 tonnes (3,100 long tons)
- Length: 105.7 m (346 ft 9 in)
- Beam: 15.2 m (49 ft 10 in)
- Draft: 4.7 m (15 ft 5 in)
- Speed: 20 knots (37 km/h; 23 mph)
- Complement: 45 officers; 40 cadets; 85 conscripts
- Sensors & processing systems: 2 x fire control radars with IR/TV sights
- Armament: 2 x Bofors 40 mm Automatic Gun
- Aircraft carried: 1 x AW109LUH (HKP15B)
- Aviation facilities: 1 Helipad

HSwMS Carlskrona (in Swedish: HMS Carlskrona) is the longest vessel in the Swedish Navy at 105.7 metres (346 ft 9 in). Only Belos, the submarine rescue vessel, has a greater displacement. She was originally designed as a minelayer and is also used for exercise expeditions. She replaced HSwMS Älvsnabben in both roles.

== Construction and career ==
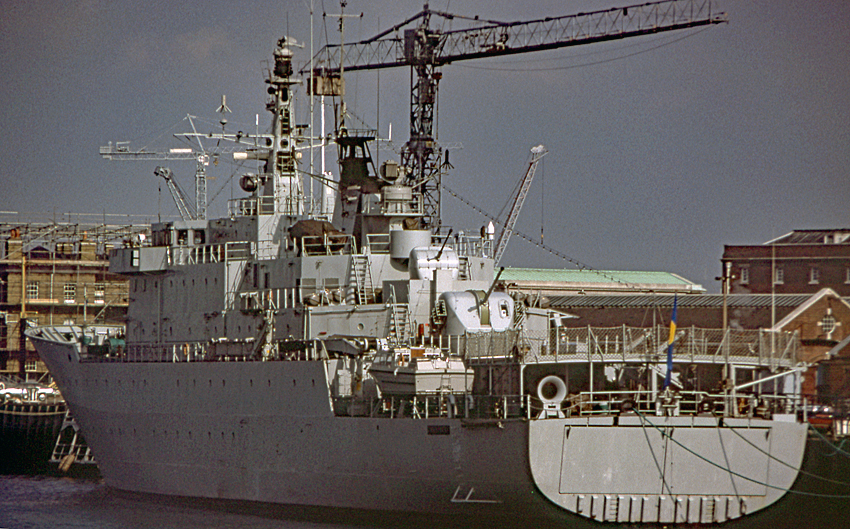
Carlskrona in its original role as a minelayer, visiting Portsmouth in 1984

Carlskrona was built by the Karlskrona shipyard, the largest ship ever built there. Not only was the ship designed as a minelayer but she was also constructed to be used as the Swedish Navy's long-travel ship.

The launch took place on 28 May 1980 with 3,000 guests, where the king, Carl XVI Gustaf, christened the ship. A music corps and ceremonial company was included in ceremony and among the guests were Defense Minister Eric Krönmark, the Chief of the Navy, Vice Admiral Per Rudberg and the Director General of the Defence Materiel Administration Ove Ljung. On 19 March 1982 the ship was delivered to the navy, where she replaced HSwMS Älvsnabben (M01) as the long travel ship.

During the Cold War, large minelayers like Carlskrona were very important in the Swedish defence strategy, causing the ship to be without a role after the restructuring of the Swedish Armed Forces in the early 2000s. Carlskrona was refitted in 2002. The refit left the ship fit for active service until at least 2018–20. In 2009–2010 she was modified for the Ocean Patrol Vessel (OPV) role and redesignated from M to P (P04). Carlskrona took part in the EUNAVFOR operation in the Gulf of Aden (Somalia) in 2010. She left the naval base at Karlskrona, Sweden on 13 March 2010, and commenced her mission as HQ ship for the EU operation on 15 April.

On 6 May 2016 Carlskrona collided with the ferry Yxlan outside Karlskrona in the Baltic Sea. The ship received minor damage and returned to active duty only ten days later.

In August 2016 the ship was dry-docked to give the ship a 10-year extension refit that will extend its service life to 2025. The ship was handed back to the Swedish Navy on 16 June 2017.

Both the 57 mm guns were removed. The aft gun was removed when the helicopter pad was expanded and the forward gun was removed in 2007 as it was of an older type that was no longer used on any other ships in the Swedish Navy.

On 13 May 2022, Carlskrona took part in a PASSEX training with the Finnish and American navies in the northern Baltic Sea.
