= Chief of Navy (Sweden) =

Most senior appointment in the Swedish Navy

- Marinchef
- Command flag of the Chief of Navy.
- Incumbent; Rear Admiral Johan Norlén since 14 November 2024
- Swedish Navy
- Abbreviation: MC
- Member of: Swedish Armed Forces Headquarters
- Reports to: Chief of Armed Forces Training & Procurement
- Seat: Lidingövägen 24, Stockholm, Sweden
- Nominator: Minister for Defence
- Appointer: The Government
- Constituting instrument: FIB 2020:5, Chapter 13 a
- Formation: 1936
- First holder: Charles de Champs
- Deputy: Deputy Chief of Navy

The Chief of Navy (Swedish: marinchef, MC) is the most senior appointment in the Swedish Navy. The position Chief of Navy was introduced in 1936 and the current form in 2014.

== History ==
Until 1936 the Swedish monarch was the Supreme Commander of the Swedish Armed Forces and had formally maintained the Chief of the Navy position together with the Chief of the Military Office of the Minister of Defence in the Ministry of Defence, which is in fact maintained the position. The position of a single professional "Chief of the Navy" (Swedish: Chefen för marinen, CM) was established in 1936 in accordance with the Defence Act of 1936. The position of Chief of the Navy existed from 1936 to 1994 and during this time it was his responsibility to lead the navy units production and development. During the period 1936 to 1961 the Chief of the Navy also had an operational commanding responsibility for the naval forces.

Following a larger reorganization of the Swedish Armed Forces in 1994, the staff agency Chief of the Navy ceased to exist as an independent agency. Instead, the post Chief of Navy Command (Swedish: Chefen för marinledningen) was created at the then newly instituted Swedish Armed Forces Headquarters. In 1998, the Swedish Armed Forces was again reorganized. Most of the duties of the Chief of Navy Command were transferred to the newly instituted post of "Inspector General of the Navy" (Swedish: Generalinspektören för marinen). The post is similar to that of the "Inspector General of the Swedish Army" (Swedish: Generalinspektören för armén) and the "Inspector General of the Swedish Air Force" (Swedish: Generalinspektören för flygvapnet). It was later renamed to "Inspector of the Navy" (Swedish: Marininspektören) on 1 January 2003.

On 1 January 2014, the "Chief of Navy" (Swedish: Marinchefen, MC) position was reinstated in the Swedish Armed Forces. The position has not the same duties as before.

== Tasks ==
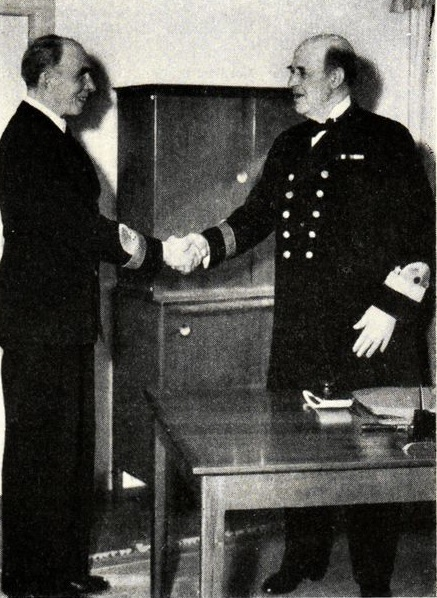
The newly-appointed chief, Vice Admiral Helge Strömbäck (left) shakes hand with the departing Vice Admiral Fabian Tamm, 1 April 1945.

Tasks of the Chief of Navy:

- Lead the units which the Chief of Swedish Armed Forces Training and Development has distributed
- To the Chief of Swedish Armed Forces Training and Development propose the development of the units' abilities
- Being the foremost representative of the units
- Represent the units and the area of ability in international contacts

== Heraldry ==
A command flag of the Chief of Navy, drawn by Brita Grep and embroidered by hand by the company Libraria, was introduced during the reign of Gustaf VI Adolf (1950–1973). Blazon: "Fessed in yellow and blue; on yellow two blue batons of command with sets of yellow crowns placed two and one in saltire, on blue an anchor erect cabled over two gun barrels of older pattern in saltire, all yellow."

A new command flag manufactured by Handarbetets Vänner Ateljé, which is a subcontractor to the Swedish Army Museum, was completed in 2020. The flag is embroidered by Jennie Jakobsson and Katarina Öberg. Parts of the preparatory work were done by Anna Eriksson and printed by Marie-Louise Sjöblom. The model drawing was made by Henrik Dahlström, who previously served at the National Archives of Sweden and who is now a heraldic artist and graphic designer at the Swedish Armed Forces Headquarters. The new command flag was nailed in solemn forms at the Maritime Museum in Stockholm on 10 September 2021 with six former Chiefs of Navy: Vice Admiral Dick Börjesson (1990–1994), Vice Admiral Peter Nordbeck (1994–1998), Rear Admiral Anders Grenstad (2005–2011), Vice Admiral Jan Thörnqvist (2011–2016), Rear Admiral Jens Nykvist (2016–2020), and the then Chief of Navy, Rear Admiral Ewa Skoog Haslum (2020–2024).

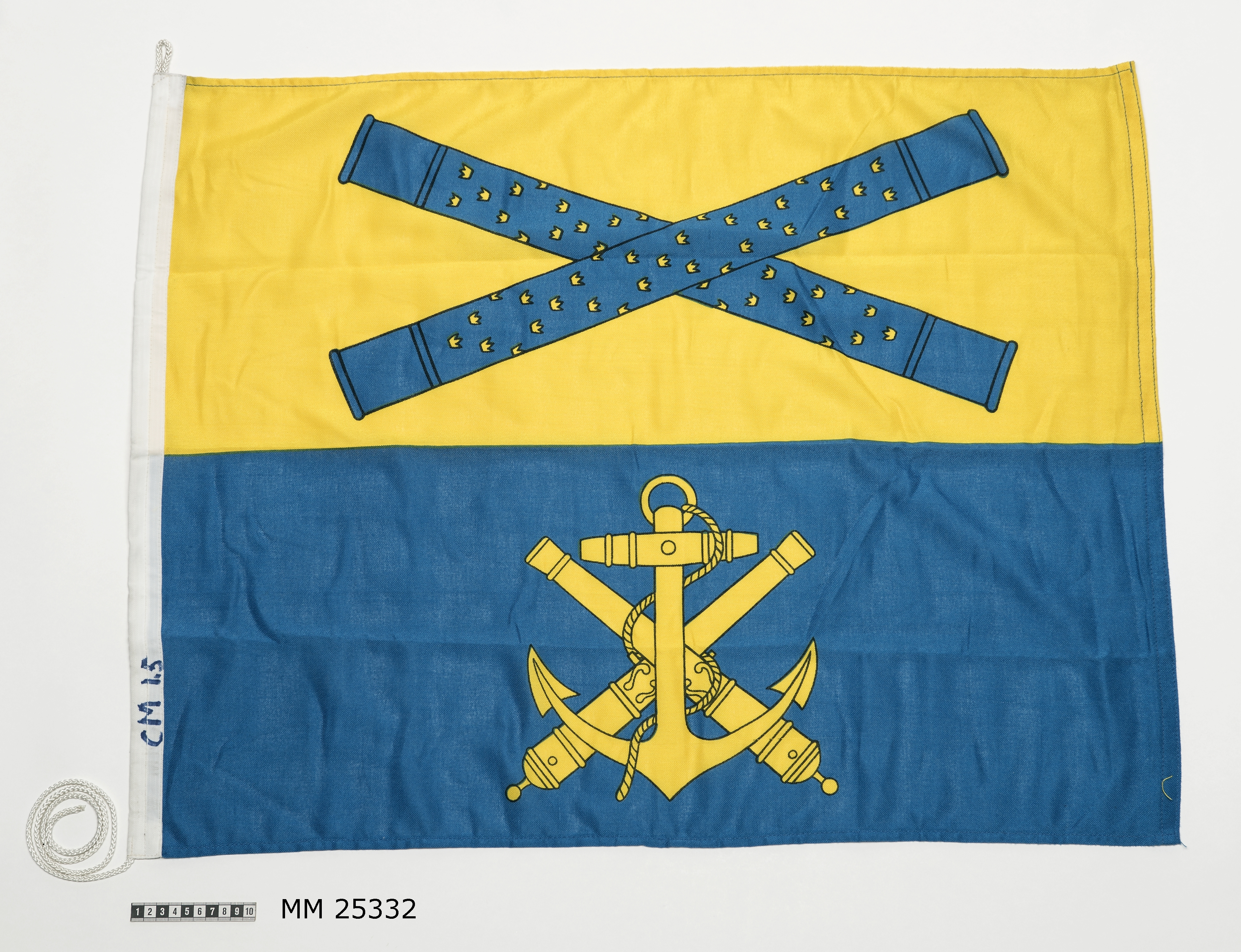
Command flag of the Chief of Navy.

Command sign of the Chief of Navy.

== List of chiefs ==
No.	Portrait	Name	Took office	Left office	Time in office	Ref.
Chief of the Navy (Chefen för marinen)
1	Charles de Champs	Vice admiral Charles de Champs (1873–1959)	1936	1 April 1939	2–3 years	
2	Fabian Tamm	Vice admiral Fabian Tamm (1879–1955)	1 April 1939	31 March 1945	5 years, 364 days	
3	Helge Strömbäck	Vice admiral Helge Strömbäck (1889–1960)	1 April 1945	30 September 1953	8 years, 182 days	
4	Stig H:son Ericson	Vice admiral Stig H:son Ericson (1897–1985)	1 October 1953	1961	7–8 years	
5	Åke Lindemalm	Vice admiral Åke Lindemalm (1910–2004)	1 October 1961	30 September 1970	8–9 years	
6	Bengt Lundvall	Vice admiral Bengt Lundvall (1915–2010)	1 October 1970	30 September 1978	7 years, 364 days	
7	Per Rudberg	Vice admiral Per Rudberg (1922–2010)	1 October 1978	30 September 1984	5 years, 365 days	
8	Bengt Schuback	Vice admiral Bengt Schuback (1928–2015)	1 October 1984	30 September 1990	5 years, 364 days	
9	Dick Börjesson	Vice admiral Dick Börjesson (born 1938)	1 October 1990	30 June 1994	3 years, 272 days	
Chief of Navy Command (Chef för marinledningen)
10	Peter Nordbeck	Vice admiral Peter Nordbeck (born 1938)	1 July 1994	1 July 1998	4 years, 0 days	
Inspector General of the Navy (Generalinspektör för marinen)
11	Torsten Lindh	Rear admiral Torsten Lindh (1941–2020)	1 July 1998	2001	2–3 years	
12	Jörgen Ericsson	Rear admiral Jörgen Ericsson (born 1953)	1 October 2001	31 December 2002	1 year, 91 days	
Inspector of the Navy (Marininspektör)
12	Jörgen Ericsson	Rear admiral Jörgen Ericsson (born 1953)	1 January 2003	2005	1–2 years	
13	Anders Grenstad	Rear admiral Anders Grenstad (born 1958)	1 July 2005	2011	5–6 years	
14	Jan Thörnqvist	Rear admiral Jan Thörnqvist (born 1959)	1 March 2011	2013	1–2 years	
Chief of Navy (Marinchef)
14	Jan Thörnqvist	Rear admiral Jan Thörnqvist (born 1959)	1 January 2014	18 April 2016	2 years, 108 days	
15	Jens Nykvist	Rear admiral Jens Nykvist (born 1968)	4 May 2016	21 January 2020	3 years, 262 days	
16	Ewa Skoog Haslum	Rear admiral Ewa Skoog Haslum (born 1968)	21 January 2020	14 November 2024	4 years, 298 days	
17	Johan Norlén	Rear admiral Johan Norlén (born 1971)	14 November 2024	Incumbent	1 year, 297 days	

== List of deputy chiefs ==
Portrait	Name	Took office	Left office	Time in office	Defence branch	Ref.
Deputy Inspector General of the Navy (Ställföreträdande generalinspektör för marinen)
Stellan Fagrell	Senior colonel Stellan Fagrell (1943–2022)	1998	2001	2–3 years	Navy (Amphibious Corps)	
Vacant	Vacant	2001	2003	1–2 years	-	
Deputy Chief of Navy (Ställföreträdande marinchef)
Anders Olovsson	Rear admiral (lower half); Anders Olovsson (born 1967)	?	?	-	Navy	
Peder Ohlsson	Brigadier general Peder Ohlsson (born 1962)	20 March 2020	August 2022	1–2 years	Navy (Amphibious Corps)	
Patrik Gardesten	Brigadier general Patrik Gardesten (born 1967)	1 September 2022	May 2025	2–3 years	Navy (Amphibious Corps)	
Fredrik Herlitz	Brigadier general Fredrik Herlitz (born 1973)	17 June 2025	Incumbent	1 year, 82 days	Navy (Amphibious Corps)	

== See also ==
- Chief of Army (Sweden)
- Chief of Air Force (Sweden)
