= Swedish Navy =

Naval branch of the Swedish Armed Forces

- Svenska marinen
- Coat of arms of the Swedish Navy.
- Founded: 7 June 1522 (504 years, 5 months)
- Country: Sweden
- Type: Navy
- Size: 2,100
- Part of: Swedish Armed Forces
- Garrison/HQ: Muskö
- March: "Kungliga Flottans paradmarsch" (Wagner)
- Anniversaries: 9 July (Battle of Svensksund)
- Equipment: List of equipment
- Engagements: See list: Swedish War of Liberation (1521–1523); Count's Feud (1534–1536); Russo-Swedish War (1554–1557); Northern Seven Years' War (1563–1570); Russo-Swedish War (1590–1595); Polish–Swedish War (1600–1629); Ingrian War (1610–1617); Kalmar War (1611–1613); Thirty Years' War (1630–1648); Torstenson War (1643–1645); Northern War of 1655–1660; Scanian War (1675–1679); Great Northern War (1700–1721); Russo-Swedish War (1741–1743); Seven Years' War (1756–1763); Russo-Swedish War (1788–1790); First Barbary War (1801–1802); War of the Fourth Coalition (1805–1810); Finnish War (1808–1809); Dano-Swedish War of 1808–1809; Swedish–Norwegian War (1814); Invasion of Åland (1918); War in Afghanistan (2002–2021); Operation Atalanta (since 2008)

Commanders
- Chief of Navy: RAdm Johan Norlén
- Deputy Chief of Navy: BGen Patrik Gardesten
- Chief of the Naval Staff: Capt Håkan Nilsson

Insignia
- Naval ensign and jack

The Swedish Navy (Swedish: Svenska marinen) is the maritime service branch of the Swedish Armed Forces. It is composed of surface and submarine naval units – the Fleet (Flottan), sometimes formally referred to as the Royal Navy (Kungliga Flottan) – as well as marine units, the Amphibious Corps (Amfibiekåren).

Founded under King Gustav Vasa in 1522, the Swedish navy is one of the oldest continuously serving navies in the world, celebrating its 500th anniversary in 2022.

== History ==
Early Swedish kings (c. 9th–14th centuries) organised a Swedish Navy along the coastline through ledungen. This involved combined rowing and sailing ships (without artillery). This system became obsolete with the development of society and changes in military technology. No later than in the 14th century, the duty to serve in ledungen was replaced by a tax. In 1427, when Sweden was part of the Kalmar Union (with Denmark and Norway), Swedish warships did however participate in the naval battle of Öresund against the Hanseatic League. It is unclear how this force was organised and exactly on what basis.

On 7 June 1522, one year after the separation of Sweden from the Kalmar Union, Gustav Vasa purchased a number of ships from the Hanseatic town of Lübeck. Official Swedish histories since the 19th century have often recorded this day as the birth of the current Swedish Navy. The museum ship Vasa in Stockholm was a 17th-century ship of the Royal Swedish Navy (Kungliga flottan).

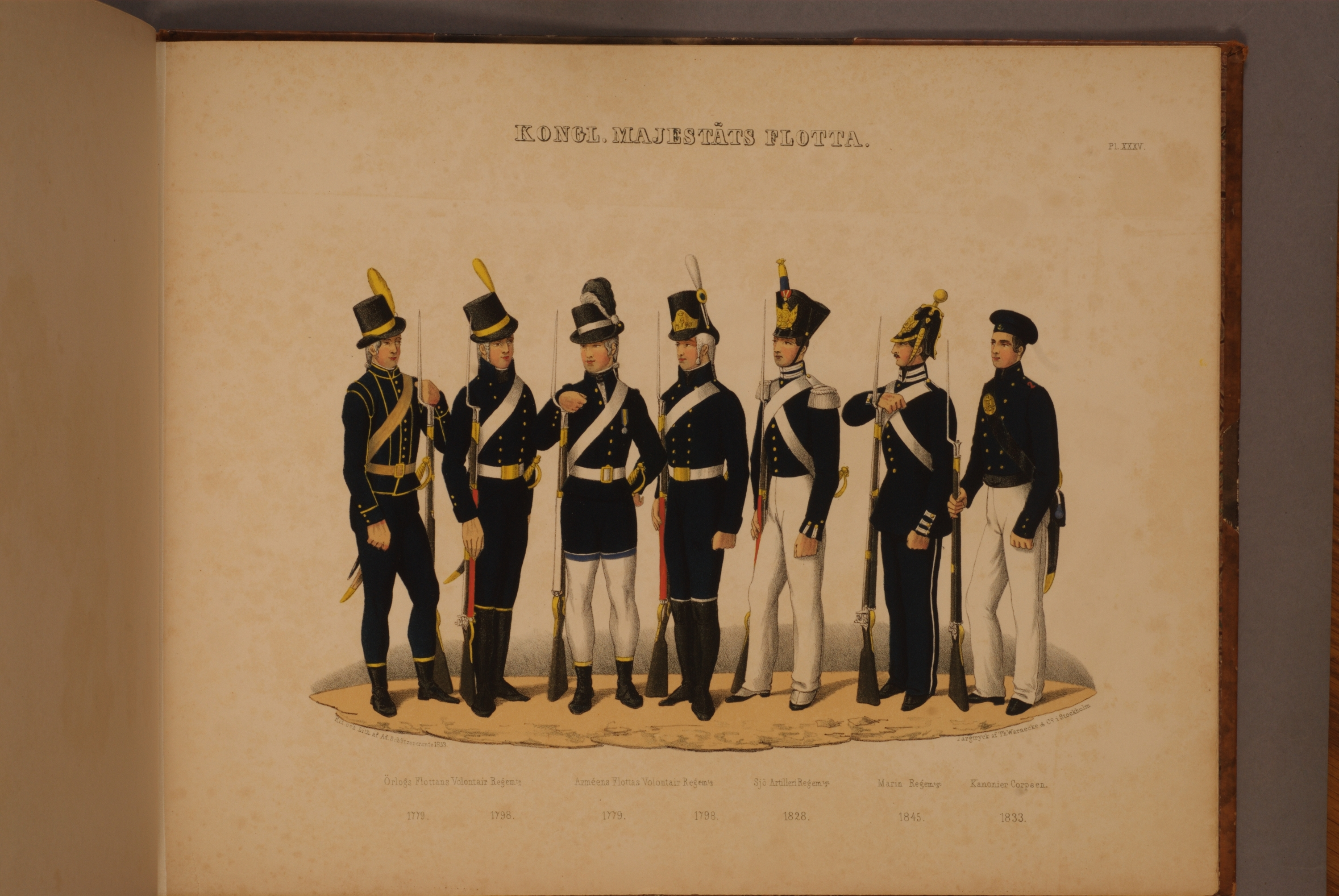
Swedish Navy uniforms from the period 1779–1833; lithography by Adolf Ulrik Schützercrantz

The Amphibious Corps dates back to 1 January 1902, when a separate "Coastal Artillery" (Kustartilleriet) was established, and Marinen came into use as the name of the service as a whole. The last decade of the 20th century saw the abandonment of the coastal fortifications and the force became a more regular marine corps, renamed Amphibious Corps (Amfibiekåren) in 2000.

For most of the twentieth century, the Swedish Navy focused on the threat of a full-scale invasion of Sweden via the Baltic Sea and on protecting commercial shipping. Sweden's location on the Scandinavian peninsula makes it highly dependent of maritime trade: 90% imports and exports enter or leave Sweden through the Baltic. In 1972, the government decreed that non-military measures should be used to protect merchant shipping. The resolution led to the decommissioning of all the navy's destroyers and frigates, though the non-military measures the government intended to use to protect shipping have never been specified.

The navy first participated in a UN-mandate international operation in Kosovo through KFOR, KS04 in 2001 by the amphibious corps. The fleet participated in its first UN operation UN-led peacekeeping mission in October 2006 when the corvette HSwMS Gävle (Note: In Swedish, vessels of the Swedish Navy are given the prefix "HMS", short for Hans/Hennes majestäts skepp (His/Her Majesty's Ship). In English, this is often changed to "HSwMS" ("His/Her Swedish Majesty's Ship") to differentiate Swedish vessels from those of the British Royal Navy.) began performing coastal surveillance duties for the United Nations Mission in Lebanon. HSwMS Gävle was relieved by HSwMS Sundsvall, which returned to Sweden in September 2007.

HSwMS Malmö, HSwMS Stockholm, and HSwMS Trossö took part in the EU-led EUNAVFOR operation (2008– ) off the coast of the Horn of Africa. In 2010, HSwMS Carlskrona was the EUNAVFOR flagship, housing the fleet headquarters led by RAdm (LH) Jan Thörnqvist.

=== Ensign and Jack ===
Naval ensign and jack since 1905

Naval ensign 1844–1905

Naval jack 1844-1905

Naval ensign 1815–1844

== Organization ==
Until recently, the Navy was led by the Chief of the Navy, who was typically a vice admiral. This office has been eliminated, and the highest officer of the Navy is now the Chief of Navy, Rear Admiral Johan Norlén, who is the senior representative of the Swedish Navy's combat forces.

The Marine units use the same system of rank as the Army.

=== Naval units ===
- 1st Submarine Flotilla (1. ubflj) located in Karlskrona
- 3rd Naval Warfare Flotilla (3. sjöstridsflj) located in Karlskrona
- 4th Naval Warfare Flotilla (4. sjöstridsflj) located at Berga

=== Amphibious units ===
- 1st Marine Regiment (Amf 1) located in Berga
- 4th Marine Regiment (Amf 4) located in Gothenburg

=== Bases ===
- Muskö Naval Base, located at Muskö island in the Stockholm archipelago. The base serves as the headquarters of the Swedish Navy since September 2019.
- Karlskrona Naval Base (MarinB), located at Karlskrona with detachments at Berga, Gothenburg and Skredsvik.

=== Training units ===
- Swedish Naval Warfare Centre (SSS) located in Karlskrona

== Equipment ==
The equipment of the Swedish Navy can be found on the following pages:

- Active equipment / fleet and future equipment:
  - List of active Swedish Navy ships
  - List of equipment of the Swedish Navy
- Former equipment / fleet:
  - List of historic ships of the Swedish Navy
  - List of coastal defence ships of the Swedish Navy

== Ranks ==
Commissioned officer ranks

The rank insignia of commissioned officers.

NATO code	OF-10	OF-9	OF-8	OF-7	OF-6	OF-5	OF-4	OF-3	OF-2	OF-1
Swedish Navy
Swedish Navy		Amiral	Viceamiral	Konteramiral	Flottiljamiral	Kommendör	Kommendörkapten	Örlogskapten	Kapten	Löjtnant	Fänrik

Other ranks

The rank insignia of non-commissioned officers and enlisted personnel.

NATO code	OR-9	OR-8	OR-7		OR-6		OR-5		OR-4	OR-3	OR-2				OR-1
Swedish Navy
Swedish Navy	Flottiljförvaltare	Förvaltare	Överfanjunkare	Fanjunkare	Översergeant	Sergeant	Överfurir	Furir	Korpral	Vicekorpral	Menig 4	Menig 3	Menig 2	Menig 1	Menig

== See also ==
- Royal Swedish Society of Naval Sciences
- Leidang
- List of Swedish wars
- List of admirals of Sweden
