= 31st Corvette Division =

Active Swedish Navy formation

Coordinates: 56°09′15″N 15°35′11″E

- 31. korvettdivisionen
- Active: 1993–1997; 2002–present
- Country: Sweden
- Branch: Swedish Navy
- Part of: 3rd Naval Warfare Flotilla
- Headquarters: Karlskrona Garrison

Commanders
- Commander: Cdr John Theander

The 31st Corvette Division (Note: Swedish: 31. korvettdivisionen, pronounced [ˈtrɛtːɪuˌfœʂːta kɔrˈvɛtː dɪviˈsjuːnən]) is a Swedish Navy corvette division based in Blekinge County. It has been active since 2002 and was formerly active between 1993 and 1997. The division is headquartered at Karlskrona Garrison.

== History ==
The division was first established in 1993 as the 42nd Corvette Division consisting only of Malmö and Stockholm. In 1995, it was renamed to the 31st Corvette Division but was disbanded two years later. In 2002, the division was re-established under the same name.

In 2019, a number of issues within the division were reported. The division faced a shortage of personnel, and there was a pressing need for both additional and modernised vessels, as the division's five ships were gradually assigned increasing responsibilities without a corresponding enhancement in operational capabilities.

Although upgrades to the Visby-class corvettes used by the division were initially planned, the programme was later dropped in favour of constructing four new corvettes of the Luleå-class. In 2025, following increased funding related to Sweden’s accession to NATO, the plan to upgrade the Visby-class corvettes was again approved.

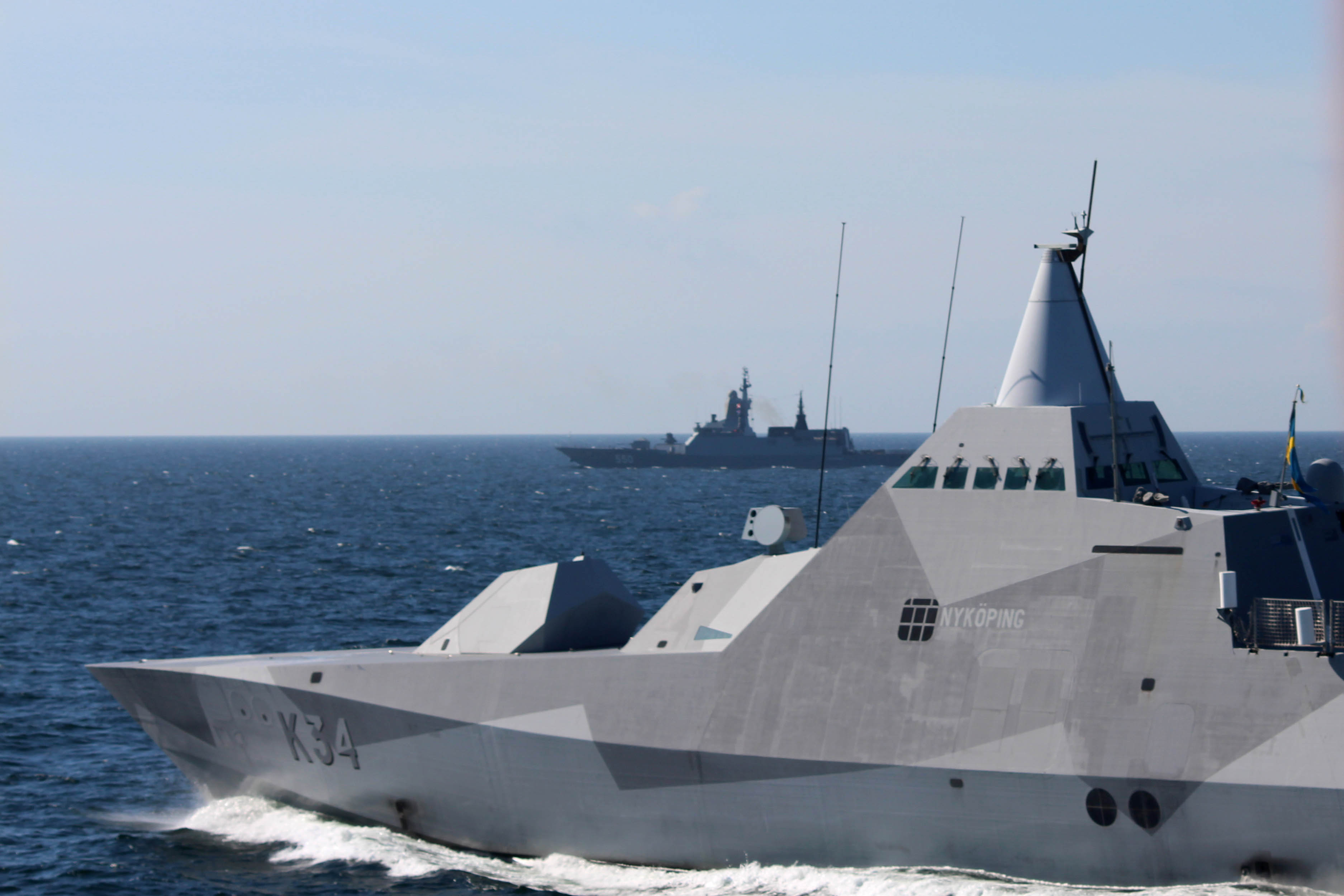
HSwMS Nyköping (K34), assigned to the 31st Corvette Division

=== Organisation ===
As of 2024, the peacetime organisation of the 31st Corvette Division is as follows:

- 31st Corvette Division
  - 311th Missile Unit
  - HSwMS Stockholm (P11)
  - HSwMS Malmö (P12)
  - HSwMS Härnösand (K33)
  - HSwMS Nyköping (K34)
  - HSwMS Karlstad (K35)

The division is unique within the Swedish Navy in that it includes the only missile unit of its kind: the 311th Missile Unit, which operates highly mobile anti-ship missile systems primarily intended to support naval forces in engagements with other vessels.

== Commanders ==
- 2016–2017: Cdr Johan Norlén
- 2020–present: Cdr John Theander

== Attributes ==
Attributes and locations of the 31st Corvette Division
Name	Translation	From	To
42. korvettdivisionen	42nd Corvette Division	1 January 1993	31 December 1994
31. korvettdivisionen	31st Corvette Division	1 January 1995	31 December 1997
31. korvettdivisionen	31st Corvette Division	1 January 2002	–
Designation		From	To
42. kvdiv		1 January 1993	31 December 1994
31. kvdiv		1 January 1995	31 December 1997
31. kvdiv		1 January 2002	–
Location		From	To
Karlskrona Naval Base		1 January 1993	31 December 1997
Karlskrona Naval Base		1 January 2002	–

== Sources ==
- Edwardson, Rolf (2010). "4. ytattackflottiljen och 3. ytstridsflottiljen i Karlskrona 1983–2003". hmsvastervik.se (in Swedish). Archived from the original on 5 December 2023.
- Högkvarteret (3 February 2022). "Tung kustrobot var på plats vid den skånska kusten". forsvarsmakten.se (in Swedish).
- Owetz, Josefine (19 March 2019). "Det mulnar vid horisonten". officerstidningen.se (in Swedish).
- Westberg, Melina (21 June 2023). "Det ska marinens nya fartyg heta". forsvarsmakten.se (in Swedish).
- Försvarsmakten (4 March 2024). "Tredje sjöstridsflottiljen". forsvarsmakten.se (in Swedish).
- FMV (28 May 2025). "FMV tecknar kontrakt för att bestycka Visbykorvetter med luftvärnsrobotar". fmv.se (in Swedish).
