= Johan Norlén =

Swedish Navy officer

- Born: 22 January 1971 (age 55)
- Military career
- Allegiance: Sweden
- Branch: Swedish Navy
- Service years: 1994–present
- Rank: Rear Admiral
- Commands: HSwMS Härnösand (K33); 31st Corvette Division; Chief of Navy

Rear Admiral Johan Norlén (born 22 January 1971) is a Swedish Navy officer. He currently serves as Chief of Navy. Norlén became a naval officer in 1994 and has held various roles aboard surface combat ships and within military staffs. He pursued advanced studies in France and Sweden, including at the École de Guerre and the Swedish Defence University. Promoted to captain in 2020 and rear admiral (lower half) in 2023, he served in key leadership positions, including commanding the 31st Corvette Division and later acting as a military adviser at the Ministry for Foreign Affairs. On 14 November 2024, he became Chief of Navy, succeeding Rear Admiral Ewa Skoog Haslum.

== Early life ==
Norlén graduated from Lerums gymnasium in Lerum in 1990.

== Career ==
Norlén became a naval officer in 1994 and served in various roles aboard surface combat ships and within different staffs. He attended the École militaire and the Ecole de Guerre in France. From 2006 to 2008, he studied at the Swedish Defence University, earning a bachelor's degree, and later attended the Collège interarmées de Défense in Paris from 2009 to 2010.

In March 2016, he assumed command of the 31st Corvette Division in Karlskrona, a position he held until September 2017. During this time, from October 2014 to August 2016, he also served as commanding officer of the corvette HSwMS Härnösand (K33).

From October 2017 to December 2019, Norlén served as Chief of the Planning Section in the Naval Staff. On 1 January 2020, he was promoted to captain and assigned to the Materiel and Logistics Division, Defense Logistics Office (Material- och logistikdivisionen, Försvarslogistikdetaljen) within the Defence Staff's Plans and Finance Department (LEDS PLANEK) at the Swedish Armed Forces Headquarters in Stockholm. On 1 December 2021, he was appointed Head of P/G within the same department.

In September 2022, Norlén attended the Institut des hautes études de défense nationale and the Centre des hautes études militaires in Paris, completing his studies there between 2022 and 2023.

He was promoted to rear admiral (lower half) on 15 October 2023, and the following day was seconded to the Ministry for Foreign Affairs as a military adviser. On 14 November 2024, Norlén succeeded Rear Admiral Ewa Skoog Haslum as Chief of Navy. The handover ceremony took place at Berga Naval Base, during which he was promoted to rear admiral.

== Dates of rank ==
- 1994 – Acting sub-lieutenant
- ?– Sub-lieutenant
- ? – Lieutenant
- ? – Lieutenant commander
- ? – Commander
- 1 January 2020 – Captain
- 15 October 2023 – Rear admiral (lower half)
- 14 November 2024 – Rear admiral

== Awards and decorations ==
- (Sweden) King Carl XVI Gustaf's Jubilee Commemorative Medal II (23 August 2013)
- (Sweden) H. M. The King's Medal, 8th size gold (silver-gilt) medal worn on the chest suspended by the Order of the Seraphim ribbon (2022)
- (Sweden) For Zealous and Devoted Service of the Realm
- (Sweden) Swedish Armed Forces Conscript Medal
- (Sweden) Swedish Armed Forces International Service Medal
- (Denmark) Commander of the Order of the Dannebrog
- (France) Commander of the Legion of Honour
- United Nations Medal (MINUSMA)

== Honours ==
- Member of the Royal Swedish Society of Naval Sciences (2023)
- Member of the Royal Swedish Academy of War Sciences, Department II (22 May 2024)

Military offices
Preceded by Ewa Skoog Haslum	Chief of Navy; 2024–present	Succeeded by Incumbent
