= HSwMS Härnösand =

Several ships of the Swedish Navy have been named HSwMS Härnösand, named after the city of Härnösand:

- Härnösands vapen (1743) was a frigate launched in 1743
- HSwMS Härnösand (K33) was a Visby-class corvette launched in 2004
