= HSwMS Smyge =

Swedish navy stealth technology research vessel

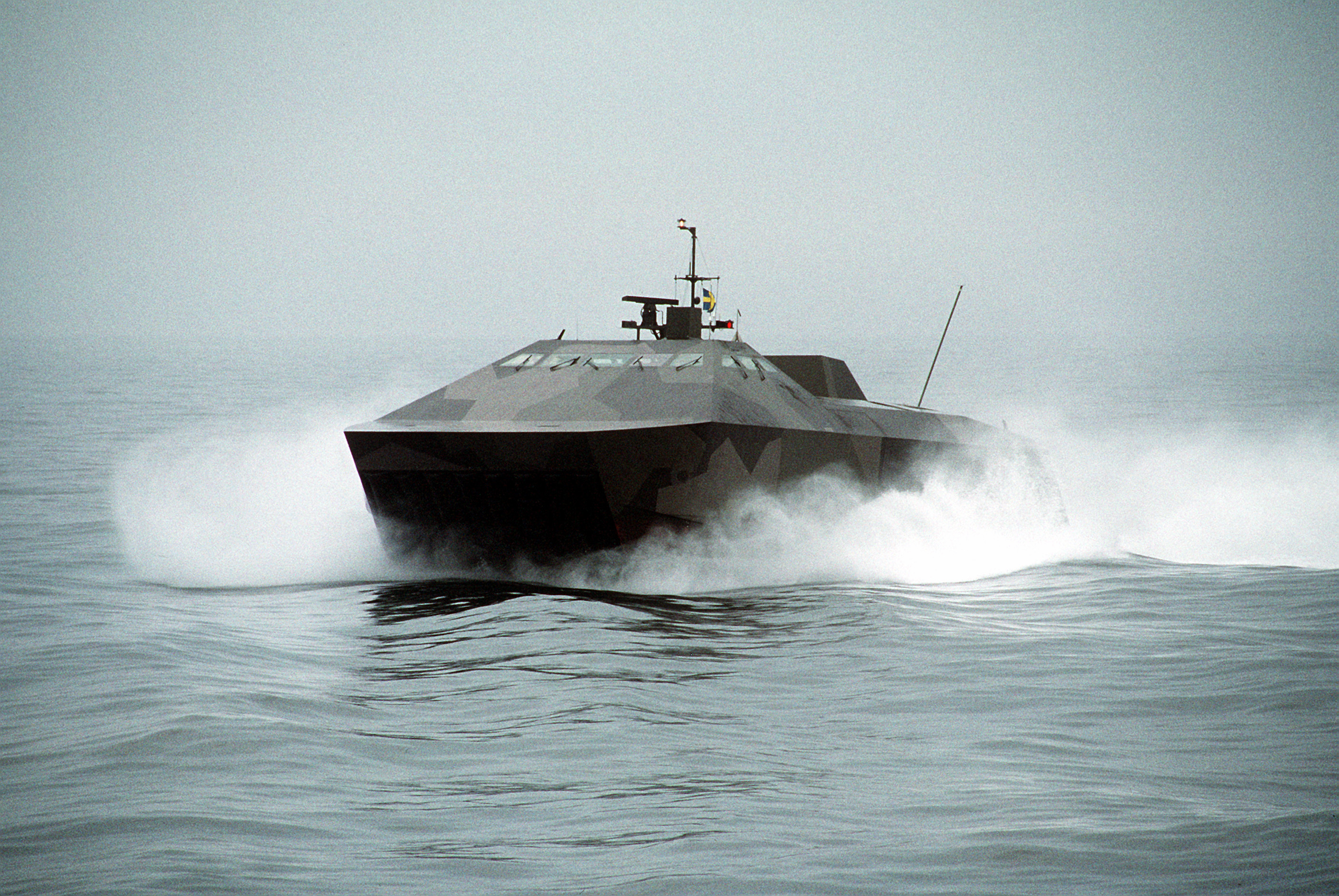
- HMS Smyge

Class overview
- Name: Smyge
- Builders: Karlskronavarvet, Insano
- Operators: Swedish Navy
- Built: 1991
- Completed: 1

General characteristics
- Type: Experimental stealth vessel
- Displacement: 140 tons
- Length: 27 m (89 ft)
- Beam: 7.6 m (25 ft)
- Draught: 1.8 m (5 ft 11 in) (0.7 m (2 ft 4 in) with lift fans)
- Speed: >55 kn (102 km/h)
- Electronic warfare & decoys: Decoy:
- Armament: 1 × Bofors 40 mm; 2 × RBS-15Anti Ship Missiles; 2 × 400 mm Lightweight Saab Type 45 Torpedo

HSwMS Smyge was an experimental ship of the Swedish Navy used to test stealth technology launched in 1991. Experience from Smyge was used while planning the Visby-class corvettes. As of 2014, Smyge is used for training at the Swedish Naval Warfare Centre.

HMS Smyge emblem.
