= Swedish Armed Forces Diving and Naval Medicine Centre =

Diver education and training; diving medicine research and development

- Försvarsmaktens dykeri och navalmedicinska centrum
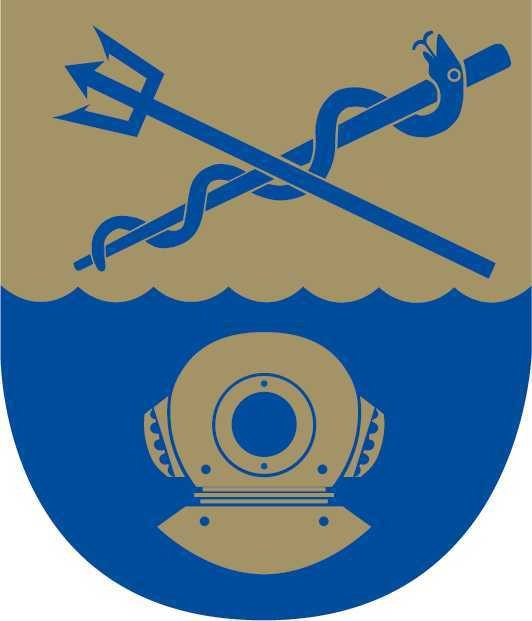
- Active: 1979–present
- Country: Sweden
- Allegiance: Swedish Armed Forces
- Branch: Swedish Navy
- Type: Centre
- Role: Diver training, research, development, testing
- Garrison/HQ: Karlskrona

Commanders
- Current commander: Ulf Sjöwall

Swedish Armed Forces Diving and Naval Medicine Centre (Swedish: Försvarsmaktens dykeri och navalmedicinska centrum, FM DNC) is a centre which is responsible for education and training of divers for the Swedish Armed Forces. The centre is also responsible for research and development and conduct tests for diving medicine, and tests of underwater equipment. The unit is a part of the Swedish Naval Warfare Centre and is based in Karlskrona.

== History ==
The unit was raised on 1 July 1979 as the Swedish Navy Diving Center (Marinens dykericentrum) and was then a part of the Berga Naval Training Schools. Between 1 July 1985 and 30 June 1994, the unit was part of Dykdivisionen ("Diving Division") of the 1st Submarine Flotilla, and from 1 July 1994 it constituted a section within the Swedish Naval Tactical Center. On 1 July 2000, the centre became an independent centre under the name of the Swedish Armed Forces Diving and Naval Medicine Centre. Prior to the Defence Act of 2004, the Swedish government considered that the Swedish Armed Forces education system was both irrational and cost-driven, since training in technical service was carried out at the Försvarsmaktens Halmstadsskolor (FMHS) in Halmstad, the Swedish Army Technical School (Arméns tekniska skola, ATS) in Östersund and at the Swedish Naval Training Schools (Örlogsskolorna, ÖS) in Karlskrona and Haninge/Berga. In addition, the Swedish Armed Forces trained conscripts in technical service at the educational platforms, as well as at the Uppland Regiment (S 1) and at the Flygvapnets Uppsalaskolor (F 20). In its place, the government considered that all technical education, which also included the technical education at the Swedish Naval Training Schools, would be gathered to a new school, the Swedish Armed Forces Technical School (Försvarsmaktens tekniska skola, FMTS), located to Halmstad Garrison. Furthermore, in its act, the government considered the two naval bases, the East Coast Naval Base and the South Coast Naval Base, would be replaced by one naval base, the Naval Base, located in Karlskrona. This meant that the focus of the Swedish Navy's operations was moved entirely to Karlskrona. Thus, the remaining education at the Swedish Naval Training Schools together with the Swedish Armed Forces Diving and Naval Medicine Centre in Berga would be moved to Karlskrona. Furthermore, the government proposed that the Swedish Amphibious Combat School (Amfibiestridsskolan, AmfSS) would be disbanded, and the amphibious training would be moved to Karlskrona. Furthermore, a marine combat school, the Swedish Naval Warfare Centre, would be formed in Karlskrona to thereby obtain coordination gains linked to the Naval Base. On 31 December 2004, the Swedish Naval Training Schools were disbanded, and from 1 January 2005, the school was transferred to a decommissioning organization until the decommissioning was completed by 30 June 2006. On 1 January 2005, the Swedish Naval Warfare Centre in Karlskrona was raised. The Swedish Naval Warfare Centre became the centre for the naval training, but not the technical training, and since 1 January 2005, the Swedish Armed Forces Diving and Naval Medicine Centre has been operating as a centre of expertise.

== Structure ==
The Swedish Armed Forces Diving and Naval Medicine Centre is responsible for the development and training of divers for the Swedish Armed Forces diving operations. The centre provides diver training, equipment development and management/correction of equipment defects. The centre has also delegated responsibility for diving medicine. It is located in Karlskrona. The centre has three sections with an overall manager and three support staff covering:

- Research and Development Section
- Diving Medicine Section
- Diving School

=== Research and Development Section ===
The Research and Development Section is cooperating with the Swedish Armed Forces units, the Royal Institute of Technology (KTH), the Blekinge Institute of Technology and the Defence Materiel Administration to ensure that the operational units receive safe and appropriate equipment. The centre investigates military and civilian diving accidents and monitors in service diving equipment from delivery to disposal. The centres resources are available to other government authorities, and in special circumstances.

=== Diving School ===
The Diving School trains divers, diving supervisors and diving chamber operators. In addition, the Swedish Armed Forces units are trained in the use of emergency air-supply equipment. The course participants are mainly from the Swedish Armed Forces but personnel from the Swedish Coast Guard, the Rescue Services Agency and civilian organisations also participate. Divers and submarine crews undergo training in the 21 meters deep, submarine escape training facility. The facility was originally built in 1944 and is located within the Naval Base in Karlskrona. In addition to the above, the centre trains and validates civilian divers for professional diving certificates to the levels shown below.

==== Diving School training and validation levels ====
- S 30, SCUBA diving to a depth of 30 meters
- A 40, SCUBA diving to a depth of 40 meters
- H 30, Hard hat diving to a depth of 30 meters
- B 50, Hard hat diving to depths greater than 30 meters
- IDSA Level 1-3
- Diving Supervisor certificate for all of the above

=== Diving Medicine Section ===
The Diving Medicine Section is responsible for diving related issues within the Swedish Armed Forces and works with diving from a medical perspective through courses, research, accident investigations and trials of new equipment. The Swedish Armed Forces Diving and Naval Medicine Centre runs a diving chamber for emergency use. Diving physicians are trained in cooperation with Sahlgrenska University Hospital in Gothenburg and the Royal Institute of Technology. The training is in accordance with the standards of the European Diving Technology Committee (EDTC) and the European Committee for Hyperbaric Medicine (ECHM).

== Diving equipment ==
The following diving equipment is used:

- SCUBA with optional surface supported SCUBA
- Surface supported demand or free-flow Diving Helmets (Hard Hat)
- Semi-closed circuit rebreathers
- Oxygen rebreathers

Future diving capabilities will include closed circuit rebreather, additional breathing gases and increased depths.

== Capabilities ==
Capabilities of the FM DNC:

- Manned diving to a depth of 160 meters in a dry/wet diving chamber with additional environmental control to simulate arctic to tropical climates
- Unmanned testing to a depth of 200 meters in the ANSTI Life Support Test Facility with programmable breathing simulator and environmental control from 0º C to + 40º C
- Environmental Test Cabinet for air tests from -70 - +180º C. and humidity 10 - 98% RH
- Flume pool with water flow simulating currents up to 4 knots and a temperature of +2 - + 40º C, indoor training pool with a depth of 6 meters and outdoor pools 2.5 meter
- Accredited test laboratory according to ISO/IEC 17025

== Medical courses ==
The following medical courses are held at the FM DNC:

- Basic diving medicine training and hyperbaric oxygen therapy for physicians and specialist nurses
- Applied training in diving medicine for medical personnel and diving supervisors
- Introductory dive training for diving physicians

== Heraldry and traditions ==
=== Coat of arms ===
The coat of arms of the Swedish Armed Forces Diving and Naval Medicine Centre was previously used by the Swedish Navy Diving Center. Blazon: "Or, an engrailed line – wherein a trident and a rod of Asclepius bendwise sinister, all azure – and azure, wherein a diving helmet, or".

== Names, designations and locations ==
Name	Translation	From		To
Marinens dykericentrum	Swedish Navy Diving Center	1979-07-01	–	2000-06-30
Försvarsmaktens dykeri och navalmedicinska centrum	Swedish Armed Forces Diving and Naval Medicine Centre	2000-07-01	–	
Designation		From		To
MDC		1979-07-01	–	2000-06-30
FM DNC		2000-07-01	–	
Location		From		To
Haninge Garrison		1979-07-01	–	2005-08-31
Karlskrona Garrison		2005-09-01	–	

== See also ==
- Swedish Naval Warfare Centre
