= K31 (disambiguation) =

K31 is a Swiss rifle.

K31 may also refer to:

- K-31 (Kansas highway)
- HMS Camellia (K31), a corvette of the Royal Navy
- HSwMS Visby (K31), a corvette of the Swedish Navy
- Potassium-31, an isotope of potassium
- Soviet submarine K-31
- Sonata in B-flat, K. 31, by Wolfgang Amadeus Mozart
