= Ewa Skoog Haslum =

Swedish Navy officer

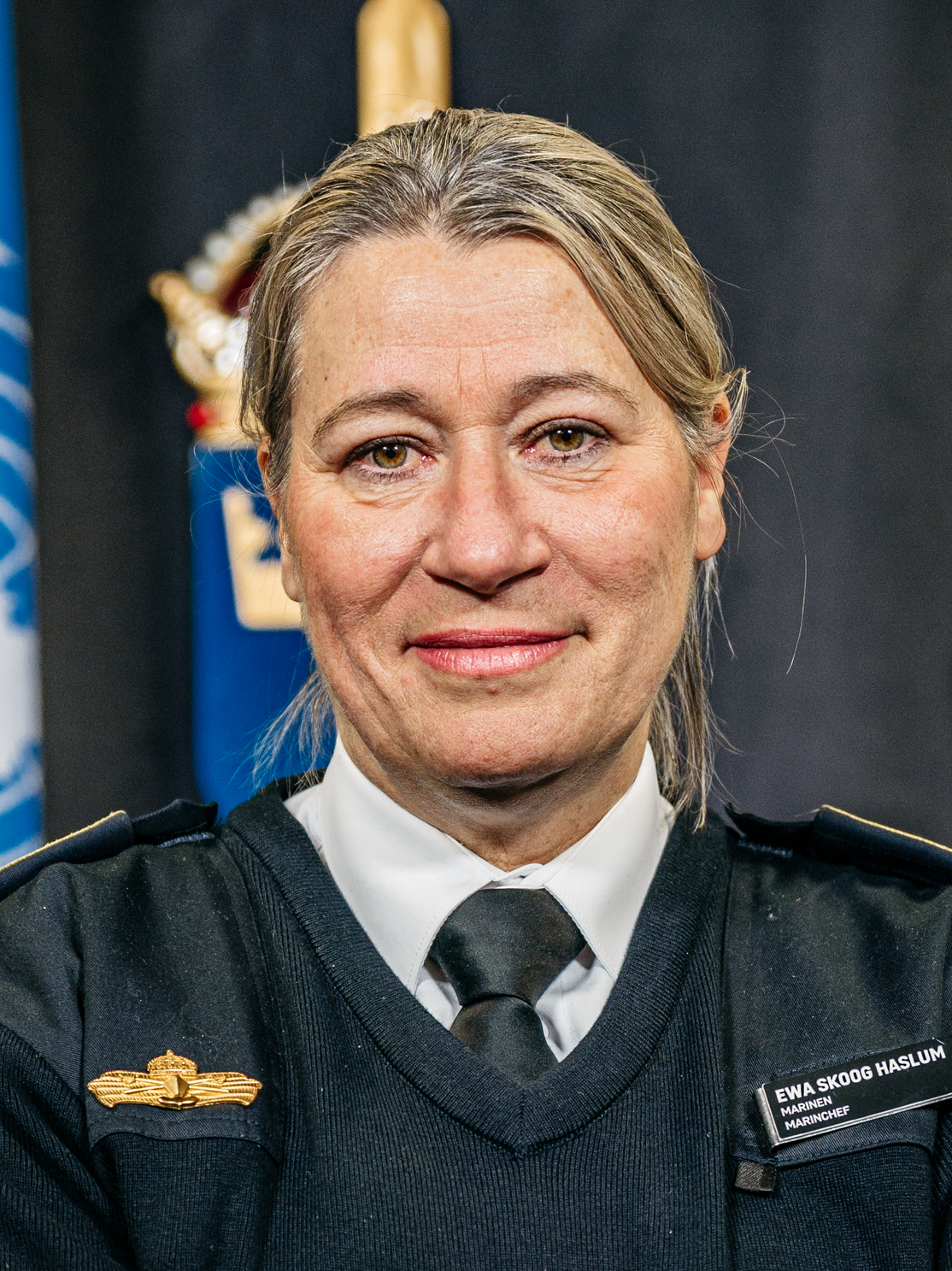
- Born: Ewa Ann-Sofi Skoog; 26 March 1968 (age 58); Hov, Kristianstad County, Sweden
- Military career
- Allegiance: Sweden
- Branch: Swedish Navy
- Service years: 1990–present
- Rank: Vice Admiral
- Commands: HSwMS Sundsvall; 4th Naval Warfare Flotilla; Deputy Vice Chancellor, Swedish Defence University; Chief of Navy; Chief of Joint Operations
- Conflicts: 2006 Lebanon War

Vice Admiral Ewa Ann-Sofi Skoog Haslum née Skoog (born 26 March 1968) is a senior Swedish Navy officer. She currently serves as the Chief of Joint Operations since 15 November 2024. Skoog Haslum began her naval career in 1990 as an acting sub-lieutenant in Sweden's 2nd Surface Warfare Flotilla and was promoted to lieutenant in 1993. She served on HSwMS Gävle as an artillery officer and later taught at the Tactical Command School. Her first non-naval role was in the Future Planning Department at the Swedish Armed Forces Headquarters from 2001 to 2003. She commanded the corvette HSwMS Sundsvall from 2006 to 2008, including a UN mission off Lebanon's coast to prevent arms smuggling. From 2010 to 2017, she also served as Aide-de-camp to Crown Princess Victoria. After leading the 4th Naval Warfare Flotilla and becoming Deputy Vice Chancellor of the Swedish Defence University in 2016, she was promoted to rear admiral. Skoog Haslum became Chief of Navy in 2020 and assumed the role of Chief of Joint Operations in November 2024, along with a promotion to vice admiral.

== Early life ==
Skoog was born on 26 March 1968 in Hov Parish, Kristianstad County, Sweden, and she grew up in Torekov. She attended the technical program in secondary school. Skoog Haslum began her military career in 1987 as a conscript enlisted radio telegraphist on board HSwMS Stockholm.

== Career ==
She was commissioned as a naval officer in the 2nd Surface Warfare Flotilla (Andra ytstridsflottiljen) in 1990 with the rank of acting sub-lieutenant (fänrik). She was promoted to lieutenant there in 1993. From 1994 to 1995, she served as an artillery officer/observer on HSwMS Gävle (K22). At this time, she also served as a steering officer and "kept watch together with Anders Olovsson, her future Deputy Chief of Navy. Skoog Haslum was promoted to lieutenant in 1995. From 1997 to 1998, she served as a teacher at the Tactical Command School (Ledningsstridsskolan) at Berga Naval Base.

Skoog Haslum's first position outside the navy was from 2001 to 2003 when she served in the Future Planning Department (Perspektivplaneringen, PerP) at the Swedish Armed Forces Headquarters in Stockholm. She served as captain of the corvette HSwMS Sundsvall from 2006 to 2008. For almost 6 months in 2007, she captained HSwMS Sundsvall in the UNIFIL Maritime Task Force (MTF) and patrolled the coast of Lebanon, to stop gun smugglers and terrorists, and to ensure aid deliveries reach Beirut, and not be cut off by pirates. From 2008 to 2010, she attended the Management Program of the Swedish National Defence College and from 2010 to 2011 she was assigned to the Maritime Component Command at the Swedish Armed Forces Headquarters. From 2010 to 2017, Skoog Haslum served one month a year as Aide-de-camp to Victoria, Crown Princess of Sweden.

She was commanding officer of the 4th Naval Warfare Flotilla from 2014 to 2016 and she was then employed by the Swedish Defence University from 1 December 2016 and became the new Deputy Vice Chancellor of the university in early 2017. She then came together with the Vice Chancellor to lead the Swedish Defence University's development of education, not least with regard to future officer training. The Deputy Vice Chancellor is the Swedish Defence University's highest military representative and advises the Vice Chancellor. The Deputy Vice Chancellor has an important role in the development of the university and is also responsible for collaboration with foreign defense colleges and other international partners in the military field. The Deputy Vice Chancellor also acts as exercise leader in major exercises. In conjunction with the appointment, Skoog Haslum was promoted to rear admiral (lower half).

On 11 December 2019, Skoog Haslum was appointed Chief of Navy and she took office on 21 January 2020. She was at the same time promoted to rear admiral.

On 24 October 2024 the Swedish government announced that Haslum would succeed Lieutenant General Carl-Johan Edström as Chief of Joint Operations on 15 November, and would be promoted to the rank of vice admiral.

== Personal life ==
Skoog is married to Stefan Haslum and they have two sons.

== Dates of rank ==
- 1990 – Acting sub-lieutenant
- 1993 – Sub-lieutenant
- 1995 – Lieutenant
- 2001 – Lieutenant commander
- 2010 – Commander
- 2014 – Captain
- 2016 – Rear admiral (lower half)
- 2020 – Rear admiral
- 15 November 2024 – Vice admiral

== Awards and decorations ==
=== Swedish ===
- (Sweden) For Zealous and Devoted Service of the Realm
- (Sweden) King Carl XVI Gustaf's Jubilee Commemorative Medal II (23 August 2013)
- (Sweden) H. M. The King's Medal, 8th size gold (silver-gilt) medal worn on the chest suspended by the Order of the Seraphim ribbon (28 January 2015)
- (Sweden) Crown Princess Victoria and Prince Daniel's Wedding Commemorative Medal (8 June 2010)
- (Sweden) Swedish Armed Forces Conscript Medal
- (Sweden) Swedish Armed Forces International Service Medal
- (Sweden) 2nd Surface Warfare Flotilla Commemorative Medal (2. ytstridsflottiljens minnesmedalj, 2ysfljMSM)

=== Foreign ===
- (France) Commander of the Ordre national du Mérite (1 September 2022)
- (Germany) Gold Cross of Honour of the Bundeswehr (21 October 2024)
- United Nations Medal (UNIFIL)

== Honours ==
- Member of the Royal Swedish Academy of War Sciences (2018)

Military offices
| Preceded by Jonas Wikström | 4th Naval Warfare Flotilla; 2014–2016 | Succeeded by Fredrik Palmquist |
| Preceded by Bengt Axelsson | Deputy Vice Chancellor of the Swedish Defence University; 2017–2020 | Succeeded by Fredrik Ståhlberg |
| Preceded by Jens Nykvist | Chief of Navy; 2020–2024 | Succeeded by Johan Norlén |
| Preceded by Carl-Johan Edström | Chief of Joint Operations; 2024–present | Succeeded by Incumbent |
