= HSwMS Helsingborg (K32) =

Swedish Visby-class corvette

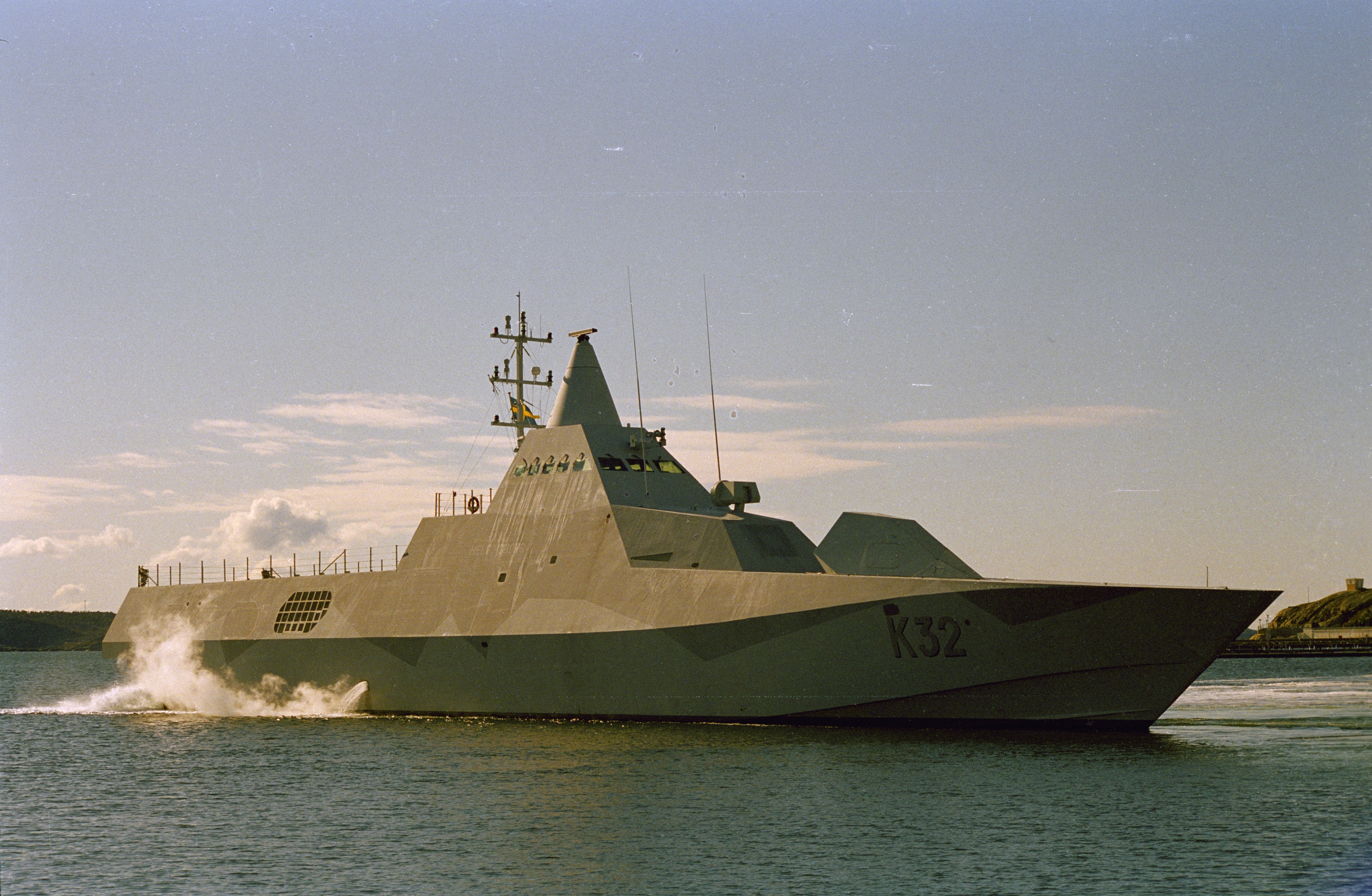

History
- Name: Helsingborg
- Namesake: Helsingborg
- Ordered: 1990
- Builder: Kockums
- Launched: 27 June 2003
- Commissioned: 16 December 2009
- Home port: Berga
- Identification: MMSI number: 265897000; Pennant number: K32; Callsign: SMLG
- Status: Active
- Badge

General characteristics
- Class & type: Visby-class corvette
- Displacement: 660 t (650 long tons)
- Length: 72.6 m (238 ft 2 in)
- Beam: 10.4 m (34 ft 1 in)
- Draft: 2.5 m (8 ft 2 in)
- Propulsion: CODAG; 2 ×KaMeWa Waterjets; 4 × Honeywell TF 50 A gas turbines, total rating 16 MW; 2 × MTU Friedrichshafen 16V 2000 N90 diesel engines, total rating 2.6 MW
- Speed: 35+ knots
- Complement: 27 officers; 16 conscripts
- Sensors & processing systems: Ericsson Sea Giraffe ABM 3D surveillance radar; Ceros 200 Fire control radar system; Condor CS-3701 Tactical Radar Surveillance System; Hull-mounted sonar; Towed array sonar system; Variable depth sonar
- Electronic warfare & decoys: Rheinmetall Waffe Munition MASS (Multi-Ammunition Softkill) decoy system
- Armament: 1 × Bofors 57 mm gun Mk 3; 8 × RBS15 Mk2 AShM; 4 × 40cm Torped 45; ASW grenade launchers; Mines & depth charges
- Aviation facilities: Helipad

HSwMS Helsingborg (K32) is a Swedish Visby-class corvette. She was ordered by the Swedish Government in 1995 and is the second ship of the class built by Kockums. She has been in active service with the 31st Corvette Squadron, 3rd Naval Warfare Flotilla since 19 December 2009. It is a stealth missile corvette.

== Design and description ==
HSwMS Helsingborg is the second ship of the Visby-class corvettes. It was built by Kockums at the Karlskrona naval base, and was the first of four vessels of the class which are designed for coastal warfare.

The hull of the vessel is made of carbon fiber reinforced plastic, a stealth technology, in order to make the vessel difficult to detect by other forces. A minimum of external equipment is stored outside of the vessel, with equipment such as liferafts being stored inside the hull. This hull also reduces the weight of the vessel by around half. It was intended to be radar silent until it moves within 30 kilometres (19 mi) of an enemy vessel, resulting in designer John Nillson saying of it, "Naval officers fall in love with [this] ship. It's not classically beautiful. In fact it looks like a lunchbox. But it has better maneuverability and can achieve that level of stealth."

== Construction and career ==
Kockums delivered her to FMV on 24 April 2006, when she started her extensive operational sea trials, during which she has returned to the yard several times. On 12 August 2006 she left Sweden for the Mediterranean. She returned to Karlskrona 11 September the same year.
