= Berga Naval Training Schools =

- Berga örlogsskolor
- Active: 1946–1997
- Country: Sweden
- Allegiance: Swedish Armed Forces
- Branch: Swedish Navy
- Type: Swedish Fleet
- Role: School
- Part of: East Coast Naval Base (1966–1990); East Coast Naval Command (1990–1994); Middle Military District (1994–1997)
- Garrison/HQ: Berga
- March: "Vår flotta" (Widner) (Note: The march was adopted and established on 30 June 1994. The march was used in 2005–2006 by the Swedish Naval Warfare Centre.)

Insignia
- Flag

Berga Naval Training Schools (Swedish: Berga örlogsskolor, BÖS) was a military branch school for the Swedish Fleet within the Swedish Navy, which operated in various forms from 1946 to 1997. The staff was located at Berga Naval Base in Haninge Garrison in Berga, Haninge Municipality.

== History ==
After the industrialist Helge Axelsson Johnson died in 1941, the Berga estate was sold to the state for SEK 2,600,000 in 1944, and the navy then gained access to sought after land next to Hårsfjärden while the Swedish Forest Service (Domänverket) was taking over the agricultural land and Berga property. The area covered a beach strip stretching from Vitså harbor to Näringsberg and was 3.5 km long and 800 meters wide. In addition to the beach strip, a part of the area where the Berga Agricultural School was located was also added, with an area of 1,025 hectares. The purchase price for the acquisition of the property was SEK 2,635,000. The coastline was divided into a naval base and naval schools. The hunting ground was transformed into training area and firing range. The Berga Naval Training Schools started their operations in 1946, then as the Swedish Navy Non-Commissioned Officers’ School (Marinens underofficersskola, MUOS). Now the first wave of staff and families moved in. In Västerhaninge, a whole block was also built for the fleet's families.

The Berga Naval Training Schools' had the main task of training staff, both conscripts and professional officers, in seamanship and basic military training. At the schools there was also a certain vocational education. The Berga Naval Training Schools were formed by relocating the education at Skeppsholmen in Stockholm to Berga. On 1 July 1946, the operations at Berga Naval Training Schools began with training in the Non-commissioned School's chief mate and machinist programs (Underofficersskolans styrmans- och maskinistlinjer), while the craft, economy and coastal artillery programs began on 1 October. On 21 October 1946, the Crown Prince Gustaf Adolf initiated the opening of the Swedish Navy Non-Commissioned Officers’ School (Marinens underofficersskola, MUOS). In the summer of 1949, the construction of a facility for the exercise of the torpedo and submarine attack was started. From 1948 to 1949, submarine and anti-submarine warfare training began at Berga for both officers and conscripts. Parts of the training were transferred to the submarine training center Valrossen ("The Walrus"). In 1955, the Swedish Navy Non-Commissioned Officers’ School (Marinens underofficersskola, MUOS) was amalgamated into the Navy Schools at Berga (Marinens skolor på Berga) or Berga Schools (Bergaskolorna), a name that had existed since 1946 as a collective name of the schools at Berga. In 1960, the name of the school was changed to Berga Naval Training Schools.

Prior to the Defence Act of 1977, the Swedish Armed Forces Peace Organization Investigation (Försvarets fredsorganisationsutredning, FFU) considered that the naval training on land should be centralized and that Karlskrona Naval Training Schools (Karlskrona örlogsskolor, KÖS) and Berga Naval Training Schools should remain separate schools. This was something that was raised and also emphasized in the Government Bill 1978/79:96. There, the FFU considered that the navy's training organization was largely rational and felt that Karlskrona Naval Training Schools and Berga Naval Training Schools would remain as central educational institutions. In connection with the formation of the Swedish Armed Forces on 1 July 1994, the Berga Naval Training Schools changed name to the Berga Naval Training Schools, Swedish Armed Forces (Försvarsmakten Berga örlogsskolor, FM BÖS). Prior to stage two of the Defence Act of 1996, both the Swedish Armed Forces and the Swedish government proposed that Karlskrona Naval Training Schools be disbanded, and that its operations should be amalgamated into in the Berga Naval Training Schools. However, the new school would continue to operate in Karlskrona. Thus, the Berga Naval Training Schools was also disbanded. On 1 July 1997, the new school, the Swedish Naval Training Schools (Örlogsskolorna, ÖS), was formed, with staff in Berga and training in both Berga and Karlskrona.

== Operations ==
The Berga Naval Training Schools operated between 21 October 1946 to 30 June 1994. Under the commanding officer of the Berga Naval Training Schools, there was a staff with a chief of staff (SC), Planning and Economics Department (PEA), Central Department (CentA), Education Department (UtbA), Personnel Department (PersA), Administration Department (ForVA), Health Care Department (SjvA), Cadet and Candidate School Company (Kaskomp - later called staff company). The Berga Naval Training Schools received production support in the form of administration of wages from the East Coast Naval Base until 30 June 1990. During 1 July 1990 and 30 June 1994, the East Coast Naval Command managed the same task.

The Berga Naval Training Schools, Swedish Armed Forces (Försvarsmakten Berga örlogsskolor, FM BÖS) was organized as follows: under the commanding officer of the Berga Naval Training Schools, Swedish Armed Forces, there was a staff consisting of a staff company (later name change to Depot Company), Sports and Health Care Unit (IdrE), Education Department (UtbA), Personnel Department (PersA), Planning and Economics Office (PeD), and schools. The Berga Naval Training Schools, Swedish Armed Forces provided production support for the Coastal Fleet's units from 1 November 1994 in the form of administration of wage payments.

== Units ==
In the years 1946-1997, the following schools have been included in the Berga Naval Training Schools.

- Navy Non-Commissioned Officers’ School (Marinens underofficersskola, MUOS) 1946–1972
- Weapons Officers’ School (Vapenofficersskola, VOS) 1950–1972, 1982–1987-06-30)
- Navy Company Officers’ School (Marinens kompaniofficersskola, MKS) 1972–1982
- Weapon Regimental Officers’ School (Vapenregementsofficersskola, VRS) 1972–1982
- Navy Staff College (Marinens krigshögskola, MKHS) 1987-07-01–1996-12-31
- Artillery and Torpedo School (Artilleri- och torpedskolan, ATskol) –1982-12-31
- Surface Attack School (Ytattackskolan, YAskol; 1983-01-01–1995-12-31
- Base and Recruit School (Bas- och rekrytskolan, BRskol) –1998-03-30
- Basic Training Battalion (Grundutbildningsbatljonen, GU-bat) 1988-04-01–1997-06-30
- Machine School (Maskinskolan, Maskol) –1982-12-31
- Ship Technical School (Skeppstekniska skolan, STskol) 1983-01-01–1993-06-30
- Mechanical and Electrical School (Maskin- och elektroskolan, MEskol) 1993-07-01–1997-06-30
- Radar and Signal School (Radar- och signalskolan, RSskol) –1982-12-31
- Telecommunications Combat School (Telestridsskolan, TSskol) 1983-01-01–1995-12-31
- Rescue Service School (Räddningstjänstskolan, RTskol) 1993-07-01–1997-06-30
- Combat Medical School (Stridssjukvårdsskolan, Sjvskol) –1982-12-31
- Safety Service School (Skyddstjänstskolan, Skyskol)–1982-12-31
- Submarine and ASW School (Ubåts- och ubåtsjaktskolan, Ubjskol/UJskol) –1982-12-31
- Underwater Combat School (Undervattenstridskolan, USskol) 1983-01-01–1995-12-31
- Navy Diving Center (Marinens dykericentrum, MDC) 1979-07-01–1985-06-30
- Command and Control System (Ledningssystemsskolan, LSskol) 1996-01-01–1997-06-30
- Submarine Combat School (Ubåtsstridsskolan, UBskol) 1996-01-01–1997-06-30
- Mine Warfare School (Minkrigsskolan, Mkriskol) 1996-01-01–1997-06-30
- Surface Combat School (Ytstridsskolan, YSskol) 1996-01-01–1997-06-30

== Heraldry and traditions ==
=== Flag ===
The flag of the Berga Naval Training Schools was a double swallow-tailed Swedish flag. The flag were presented to the Berga Naval Training Schools in 1996. It was later taken over by the Swedish Naval Training Schools (Örlogsskolorna, ÖS).

=== Coat of arms ===
The coat of arms of the Berga Naval Training Schools 1955–1997. Blazon: "Per bend sinister azure an anchor cabled and a torch in saltire and or a cock-capercaillie, all counterchanged".

=== March ===
The Berga Naval Training Schools was given the march "Älvsnabben" (Broberg) in 1966. The march was handed over by the then Crown Prince Carl Gustaf after a long distance journey with HSwMS Älvsnabben (M01) during the years 1965-1966. The march was established on 10 February 1976. On 30 June 1994, it was replaced by the march "Vår flotta" (Widner). The march was taken over by the Swedish Naval Training Schools (Örlogsskolorna, ÖS) in 1998, and was then used by the Swedish Naval Warfare Centre from 2005 to 2006.

== Commanding officers ==
- 1946–1949: Bror-Fredrik Thermänius
- 1949–1951: Kjell Hasselgren
- 1951–1956: Erik Friberg
- 1956–1958: Stig Bergelin
- 1959–1961: Sven Hermelin
- 1961–1966: Gustav Lindgren
- 1966–1968: Nils-Erik Ödman
- 1968–1971: Tryggve Norinder
- 1971–1973: Alf Berggren
- 1973–1978: Hans Petrelius
- 1978–1980: Göte Blom
- 1980–1983: Christer Söderhielm
- 1983–1987: Cay Holmberg
- 1987–1989: Tomas Lagerman
- 1989–1991: Ulf Samuelsson
- 1991–1993: Roderick Klintebo
- 1994–1996: Anders Stävberg
- 1996–1997: Göran Frisk

== Names, designations and locations ==
Name	Translation	From		To
Marinens underofficersskola	Swedish Navy Non-Commissioned Officers’ School	1946-07-01	–	1955-??-??
Marinens skolor på Berga (Bergaskolorna)	Navy Schools at Berga (Berga Schools)	1955-??-??	–	1960-??-??
Berga örlogsskolor	Berga Naval Training Schools [Swedish] Naval Training Establishment [Swedish] Naval Training Establishment, Berga; Berga Naval Schools	1960-??-??	–	1994-06-30
Försvarsmakten Berga örlogsskolor	Berga Naval Training Schools, Swedish Armed Forces	1994-07-01	–	1997-06-30
Designation		From		To
MUOS		1946-07-01	–	1955-??-??
Bskol		1955-??-??	–	1960-??-??
BÖS		1960-??-??	–	1994-06-30
FM BÖS		1994-07-01	–	1997-06-30
Location		From		To
Berga Naval Base		1946-07-01	–	1997-06-30
