= Jonas Wikström =

Swedish Navy officer

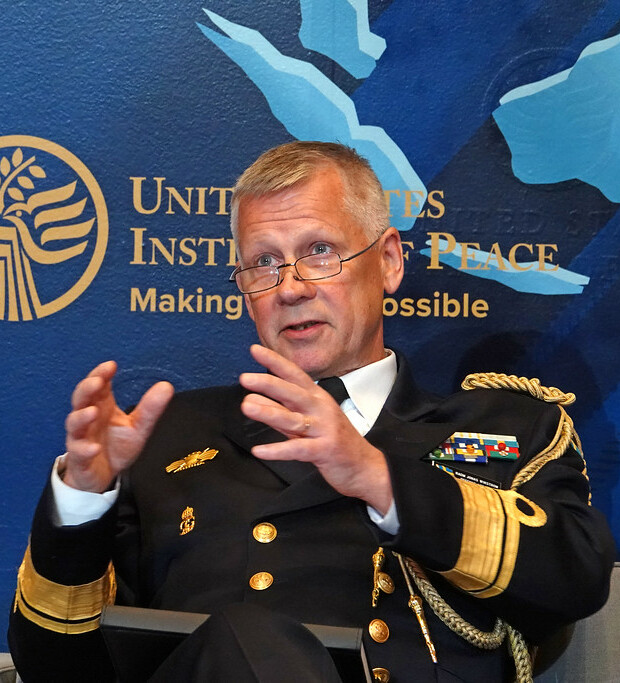
- Wikström in 2021
- Born: Jonas Atle Wikström; 28 June 1962 (age 64); Enköping, Sweden
- Military career
- Allegiance: Sweden
- Branch: Swedish Navy
- Service years: 1986–2023
- Rank: Rear Admiral
- Commands: 4th Naval Warfare Flotilla; J3 Operations, Joint Forces Command; Dep. Cmr EU NAVFOR
- Conflicts: Operation Atalanta

Rear Admiral Jonas Atle Wikström (born 28 June 1962) is a retired Swedish Navy officer. Wikström has served as commander of the 4th Naval Warfare Flotilla, as Deputy Operations Commander of the European Union Naval Force Somalia in Operation Atalanta, and as head of the Defence Planning Section in the Defence Staff. He also served as defence attaché in Washington, D.C.

== Early life ==
Wikström was born on 28 June 1962 in Enköping Parish in Enköping, Sweden.

== Career ==
Wikström graduated from the Royal Swedish Naval Academy in 1986 and was commissioned as a naval officer and was assigned as an acting sub-lieutenant to the navy the same year, where he was promoted to sub-lieutenant in 1988. He was promoted to lieutenant commander in 1995 and served in the second half of the 1990s in the 2nd Mine Warfare Division. He served on fiskeminsvepare ("fishing minesweepers"), coastal minesweepers (Hanö-class and Arkö-class), Landsort-class, and Styrsö-class mine countermeasures vessels.

After promotion to commander, he served as an ADC to His Majesty the King Carl XVI Gustaf from 2001 and head of Marine 3 in the Maritime Component Command in the Joint Forces Command in the Swedish Armed Forces Headquarters from 2007 to 2009. In 2009, he was promoted to captain, whereupon he was commander of the 4th Naval Warfare Flotilla from 2009 to 2013. In 2012, he carried out the Swenex 12-2 military exercise where he was commander of Task Group 04 and was deployed aboard HSwMS Trossö. Wikström was appointed head of J3 Operations in the Joint Forces Command (Insatsstaben, INSS) in the Swedish Armed Forces Headquarters from 1 October 2013. Wikström served as Operations Commander during a military operation to search for an allegedly damaged foreign submarine in Kanholmsfjärden in the Stockholm archipelago in October 2014.

Wikström served as Deputy Operations Commander of the European Union Naval Force Somalia in Operation Atalanta with combating of piracy off the coast of Somalia between 21 January 2016 and 29 June 2016. He then served until 2 October 2016 in the Joint Forces Command in the Swedish Armed Forces Headquarters, after which he attended the Oxford Changing Character of War Program in United Kingdom until 9 December 2016. Wikström was head of the Defence Planning Section (Försvarsplaneringssektionen) in the Policy and Plans Department (Inriktning- och planeringsavdelningen, LEDS INRI) in the Defence Staff in the Swedish Armed Forces Headquarters from 1 April 2017 (with appointment no later than 31 March 2020). Rear admiral (lower half) Wikström was appointed defence attaché at the Embassy of Sweden, Washington, D.C. from 1 March 2021 and was simultaneously appointed rear admiral.

Wikström retired in the fall of 2023 and has since been serving part-time as a reserve officer at the Headquarters. On 13 May 2024, he was elected as the new chairman of the Naval Officers' Private Support Fund (Sjöofficerarnas Enskilda Understödsfond, SEU), succeeding Major General Bengt Andersson.

== Personal life ==
Wikström is married to Johanna. They have two children.

He is a member of the non-profit organization Totalförsvar Öland (Total Defense Öland).

== Dates of rank ==
- 1986 – Acting sub-lieutenant
- 1988 – Sub-lieutenant
- ???? – Lieutenant
- 1995 – Lieutenant commander
- ???? – Commander
- 2009 – Captain
- ???? – Rear admiral (lower half)
- 1 March 2021 – Rear admiral

== Awards and decorations ==
=== Swedish ===
- (Sweden) For Zealous and Devoted Service of the Realm
- (Sweden) King Carl XVI Gustaf's Jubilee Commemorative Medal II (2013)
- (Sweden) H. M. The King's Medal, 8th size gold (silver-gilt) medal worn on the chest suspended by the Order of the Seraphim ribbon (2007)
- (Sweden) Swedish Armed Forces Conscript Medal
- (Sweden) 4th Naval Mine Warfare Flotilla Commemorative Medal (4. minkrigsflottiljens minnesmedalj)

etc.

=== Foreign ===
- (Italy) Commander of the Order of Merit of the Italian Republic (14 January 2019)
- (Iceland) Grand Knight's Cross of the Order of the Falcon (17 January 2018)
- (European Union) European Security and Defence Policy Service Medal – EUNAVFOR ATALANTA
- (Portugal) Commander of the Military Order of Aviz (2 May 2008)

etc.

== Honours ==
- Member of the Royal Swedish Society of Naval Sciences (2009)
- Honorary chairman of Kamratföreningen Flottans män

Military offices
Preceded by Jan Thörnqvist	4th Naval Warfare Flotilla; 2009–2013	Succeeded by Ewa Skoog Haslum
