= 4th Naval Warfare Flotilla (Sweden) =

Swedish naval unit

Coordinates: 59.077083°N 18.138472°E

- Fjärde sjöstridsflottiljen
- Active: 1994–present
- Country: Sweden
- Branch: Swedish Navy
- Size: Flotilla
- Headquarters: Haninge Garrison, Stockholm
- Mottos: Prudentia et constantia (Note: Introduced in the 1970s for the 6th Mine Clearance Division (6. minröjningsavdelningen).) ("Thoroughness and perseverance")
- March: "Vivu esperanto" (Note: The march was adopted and established on 30 June 1994.)

Commanders
- Commander: Capt Anna Jönsson

The 4th Naval Warfare Flotilla (Swedish: Fjärde sjöstridsflottiljen or 4. sjöstridsflj) is Swedish Navy flotilla located in the county of Stockholm, active since 1994. The flotilla is located at Haninge Garrison and shares its location with the 1st Marine Regiment.

== History ==
The flotilla was established on 1 July 1994 as the 2nd Mine Warfare Section, following the Coastal Fleet's decision to consolidate minelayers and minesweepers into a single unit.

Following the changes introduced by the Swedish Government in the Defence Act of 2004, the flotilla was reorganized into a multi-purpose unit rather than being solely focused on mine warfare.

== Organization ==
As of 2024, the peacetime organization of the 4th Naval Warfare Flotilla is as follows:

- 4th Naval Warfare Flotilla
  - 4th Flotilla Staff
  - 41st Corvette Division
    - HSwMS Gävle (K22)
    - HSwMS Sundsvall (K24)
    - HSwMS Visby (K31)
    - HSwMS Helsingborg (K32)
  - 42nd Mine Clearance Division
    - HSwMS Koster (M73)
    - HSwMS Kullen (M74)
    - HSwMS Ven (M76)
    - HSwMS Spårö (M12)
  - 44th Clearance Diver Division

== Commanders ==
- 1994–1997: Christer Nordling
- 1997–2000: Johan Fischerström
- 2000–2003: Claes-Göran Hagström
- 2003–2006: Lennart Bengtsson
- 2006–2009: Jan Thörnqvist
- 2009–2013: Jonas Wikström
- 2013–2013: Pontus Krohn (acting)
- 2014–2017: Ewa Skoog Haslum
- 2017–2022: Fredrik Palmquist
- 2022–2024: Anders Bäckström
- 2024–2026: Martin Göth
- 2026–present: Anna Jönsson

== Attributes ==
Name	Translation	From		To
2. minkrigsavdelningen	2nd Mine Warfare Section	1994-07-01	–	2000-06-30
4. minkrigsflottiljen	4th Mine Warfare Flotilla	2000-07-01	–	2004-12-31
4. sjöstridsflottiljen	4th Naval Warfare Flotilla	2005-01-01	–	
Designation		From		To
2. minkriavd		1994-07-01	–	2000-06-30
4. minkriflj		2000-07-01	–	2004-12-31
4. sjöstridsflj		2005-01-01	–	
Location		From		To
Berga Naval Base		1994-07-01	–	2004-12-31
Muskö Naval Base		2005-01-01	–	2008-??-??
Berga Naval Base		2009-??-??	–	
