= HSwMS Visby (K31) =

Swedish Visby-class corvette

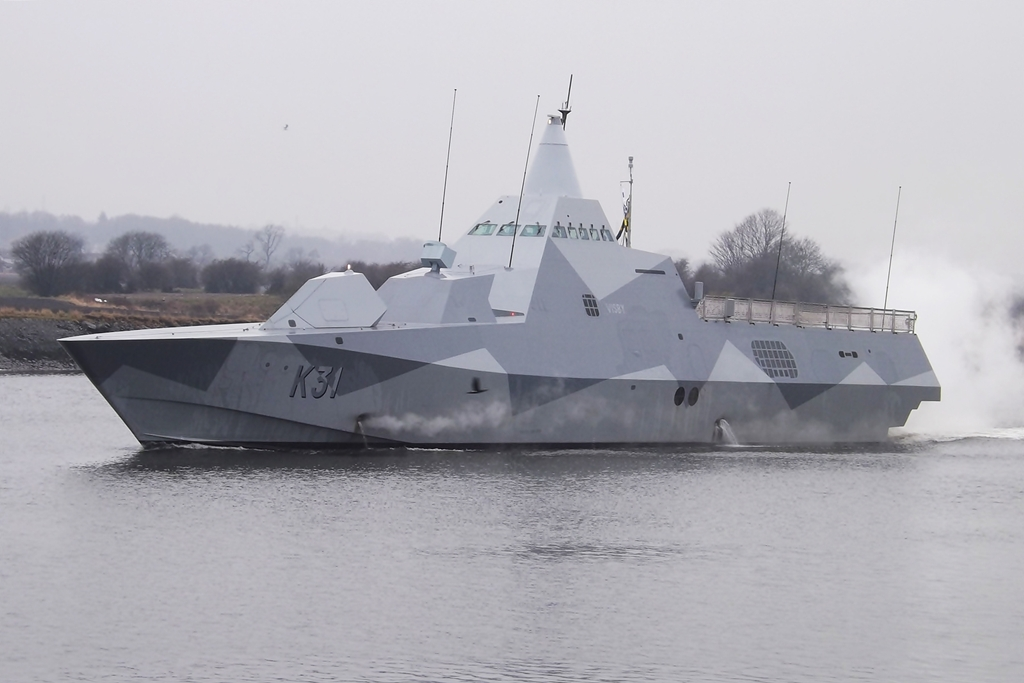
- HSwMS Visby in 2013

History
- Name: Visby
- Namesake: Visby
- Ordered: 1995
- Builder: Kockums
- Laid down: 17 February 1995
- Launched: 8 June 2000
- Commissioned: 16 September 2002
- In service: 2012
- Home port: Berga
- Identification: MMSI number: 265823000; Pennant number: K31; Callsign: SMLD
- Status: Active
- Badge

General characteristics
- Class & type: Visby-class corvette
- Displacement: 660 t (650 long tons)
- Length: 72.6 m (238 ft 2 in)
- Beam: 10.4 m (34 ft 1 in)
- Draft: 2.5 m (8 ft 2 in)
- Propulsion: CODAG; 2 ×KaMeWa Waterjets; 4 × Honeywell TF 50 A gas turbines, total rating 16 MW; 2 × MTU Friedrichshafen 16V 2000 N90 diesel engines, total rating 2.6 MW
- Speed: 45+ knots
- Complement: 27 officers; 16 conscripts
- Sensors & processing systems: Ericsson Sea Giraffe ABM 3D surveillance radar; Ceros 200 Fire control radar system; Condor CS-3701 Tactical Radar Surveillance System; Hull-mounted sonar; Towed array sonar system; Variable depth sonar
- Electronic warfare & decoys: Rheinmetall Waffe Munition MASS (Multi-Ammunition Softkill) decoy system
- Armament: 1 × Bofors 57 mm gun Mk 3; 8 × RBS15 Mk2 AShM; 4 × 40cm Torped 45; ASW grenade launchers; Mines & depth charges
- Aviation facilities: Helipad

Service record
- Part of: 4th Naval Warfare Flotilla

HSwMS Visby (K31) is the lead ship of the Visby-class corvettes. It was created as a stealth ship, and underwent a decade long testing phase before it entered service with the Swedish Navy.

== Design and description ==
HSwMS Visby is the lead ship of the Visby-class corvettes. It was built by Kockums at the Karlskrona naval base, and was the first of four vessels of the class which are designed for coastal warfare.

The hull of the vessel is made of carbon fiber reinforced plastic, a stealth technology, in order to make the vessel difficult to detect by other forces. A minimum of external equipment is stored outside of the vessel, with equipment such as liferafts being stored inside the hull. This hull also reduces the weight of the vessel by around half. It was intended to be radar silent until it moves within 30 kilometres (19 mi) of an enemy vessel, resulting in designer John Nilsson saying of it, "Naval officers fall in love with [this] ship. It's not classically beautiful. In fact it looks like a lunchbox. But it has better maneuverability and can achieve that level of stealth."

== Construction and career ==
Visby completed sea trials in 2004. The ship underwent a further eight years of tests by the Swedish Defence Procurement Agency, before being delivered to the Navy in late 2012. These tests included the firing of the RBS15 Mk2 AShM, which took place in July 2012. In October 2014, Visby was amongst the Swedish vessels patrolling in an exercise for finding the source of "foreign underwater activity" which was rumoured to be a Russian submarine, identified by distress call. This rumour was denied by the Swedish authorities, who described it as an "intelligence operation".

After Sweden joined NATO in March 2024, it was announced on January 21 2025 that Visby would be part of Standing NATO Maritime Group 1, contributing to operations under the Baltic Sentry initiative. The announcement comes after a recent series of suspected sabotages against underwater cables and other installations in the Baltic Sea area. This marks the first time in history that a Swedish naval ship is placed directly under NATO command.
