= Oceanic-Creations =

Construction material production company

Oceanic-Creations AB was a company based in Sweden, founded in 1986 around the so-called Oceanic-Creations Composite Technology (OCCT), a special process for producing a carbon fibre based construction material. The company had a production plant in Varna, Bulgaria. Media reported about a floating, pyramid shaped Hotel Maya being constructed there for deployment in Cancún, Mexico.

The OCCT process was originally developed for navy stealth ships (including the Visby class corvette) at Kockums shipyards in Karlskrona, Sweden, and treated as a military secret. After the innovation was declassified in 2002, Oceanic-Creations AB started to explore other markets. The OCCT process is not patented, but kept as a trade secret on a 20-year license from Kockums.

The company went bankrupt in 2011.
