= Swedish Naval Warfare Centre =

- Sjöstridsskolan
- Active: 2005–present
- Country: Sweden
- Allegiance: Swedish Armed Forces
- Branch: Swedish Navy
- Type: School
- Role: Develop and educate
- Part of: Swedish Armed Forces Headquarters
- Garrison/HQ: Karlskrona
- Motto: MEMENTO AUDERE ("Remember to always dare")
- March: "Marinens officershögskolas marsch" (Dohlin) (Note: The march was adopted in 2007. It was used by the Swedish Navy Officers’ College (Marinens officershögskola, MOHS) from 1984 to 1998.)

Commanders
- Current commander: Erik Öhrn

The Swedish Naval Warfare Centre (Swedish: Sjöstridsskolan, SSS) is a joint naval school of the Swedish Navy which has been operating since 2005. The unit is based in Karlskrona Garrison in Karlskrona.

== History ==
Prior to the Defence Act of 2004, the Swedish government considered that the Swedish Armed Forces' education system was both irrational and cost-driven, as training in technical service was carried out at the Försvarsmaktens Halmstadsskolor (FMHS) in Halmstad, the Swedish Army Technical School (Arméns tekniska skola, ATS) in Östersund and at the Swedish Naval Schools (Örlogsskolorna, ÖS) in Karlskrona and Haninge/Berga. In addition, the Swedish Armed Forces educated personnel subjected to national service at the educational platforms, as well as at the Uppland Regiment (S 1) and the Swedish Air Force's Uppsala Schools (Flygvapnets Uppsalaskolor, F 20). In its place, the government considered that all technical education, which also included the technical education at the Naval Schools, would be gathered to a new school, the Swedish Armed Forces Technical School (Försvarsmaktens tekniska skola, FMTS), located in Halmstad. Furthermore, in its proposition, the government considered that the two naval bases, the East Coast Naval Base and the South Coast Naval Base, would be replaced by one naval base, the Naval Base, based in Karlskrona, which meant that the focus of the Swedish Navy's operations was moved entirely to Karlskrona. Thus, the remaining education at the Naval Schools together with the Swedish Armed Forces Diving and Naval Medicine Centre in Berga would be moved to Karlskrona. Furthermore, the government proposed that the Swedish Amphibious Combat School (Amfibiestridsskolan, AmfSS) should be disbanded, and the amphibious education should be moved to Karlskrona. Furthermore, a naval combat school, the Swedish Naval Warfare Centre, would be formed in Karlskrona in order to thereby obtain coordination gains linked to the Naval Base. On 31 December 2004, the Naval Schools were disbanded, and as of 1 January 2005, the school was transferred to a decommissioning organization until the disbandment was completed by 30 June 2006. On 1 January 2005, the Swedish Naval Warfare Centre in Karlskrona was formed. The Swedish Naval Warfare Centre became the center of the naval education, though not the technical education. Since 1 January 2014, the Marinens provturskommando (PTK M) is part of the Swedish Naval Warfare Centre.

== Heraldry and traditions ==
=== Coat of arms ===
The coat of arms of the Swedish Naval Warfare Centre was previously used by the Royal Swedish Naval Academy from 1867 to 1987 and the Swedish Navy Staff College (Marinens krigshögskola, MKHS) from 1987 to 1998. Blazon: "Azure, an anchor erect cabled surmounting two gunbarrels of older pattern, or. The shield surmounted an open chaplet or."

=== Marches ===
When the Swedish Naval Warfare Centre was formed, the "Vår flotta" (Widner) was adopted as unit march, which was then taken over from the Swedish Naval Schools (Örlogsskolorna). In 2007, the "Marinens officershögskolas marsch" (Dohlin) was adopted as unit march, which previously was used by the Swedish Navy Officers’ College (Marinens officershögskola, MOHS) from 1984 to 1998.

=== Traditions ===
The Swedish Naval Warfare Centre primarily has tradition responsibility for the Swedish Naval Schools (Örlogsskolorna), the Swedish Amphibious Combat School (Amfibiestridsskolan, AmfSS) and the Swedish Navy Diving Center (MDC), as well as older ships, which have the same name as the school's current vessels. Secondly, it has tradition responsibility for the Karlskrona Naval Training Schools (Karlskrona örlogsskolor, KÖS) and the Berga Naval Training Schools, the Swedish Coastal Artillery School and Combat School (Kustartilleriets skjutskola/stridsskola, KAS), the Swedish Navy Non-Commissioned Officers’ School (Marinens underofficersskola, MUOS) and older junior non-commissioned officer and naval schools (included in the naval districts/naval stations and regiments), the Swedish Auxiliary Naval Corps and the Cabin Boy Corps (Skeppsgossekåren).

== Commanding officers ==
- 2005–2006: Johan Eneroth
- 2006–2011: Håkan Magnusson
- 2011–2014: Erik Andersson
- 2014–2017: Per Jenvald
- 2017–2019: Magnus Jönsson
- 2019–2023: Jonas Källestedt
- 2023–20xx: Erik Öhrn

== Names, designations and locations ==
Name	Translation	From		To
Sjöstridsskolan	Swedish Naval Warfare Centre	2005-01-01	–	
Designation		From		To
SSS		2005-01-01	–	
Location		From		To
Karlskrona Garrison		2005-01-01	–	
