= Lerums gymnasium =

Coordinates: 57.7739°N 12.2747°E

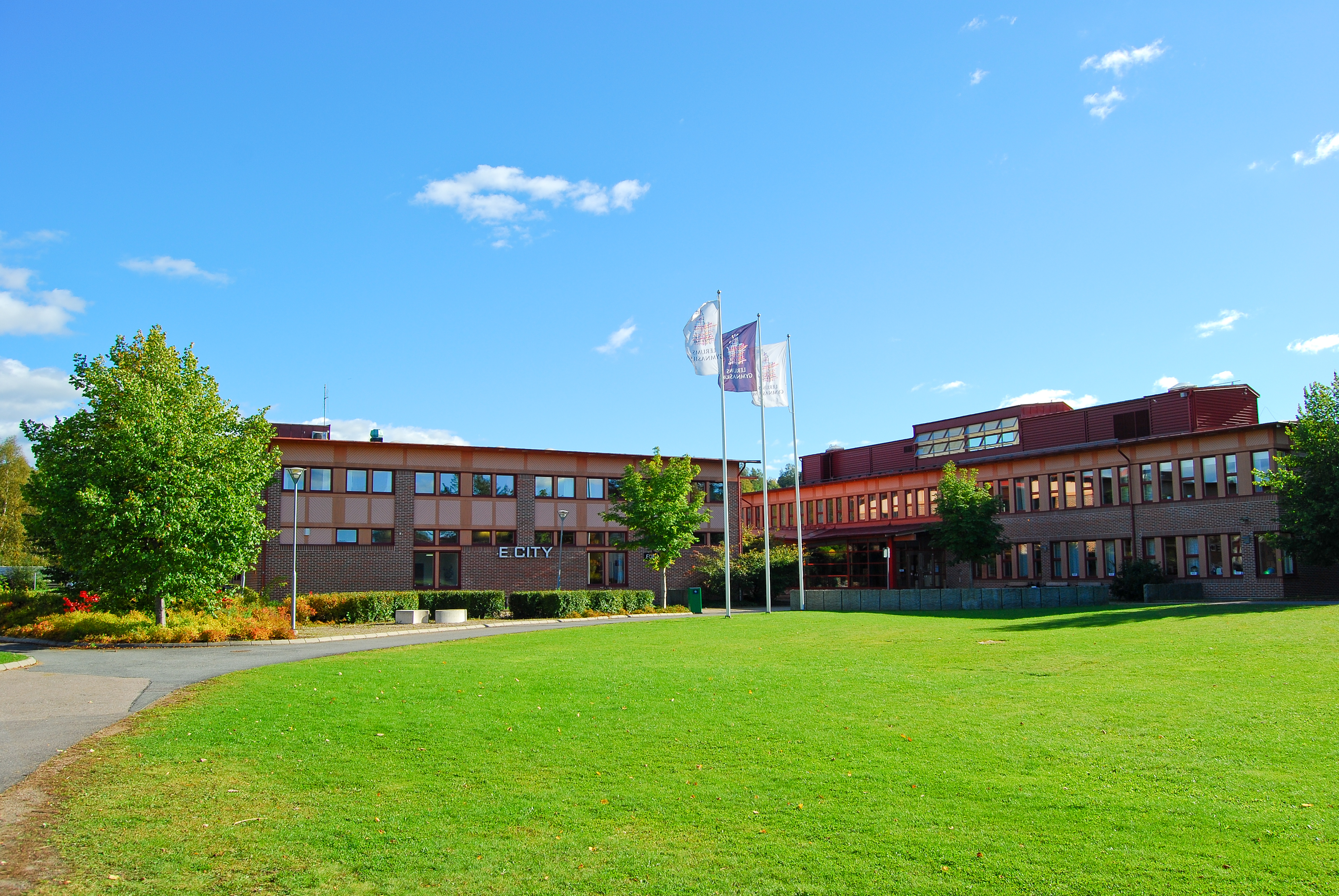
Lerums gymnasium - the building "Granen".

Lerums gymnasium is an upper secondary school in Lerum, Sweden, 20 kilometres outside of Gothenburg.

It's a relatively young school, founded as late as in 1980. The first school building was a converted bottle cap factory; since then the school area has grown into a small "campus" with several old and new buildings of varying style, all set in lush parkland.

Today, Lerum Secondary School has about 1,500 students aged 16-19 with approximately 200 staffmembers. There is also a section for adult students. The school offers 14 national educational programmes, both vocational, aesthetic and academically orientated ones. In addition, the school offers young yachting talents a possibility of combining sail training with school studies within the Sailing College, an integrated part of the school, based on Lake Aspen. Also integrated in the school is the College of Arts and Crafts located at Nääs Castle, the very first of its kind in Sweden, with a history going back 120 years.
