= Lerum =

City in Västergötland, Sweden

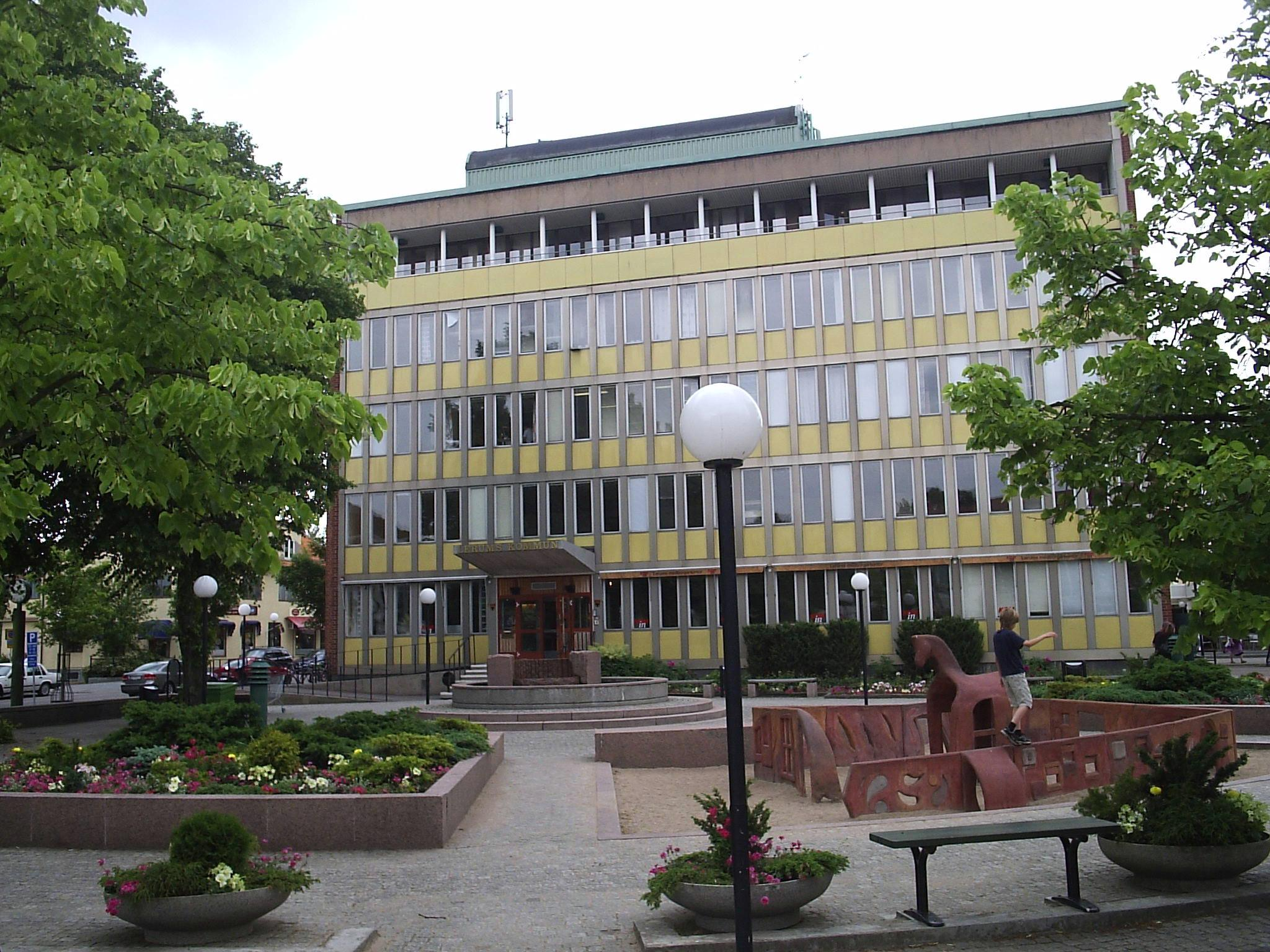
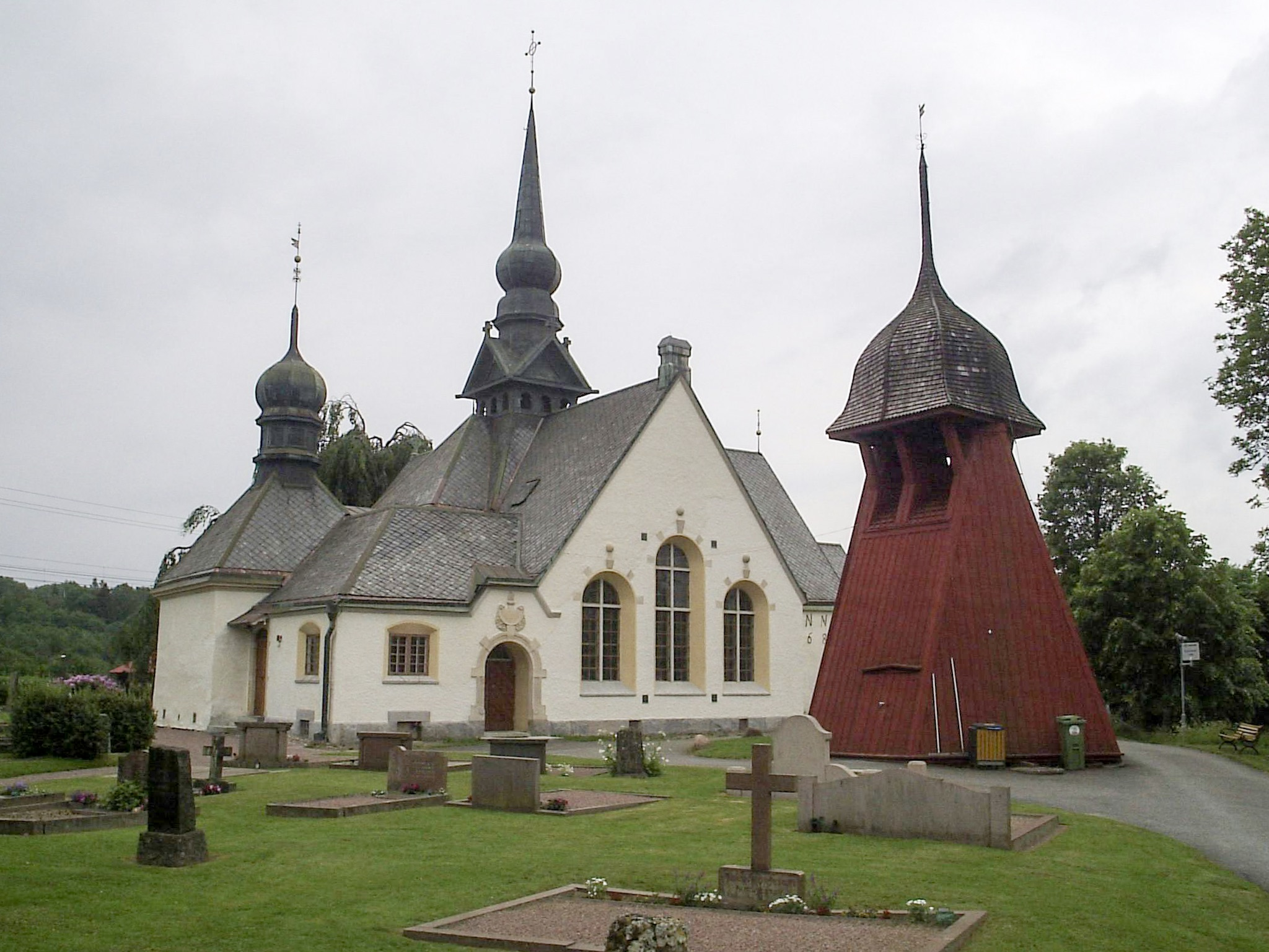
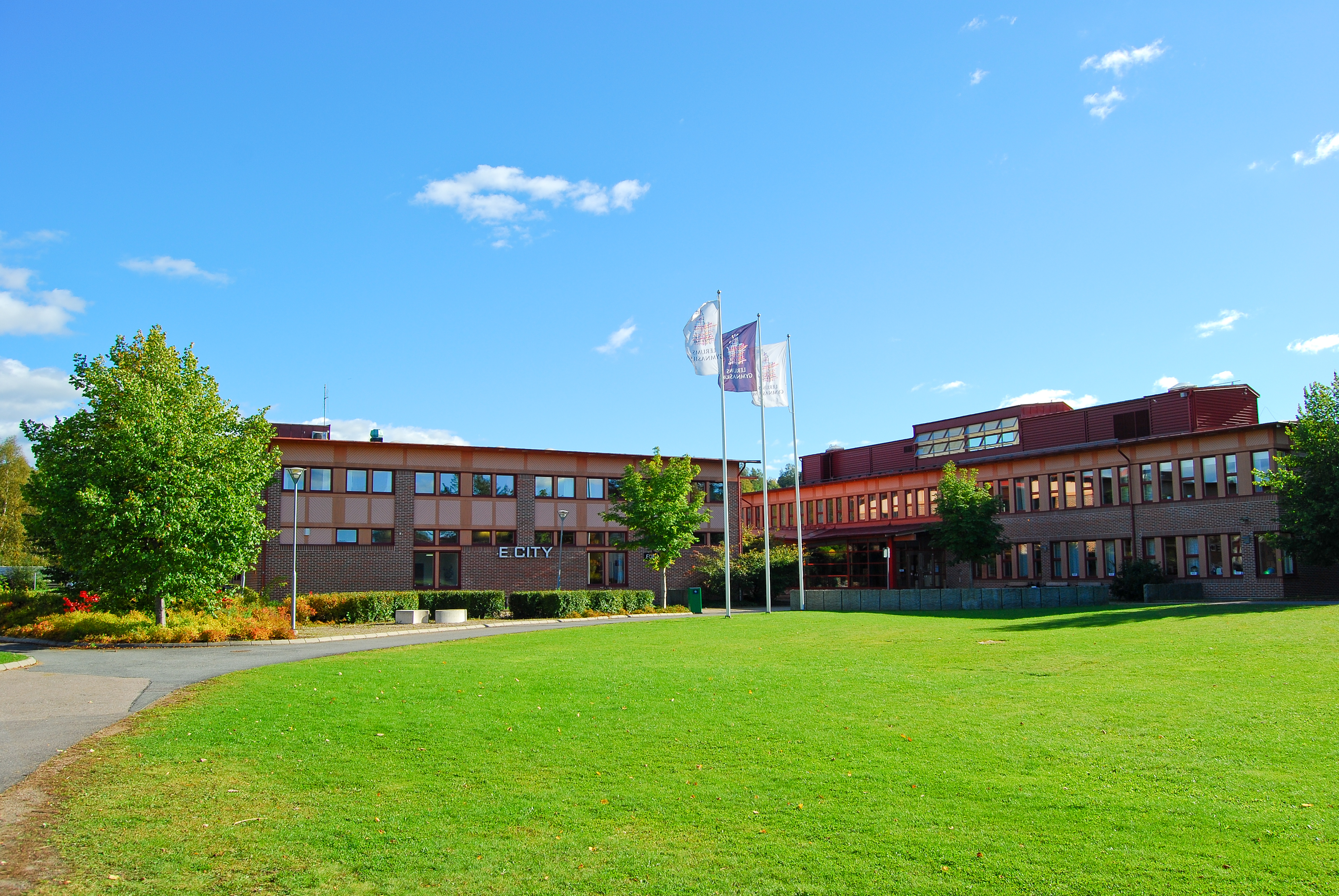
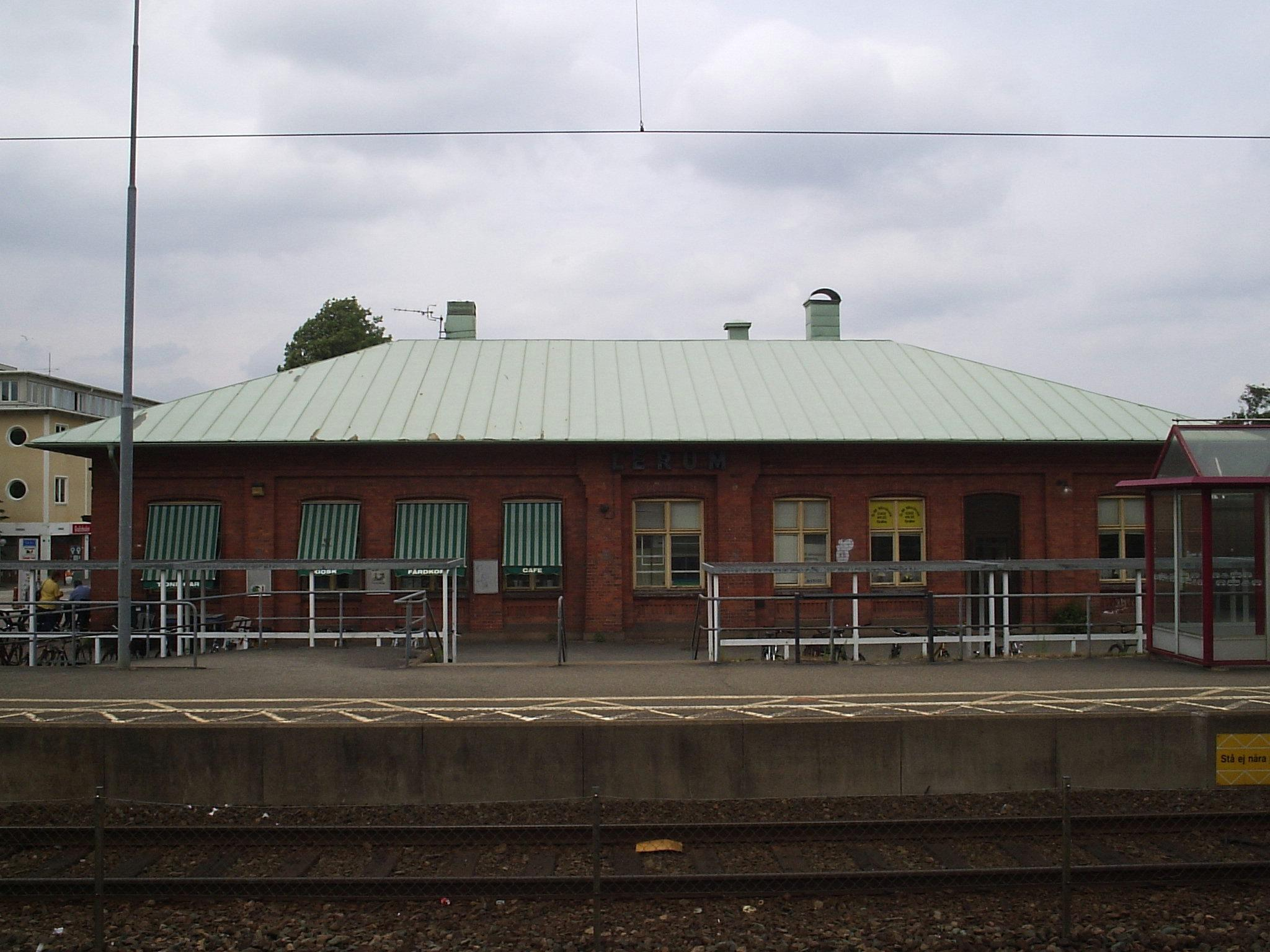
- Lerum Townhall Lerum Church Lerums gymnasium Lerum railway station

- Location within Västra Götaland Location within Sweden
- Coordinates: 57°46′N 12°18′E
- Country: Sweden
- Province: Västergötland
- County: Västra Götaland County
- Municipality: Lerum Municipality

Area
  - Total: 14.27 km^{2} (5.51 sq mi)

Population (31 December 2010)
  - Total: 16,855
  - Density: 1,181/km^{2} (3,060/sq mi)
- Time zone: UTC+1 (CET)
  - Summer (DST): UTC+2 (CEST)

Lerum is a locality and the seat of Lerum Municipality in Västra Götaland County, Sweden. It had 43 570 inhabitants in 2024.

== Overview ==
Lerum has a station on the Gothenburg commuter rail system and is a suburb of Gothenburg.

The river of Säveån runs through Lerum municipality. 5 kilometres (3 miles) of it is surrounded by the nature reserve Säveåns Naturreservat, where bridges dating back as far as the 18th century as well as a variety of animal life and beautiful nature can be found.

== Lerum train crash ==
Lerum hit the world's news bulletins on 16 November 1987, when two Intercity trains collided just outside the local station, killing 9 and injuring 140.

A control cable to the trailroad switches had been incorrectly reconnected after being dug up accidentally. When traffic was finally allowed to pass the station, the Gothenburg bound train was switched over to the opposite track where an outbound train was arriving, after a mistake in communication between the repairer and the traffic leader. An off-duty trainmaster, reading the paper in one of the locomotives, heard the train driver say "Helvete nu smäller det" (a colloquialism which roughly translates to: "Damn, this will be a crash"). He managed to open the side door and leap out, the trains collided when he was still in the air and despite doing this at 100 km/h (62 mph) he survived with just a broken foot.

The involved locomotives were Rc4 1292 and 1300, they were scrapped on the spot.

== Schools ==
There are several schools in Lerum. (incomplete list)

- Torpskolan
- Rydsbergsskolan
- Aspenässkolan
- Lerums gymnasium
- Knappekullaskolan
- Almekärrsskolan
- Hulanskolan

== Sports ==
The following sports clubs are located in Lerum:

- Lerums BK
- Lerums IS
- FBC Lerum
- Lerums Landhockey
- Lerum Friidrott

== International relations ==
=== Twin towns – Sister cities ===
Lerum is twinned with:

- Aalborg, Denmark
- Baldone, Latvia

== Notable people ==
- Joel Berghult, musician and YouTuber
- Olof Stahre, Officer and Equestrian
