= Visby-class corvette =

Swedish stealth missile corvettes

Visby-class
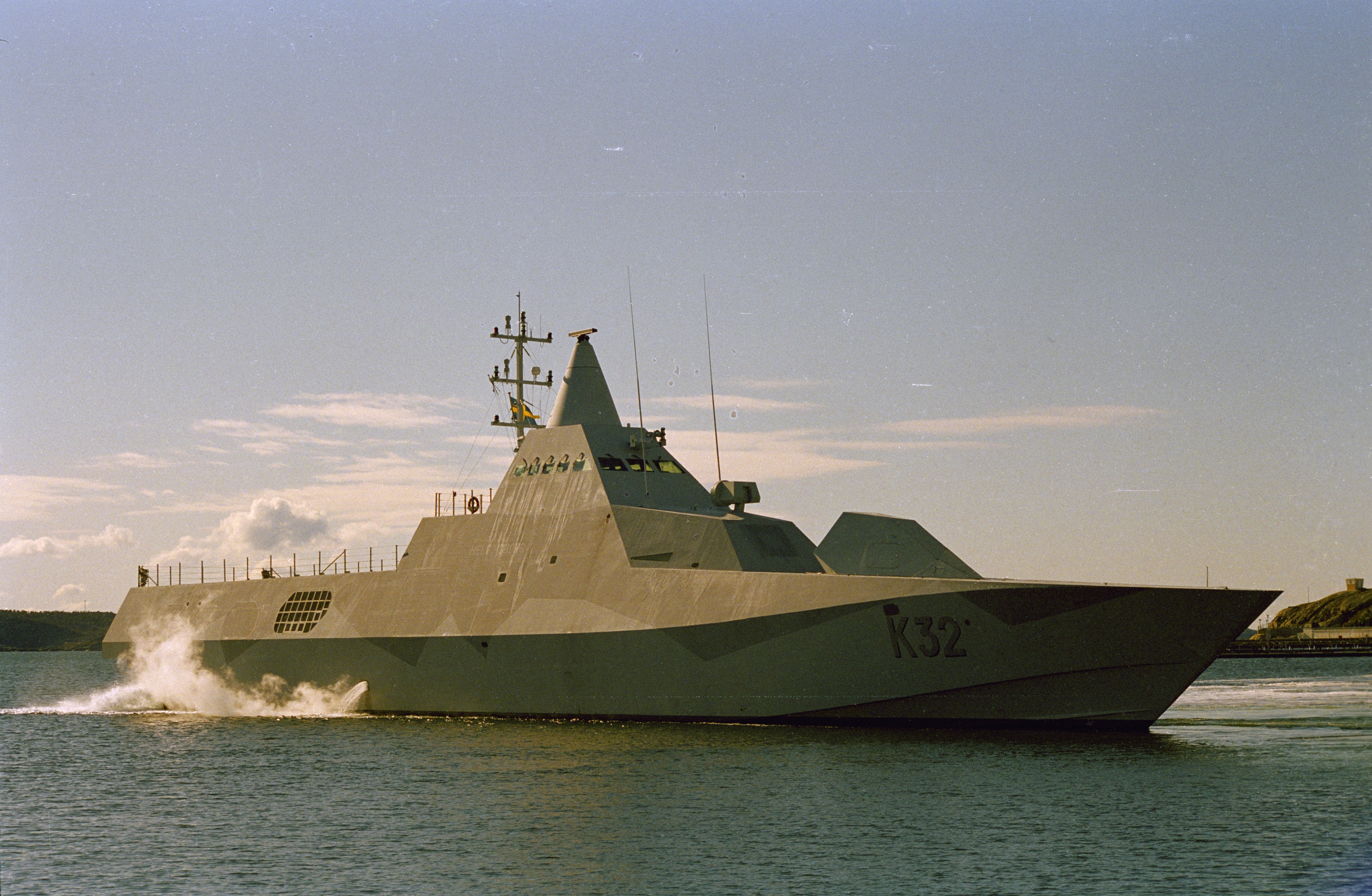
- Helsingborg outside of Karlskrona, 2003

Class overview
- Builders: Kockums
- Operators: Swedish Navy
- Preceded by: Göteborg class
- Cost: US$184 million
- In commission: 2009–present
- Planned: 6
- Completed: 5
- Canceled: 1
- Active: 5

General characteristics
- Type: Corvette
- Displacement: 640 tonnes
- Length: 72.7 m (238 ft 6 in)
- Beam: 10.4 m (34 ft 1 in)
- Draught: 2.4 m (7 ft 10 in)
- Propulsion: CODOG; 4 × Vericor TF50A gas turbines, total rating 16 MW (21,000 hp); 2 × MTU Friedrichshafen 16V 2000 N90 diesel engines, total rating 2.6 MW (3,500 hp); 3 × generators of 270 kW (360 hp) each; 2 × 125SII Kamewa Waterjets
- Speed: 35 knots (65 km/h; 40 mph)+
- Range: 2,500 nmi (4,600 km; 2,900 mi) at 15 kn (28 km/h; 17 mph)
- Complement: 43
- Sensors & processing systems: Systems: Saab 9LV combat management system; Sea Ceptor; Surface and air sensors: Saab Sea GIRAFFE AMB 3D PESA surveillance radar; Saab Ceros 200 stealth fire control radar system; Sonars: General Dynamics Canada Hydra multi-sonar suite; GDC C-Tech CHMS-90 Hull-mounted sonar; Hydroscience Technologies passive towed array sonar system; GDC C-Tech CVDS-2 dual-frequency active, variable depth sonar; Navigation: Saab 9LV Cetris (GPS/INS data fusion); Communications: Link 16 / Link 22; ASW communications and processing system: SAES SDL-SS (Sensor Data Link – Surface Segment): SDL-AS (Sensor Data Link – Air Segment)
- Electronic warfare & decoys: Condor CS-3701 Radar Warning Receiver (ESM); Rheinmetall MASS countermeasures
- Armament: Guns: 1 × Bofors 57mm mk3 gun; Missiles: 2 × 4 RBS15 launchers, with: Current: 8 × RBS15 Mk2 anti-ship cruise missiles; Future: 8 × RBS15 Mk4 Gungir anti-ship and land attack cruise missile; 3-cells ExLS (Extensible Launching System); MBDA CAMM; ASW weapons: Torpedo launcher: Saab Dynamics Tub m/20 (400 mm (16 in)): Torped 47 (SLWT); Torped 45; Mines and depth charges: Mine F80; Mine F8; Mine F23 / F24; ASW 127 mm (5.0 in) rocket-powered grenade launchers
- Aviation facilities: AW109 helicopter pad

The Visby class is a class of five stealth corvettes in service with the Swedish Navy. It is the latest class of corvette adopted by the navy after the Göteborg and Stockholm-class corvettes. Its design emphasizes low visibility radar cross-section and infrared signature, and the class has received widespread international attention because of its capabilities as a stealth ship. The first ship in the class is named after Visby, the main city on the island of Gotland.

The Visby ships were designed by Swedish Defence Materiel Administration (FMV) and built by Saab Kockums AB in Karlskrona. The first ship of the class was launched in 2000, but production then suffered repeated delays. The fifth and final ship was delivered in 2015.

== Design ==
The hull is constructed with a sandwich design consisting of a PVC core with a carbon fibre and vinyl laminate (see also the Oceanic-Creations spin-off). There are multiple advantages to using composite materials in ship hulls. Good conductivity and surface flatness mean a low radar signature, while good heat insulation lowers the infrared signature and increases survivability in case of fire. The composite sandwich used is also non-magnetic, which lowers the magnetic signature. Composites are also very strong for their relative weight, and less weight means a higher top speed and better maneuverability. The composite weighs roughly 50% less than the equivalent strength steel.

Visby's angular tumblehome design reduces its radar signature. Jan Nilsson, one of the designers, told BBC News Online: "We are able to reduce the radar cross-section by 99%. That doesn't mean it's 99% invisible, it means that we have reduced its detection range." The 57 mm cannon barrel can be folded into the turret to reduce its cross-section.

== History ==
=== Visby Generation 1 ===
==== Background ====
Much of the design was based on the experiences learned from the experimental ship HSwMS Smyge. The class was originally designed to be divided into two subcategories where the last ship was optimized for surface combat and 4 others for submarine hunting; however, this was changed due to cutbacks.

A helicopter, such as the Agusta Westland A109M selected by Sweden, can land, take off, and refuel on the upper deck. A helicopter hangar was originally planned but was considered to be too cramped and was removed.

==== Production ====
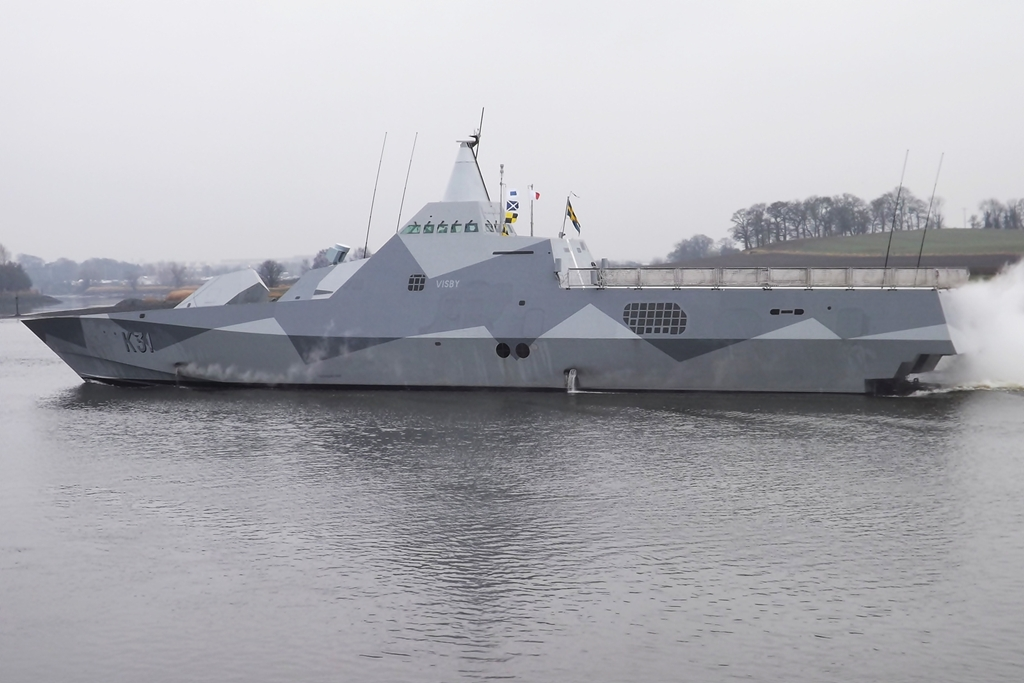
HSwMS Visby

The ships took an exceptionally long time from launch to delivery and the construction has been fraught with repeated delays. In 2008, the only weapons system that had been integrated and tested in HSwMS Visby was the gun.

Finally, on 16 December 2009, the next two of the corvettes, HSwMS Helsingborg and HSwMS Härnösand, were delivered to the Swedish Navy by the Swedish Defence Materiel Administration (known as the FMV, or Försvarets materielverk). The two ships were equipped with underwater and surface/air sensors fully integrated. However, the only weapon that had been integrated and test-fired on the ships was still the Bofors 57 Mk3 gun. It is known as the standard 4 by the FMV.

The standard 5 of the class was the one where the mine clearance systems, the helicopter landing capability, the anti-ship missiles and some additional stealth adaptation were implemented. Visby was the first of the corvettes to be upgraded to standard 5. On 22 March 2012, the FMV reported that the ship had been modified and that the system would be tested before reentering the Swedish Navy by the end of 2012.

Although the design of the ships originally called for the installation of surface-to-air missiles, on 18 September 2008 the Genomförandegruppen cancelled the project to rationalize the procurement of defence materiel for the Swedish defence.

==== Mid-life upgrade ====
In January 2021, the Swedish Defence Materiel Administration (FMV) and Saab signed a contract for the "Product Definition Phase" of a mid-life upgrade of the Visby class. An additional item of the contract involved the "Product Definition Phase" of the Visby Generation 2 corvettes. The contract had a value of SEK 190 million. The primary objective of this MLU is to extend its operational capacity and relevance beyond 2040. In that regard, the following aspects were decided:

- Modifications of the systems of the ships.
- Adding an air defence capability.
- Add the capability to operate the RBS 15 Mk3 as new anti-ship missile
- Add the capability to operate the Torped 47 (Saab Lightweight Torpedo)

In November 2023, the Swedish Navy ordered the CAMM (also known as Sea Ceptor) for the air-defence missiles that it wanted added to the ship.

In 2025, the Swedish Navy selected the Extensible Launching System (ExLS) as vertical launching system for the CAMM missiles. This system is provided by Lockheed Martin and is based on the Mk41 VLS. Each ExLS is composed of three cells, the same as on the Mk41. Three ExLS will be installed on each Visby-class ship, for a total of nine cells. Four CAMM missile can be installed in each cell of the ExLS, packaged in quad packs. This leads to a capacity of 36 CAMM missiles per ship.

In May 2025, the Swedish Navy announced that the start of the air-defence upgrade of the ships would be for 2026. Saab won the contract for this operation, and it is valued at SEK 1.6 billion.

=== Visby Generation 2 ===
==== Programme initiation ====
In January 2021, the Swedish Defence Materiel Administration (FMV) and Saab signed a contract for the Product Definition Phase of a mid-life upgrade of the Visby class. An additional item of the contract involved the Product Definition Phase of the Visby Generation 2 corvettes. The contract had a value of SEK 190 million.

In September 2021, some more information were shared by the FMV about this new generation. One expectation was to use proven systems, and that the corvette had a capacity to evolve, with systems capable to be integrated in a simple way. One operational requirement was that every system and equipment could be maintained in Sweden.

==== Cancellation ====
In November 2022, the supreme commander of the Swedish armed forces, General Micael Bydén, published his recommendations for how the armed forces should grow over the coming years at the request of the Swedish government. This included the recommendation that the Visby Gen 2 corvettes should be equipped with longer-range surface-to-air missiles than those which will be used on the "Visby Gen 1" in order for the ships to be able to act as part of NATO integrated air and missile defences. Further recommendations included modifications to the ships to increase their interoperability with both NATO's standing maritime groups and the Joint Expeditionary Force.

In February 2023, following the 2022 Russian invasion of Ukraine, Sweden decided to reconsider its naval format and to cancel the Visby Generation 2. Its ascension to NATO and the need for more capable platforms led to the decision to cancel the ship in favour of a clean sheet larger design.

As of June 2023, more details of a new class of corvettes, the Luleå class were shared by the Ministry of Defence. And in 2024, Babcock and Saab began their collaboration on the design of the class. However, the Swedish government concluded that the Swedish commitments required a larger vessel capable of long distance air defence and also regarded time being of the essence, which required a more off the shelf solution to be delivered in time. Thus, on 24 November 2025, Swedish Defence Minister Pål Jonson announced that Sweden in open tender would choose a supplier for the four frigates in early 2026 to be named the Luleå-class. In 2026 the French FDI frigate by Naval Group was selected as the baseline for the Luleå-class frigate

Försvarets Materielverk has meanwhile contracted SAAB Kockums AB for an upgrade program for the Visby class to bring the existing fleet up to version 6 after the development program was concluded in 2024.

== Units ==
Number	Ship name	Laid down	Launched	Commissioned	Service	Status	Coat of arms
K31	Visby	17 February 1995	8 June 2000	16 September 2002	3rd Naval Warfare Flotilla	Active	
K32	Helsingborg		27 June 2003	16 December 2009	4th Naval Warfare Flotilla	Active	
K33	Härnösand		16 December 2004	16 December 2009	4th Naval Warfare Flotilla	Active	
K34	Nyköping		18 August 2005	16 September 2015	3rd Naval Warfare Flotilla	Active	
K35	Karlstad		24 August 2006	16 September 2015	3rd Naval Warfare Flotilla	Active	
K36	Uddevalla	Cancelled					

All systems for the ship Uddevalla were acquired, but the ship was later cancelled.

== Gallery ==
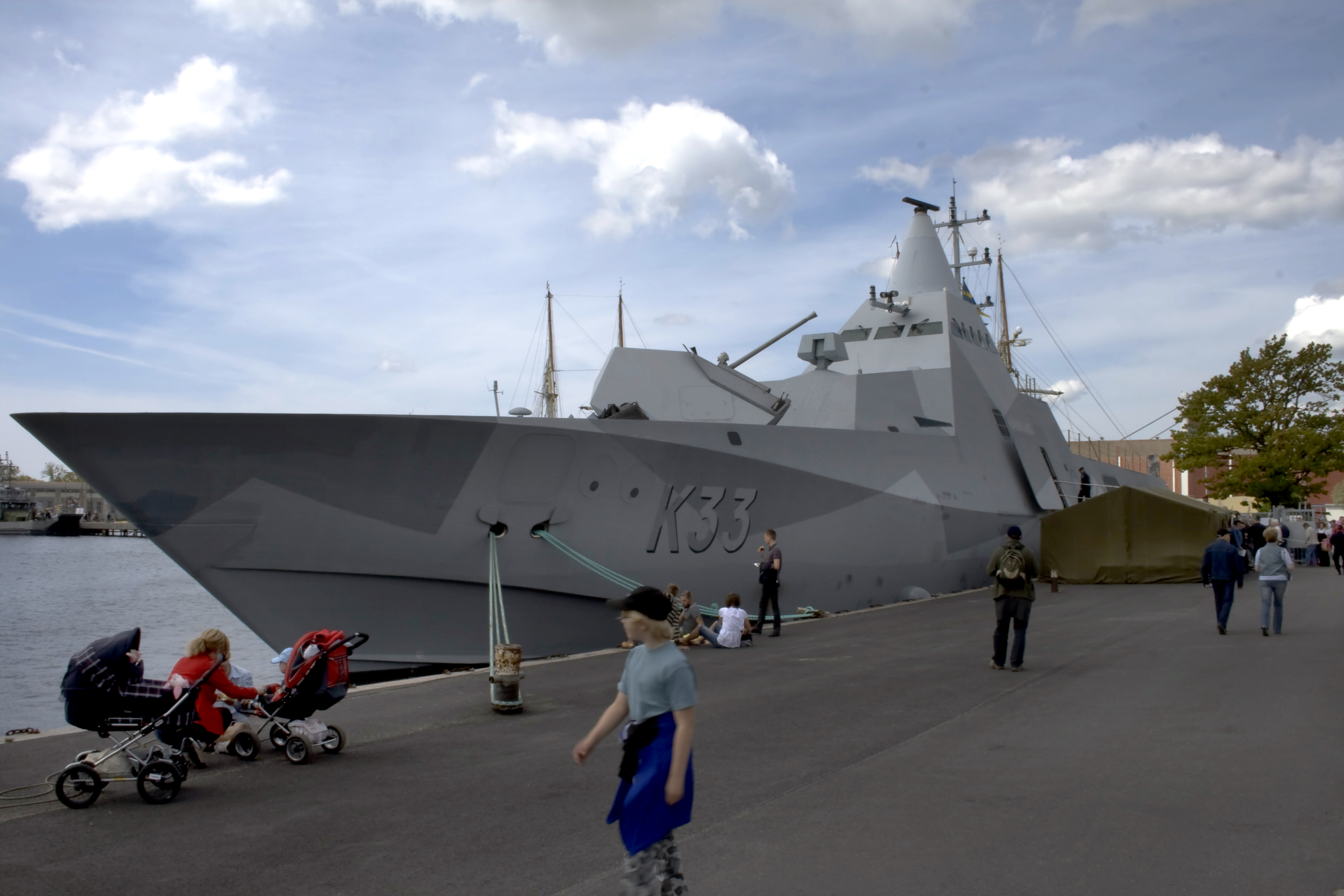
Härnösand at Karlskrona Naval Base

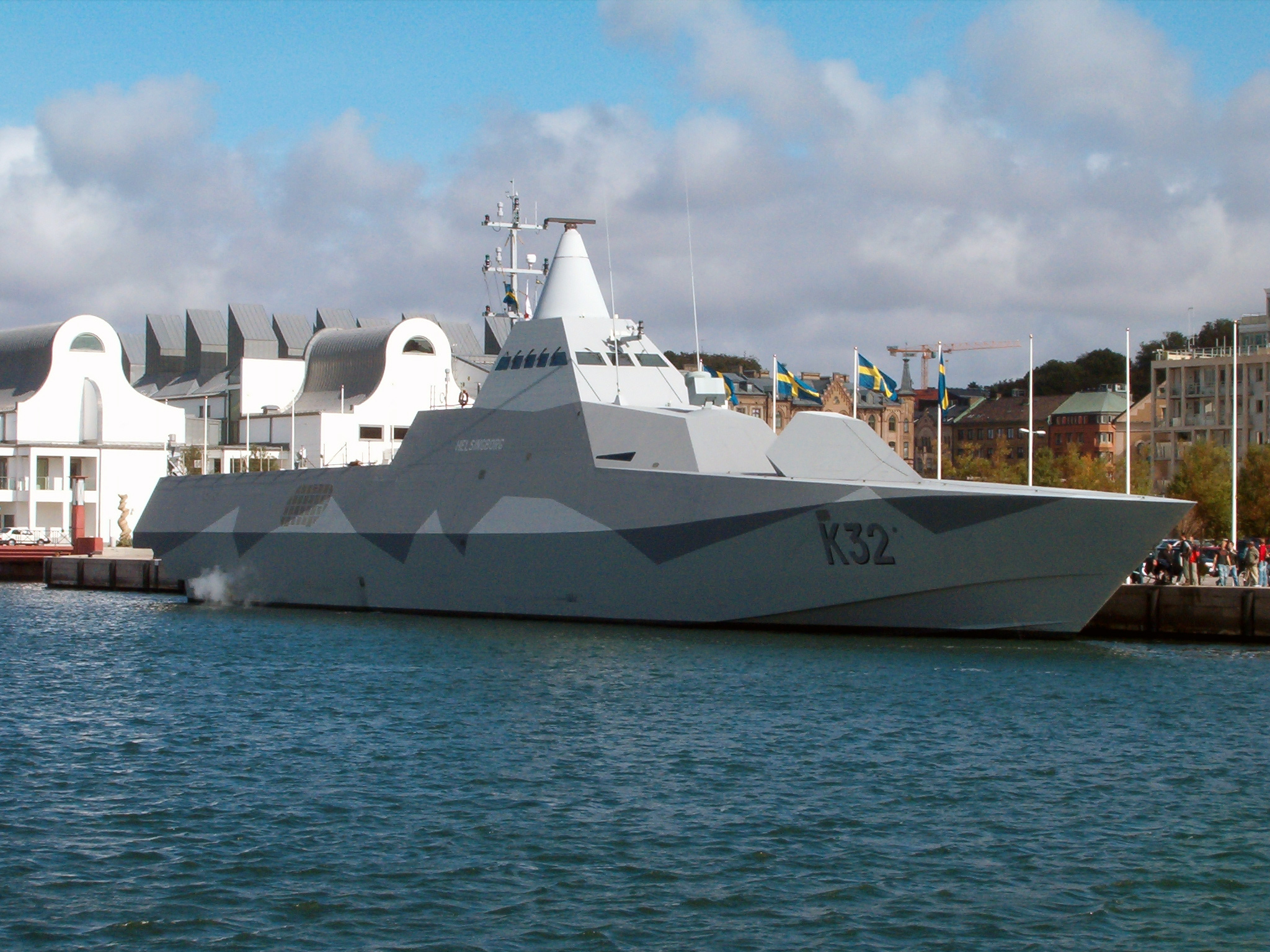
Helsingborg visiting her namesake

Helsingborg in Stockholm City

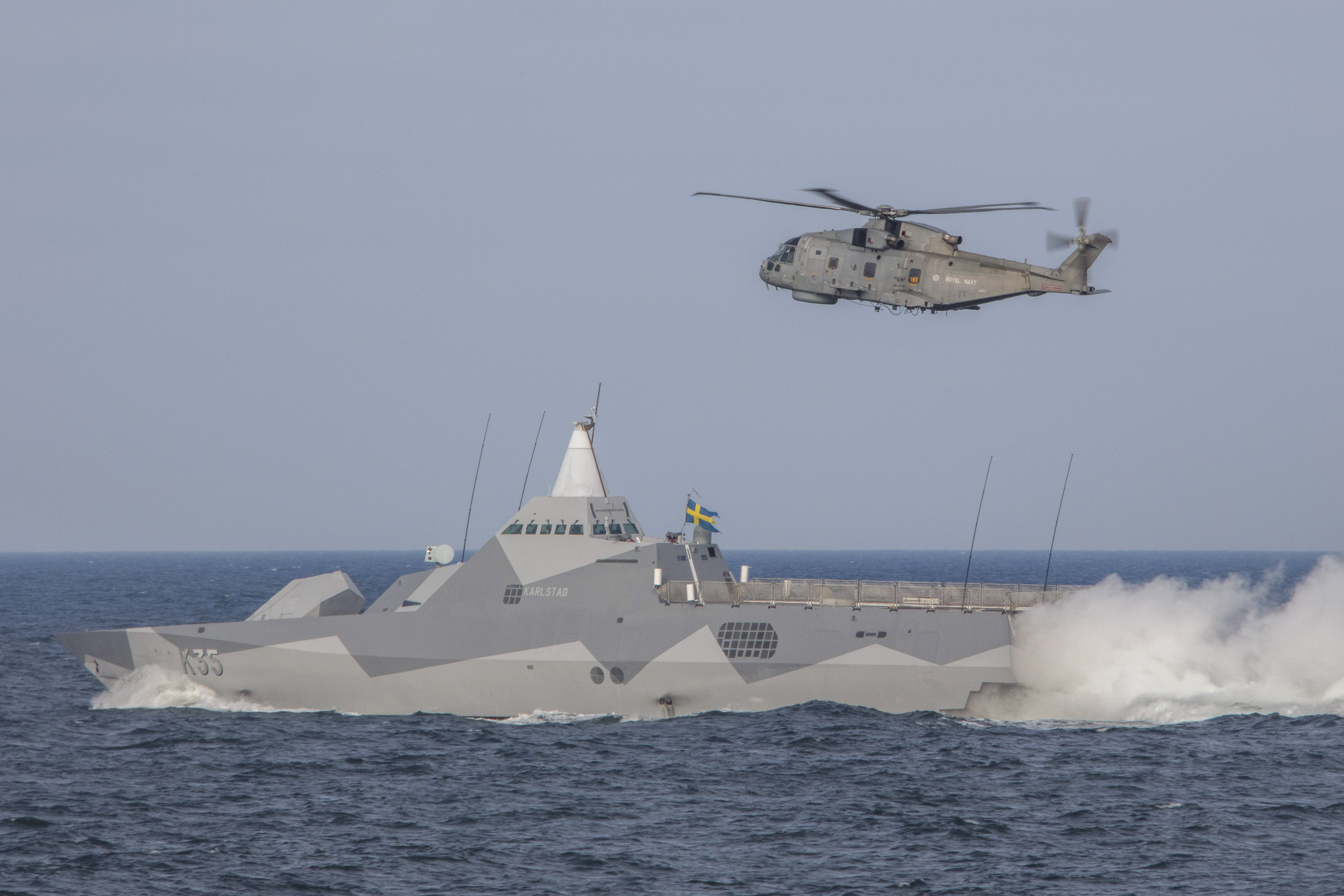
Karlstad with British Merlin helicopter during BALTOPS 20

== See also ==
- List of corvette classes in service

=== Equivalent modern corvettes ===
- Tuo Chiang-class corvette
- Baynunah-class corvette
- Hamina-class missile boat
- Type 022 missile boat
- Milgem-class corvette
- Skjold-class corvette
- Freedom-class littoral combat ship
- Independence-class littoral mission vessel
