= HSwMS Härnösand (K33) =

Swedish corvette

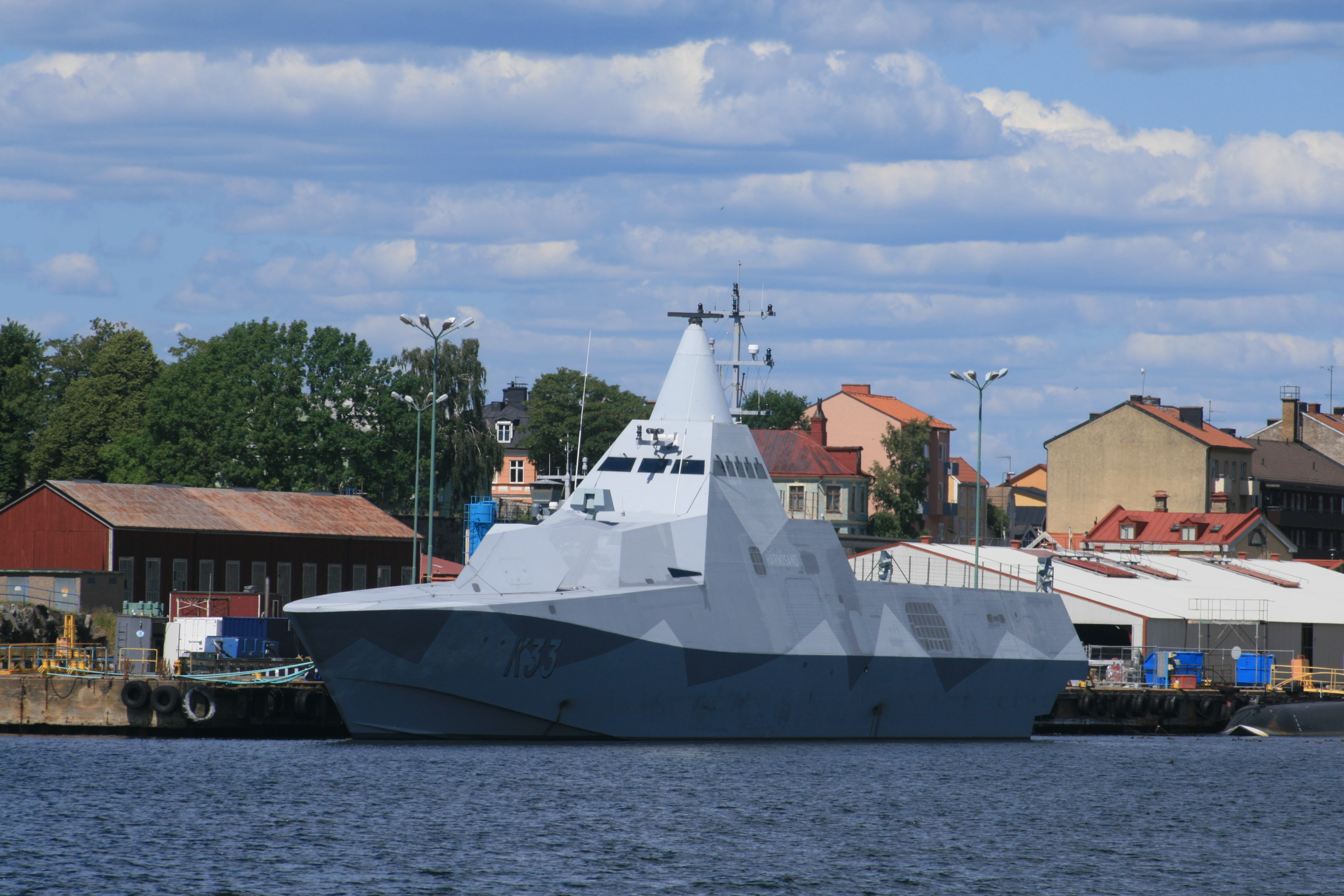
- HSwMS Härnösand on 14 July 2006

History

Sweden
- Name: Härnösand
- Namesake: Härnösand
- Ordered: 1996
- Builder: Kockums
- Launched: 16 December 2004
- Commissioned: 16 December 2009
- Home port: Karlskrona
- Identification: MMSI number: 266008000; Pennant number: K33; Callsign: SMLI
- Status: Active
- Badge

General characteristics
- Class & type: Visby-class corvette
- Displacement: 660 t (650 long tons)
- Length: 72.6 m (238 ft 2 in)
- Beam: 10.4 m (34 ft 1 in)
- Draft: 2.5 m (8 ft 2 in)
- Propulsion: CODAG; 2 ×KaMeWa Waterjets; 4 × Honeywell TF 50 A gas turbines, total rating 16 MW; 2 × MTU Friedrichshafen 16V 2000 N90 diesel engines, total rating 2.6 MW
- Speed: 35+ knots
- Complement: 27 officers; 16 conscripts
- Sensors & processing systems: Ericsson Sea Giraffe ABM 3D surveillance radar; Ceros 200 Fire control radar system; Condor CS-3701 Tactical Radar Surveillance System; Hull-mounted sonar; Towed array sonar system; Variable depth sonar
- Electronic warfare & decoys: Rheinmetall Waffe Munition MASS (Multi-Ammunition Softkill) decoy system
- Armament: 1 × Bofors 57 mm gun Mk 3; 8 × RBS15 Mk2 AShM; 4 × 40cm Torped 45; ASW grenade launchers; Mines & depth charges
- Aviation facilities: Helipad

HSwMS Härnösand (K33) is the third ship of the Visby-class corvettes ordered by the Swedish Government and built by Kockums. The Härnösand is designed for mine countermeasures and anti-submarine warfare.

== Design and description ==
HSwMS Härnösand is the third ship of the Visby-class corvettes. It was built by Kockums at the Karlskrona naval base, and was the first of four vessels of the class which are designed for coastal warfare.

The hull of the vessel is made of carbon fiber reinforced plastic, a stealth technology, in order to make the vessel difficult to detect by other forces. A minimum of external equipment is stored outside of the vessel, with equipment such as liferafts being stored inside the hull. This hull also reduces the weight of the vessel by around half. It was intended to be radar silent until it moves within 30 kilometres (19 mi) of an enemy vessel, resulting in designer John Nillson saying of it, "Naval officers fall in love with [this] ship. It's not classically beautiful. In fact it looks like a lunchbox. But it has better maneuverability and can achieve that level of stealth."

== Construction and career ==
Härnösand was launched 16 December 2004 and named by crown princess Victoria. She was commissioned on 16 December 2009.
