= Berga Naval Base =

Swedish naval base

Coordinates: 59.08°N 18.14°E

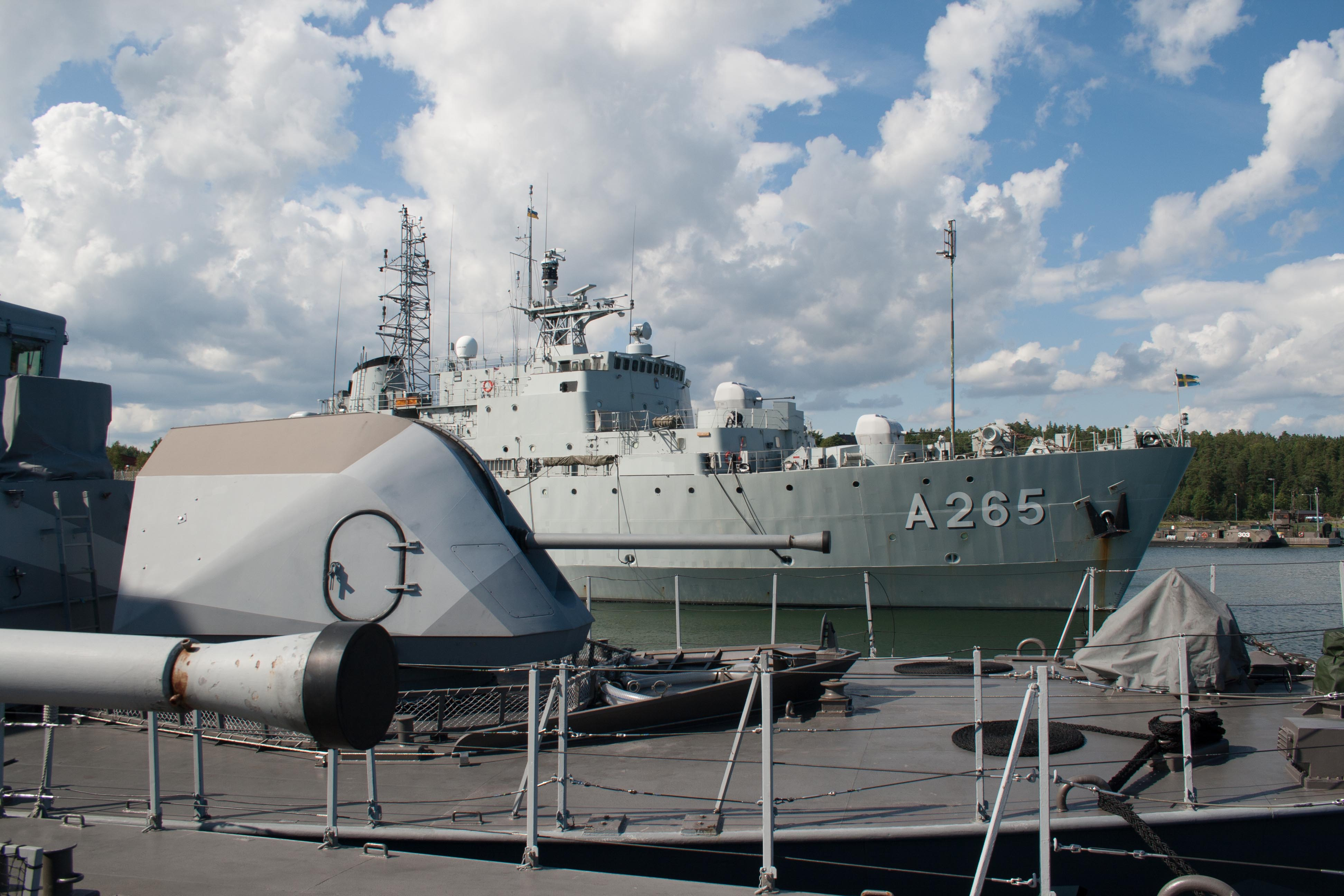
Naval ships moored at Berga Naval Base.

Berga Naval Base (Swedish: Berga örlogsbas) is a naval base of the Swedish Navy located in the Hårsfjärden fjard near Berga, Haninge Municipality. Today it is the home of the 4th Naval Warfare Flotilla, the 1st Marine Regiment and Home Guard unit Södertörn Group (Södertörnsgruppen).

== History ==
In the late 1800s, the Swedish Navy began using Hårsfjärden as a training area. Shooting warnings were read in the area's churches and a shooting target workshop was built in a bay on Vitsgarn opposite Märsgarn at Hårsfjärden. From 1904, Hårsfjärden began to be used more permanently as a base for the Coastal Fleet's combat and signal schools and for naval mine training and more. In 1905 it was decided to set up a target depot for a combat school at Vitsgarn. The depot met a great need and grew steadily. From 1911 to 1921, the Swedish state gradually acquired more land for the navy, including at western Vitsgarn. The experience of the navy's preparedness and exercises during the World War I meant that the depot at Hårsfjärden largely came to serve as a forward operating base for the entire mobilized part of the navy. Predecessors to the Artillery School at Berga were schools and training facilities on the islands of Alvsta Långholmar, Vitsgarn and Märsgarn outside Hårsfjärden. During World War I, target depots were developed and bridges and other facilities were built at Märsgarn. The exercises on Horsfjärden were intensified. Heavy artillery was now used and a few larger decommissioned ships were sunk as targets in Hårsfjärden.

Before the World War II, the navy began to consider moving the naval base in Stockholm off the inner waterways, but when the war broke out the navy had to settle for improving and expanding the existing archipelago facilities. During the war, Hårsfjärden and the Muskö area became the southern center of the archipelago surrounded by minefields and air defenses, as well as an outer and inner defense line of coastal batteries. The bay between Vitsgarn and Märsgarn became an important naval port where seaplane and submarine facilities were built. In 1944, the Riksdag decided that the Swedish state would acquire Berga Castle after the late and large landowner Helge Ax:son Johnson. The area included a strip of water that stretched from Vitså harbor to Näringsberg and was 3.5 km long and 800 meters wide. In addition to the strip, there was also a part of the area where Berga Agricultural School was located, with an area of 1,025 hectares. The purchase price for the acquisition of the property was SEK 2,635,000. The coastal strip was divided into naval port and naval schools. The hunting ground was transformed into a training area. The Berga Naval Training Schools started operating in 1946, then as the Swedish Navy Non-Commissioned Officers' School (Marinens underofficersskola, MUOS). The first wave of staff and families moved in. In Västerhaninge a whole block was also built for the families of the navy.

The Berga Naval Training Schools had the main task of training personnel, both conscripts and regular staff, in seamanship and basic military training. At the schools there was also some vocational training. The Berga Naval Training Schools were formed by relocating the training at Skeppsholmen in Stockholm to Berga. On 1 July 1946, operations at Berga Naval Training Schools began with teaching in the Non-Commissioned Officers School's chief mate and machinist programs, while the craftsmanship, economy and coastal artillery programs began on 1 October. On 21 October 1946, His Royal Highness Crown Prince Gustaf Adolf performed the inauguration of the Swedish Navy Non-Commissioned Officers' School. In the summer of 1949, construction began on a facility for training in torpedo and submarine service. In 1948–1949, the Submarine and ASW School (Ubåts- och ubåtsjaktskolan) began training at Berga for both commanders and conscripts. Parts of the training were placed to the submarine training facility "Valrossen". Following the Defence Act of 2004, Berga Naval Base is the training ground for the 1st Marine Regiment and the location of the Home Guard unit Södertörn Group (Södertörnsgruppen). From autumn 2008 the navy has also returned in the form of the 4th Naval Warfare Flotilla. With the Defence Act of 2004, the Swedish Naval Schools (Örlogsskolorna, ÖS) was disbanded and replaced by the Swedish Naval Warfare Centre, with a main location in Karlskrona.

== Current units ==
- 4th Naval Warfare Flotilla (4. sjöstridsflj)
- 1st Marine Regiment (Amf 1)
- Södertörn Group (Södertörnsgruppen, UGS)
