= Herron =

Herron may refer to:

== People ==
- Herron (name)

== Places ==
- Herron, Western Australia, Australia
- Herron, Michigan, USA
- Herron, Montana, USA
- Herrön, Nynäshamn Municipality – an island in the Stockholm archipelago and Nynäshamn Municipality, Stockholm County, Sweden
- Herrön, Karlstad Municipality – an island and settlement in Karlstad Municipality, Värmland County, Sweden
- Herron Island, an island in central Case Inlet, Washington, U.S.A.
- Herron Run, a creek in West Virginia, U.S.A.
- Herron River, a river in Alaska, U.S.A.
- Herron Glacier, a glacier in Alaska, U.S.A.

== Facilities and structures ==
- Herron Airport (FAA id: 7G1), New Cumberland, West Virginia, U.S.A.
- Herron station, an East Busway station on Herron Avenue, in Pittsburgh, Pennsylvania, U.S.A.
- Herron High School in Indianapolis, Indiana, USA
- Herron School of Art at the Indiana University–Purdue University Indianapolis, Indianapolis, Indiana, USA
- CHSLD Herron, a long-term care facility for the elderly in Dorval, Montreal, Quebec, Canada

== Other uses ==
- Herron Pharmaceuticals, an Australian manufacturer of pharmaceutical products
- The Herron II; Koufos v C Czarnikow Ltd (1969), an English contract law case

== See also ==
- Herrön (disambiguation)
- Herron's Mills, Ontario, Canada
- Herrons Corners, Ontario, Canada
- Herron-Morton Place Historic District in downtown Indianapolis, Indiana, USA
- The Herron Arch 1 (public art) a sculpture by James Wille Faust in Indiana University–Purdue University Indianapolis, Indianapolis, Indiana, USA
- USCGC Point Herron (WPB-82318), a U.S. Coast Guard clipper
- Heron (disambiguation)
- Harron (surname)
