= Naval museum complex Balaklava =

Museum in Balaklava, Crimea

Coordinates: 44°29′56″N 33°35′46″E

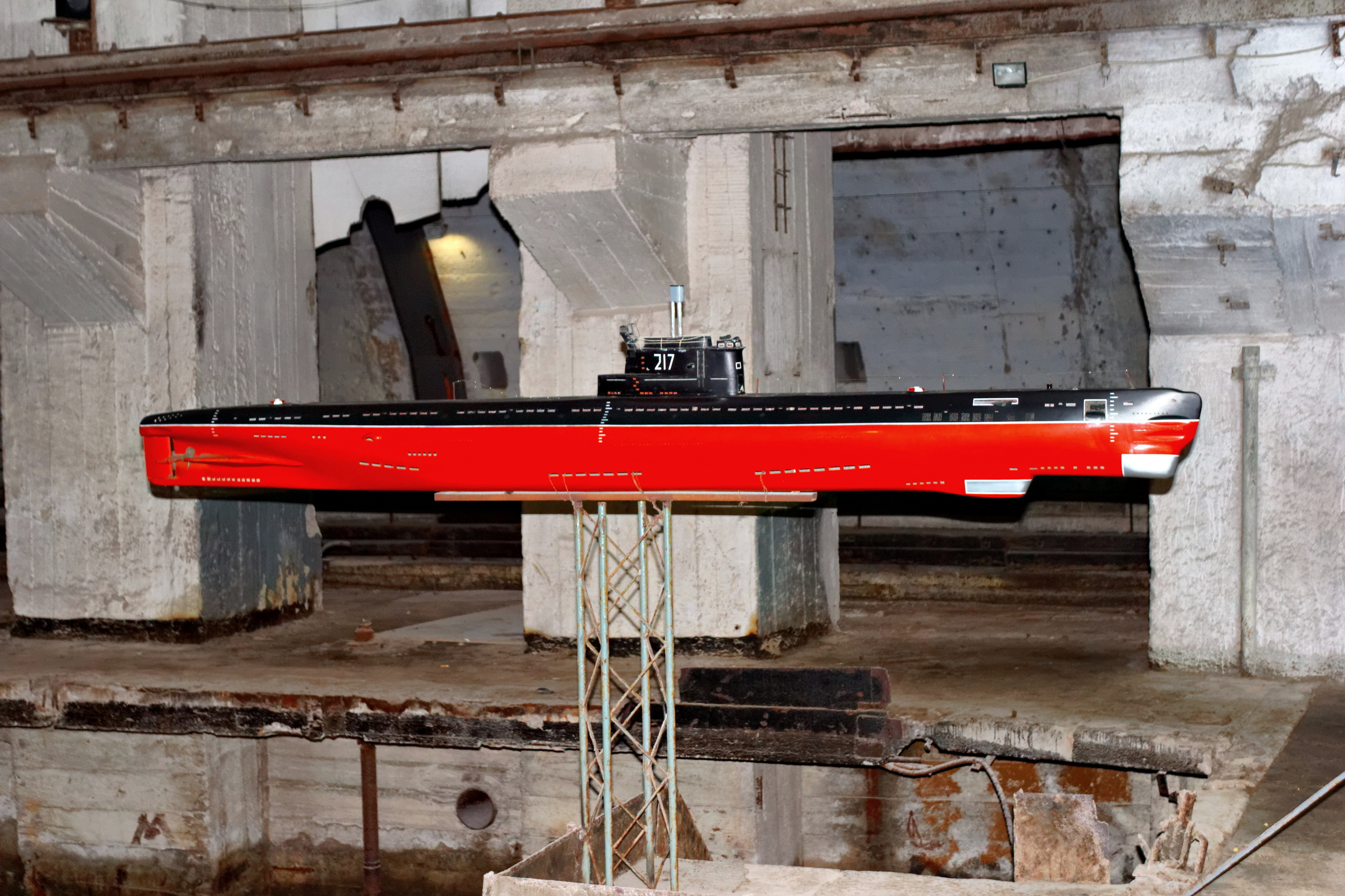
Model submarine of Project 613, Balaklava Naval Museum

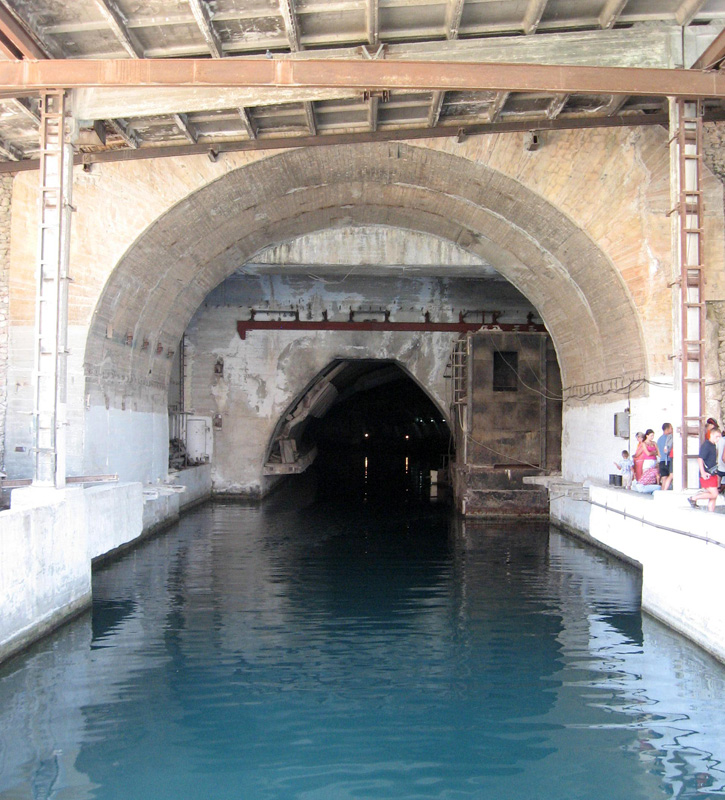
Entrance tunnel to old Soviet submarine base.

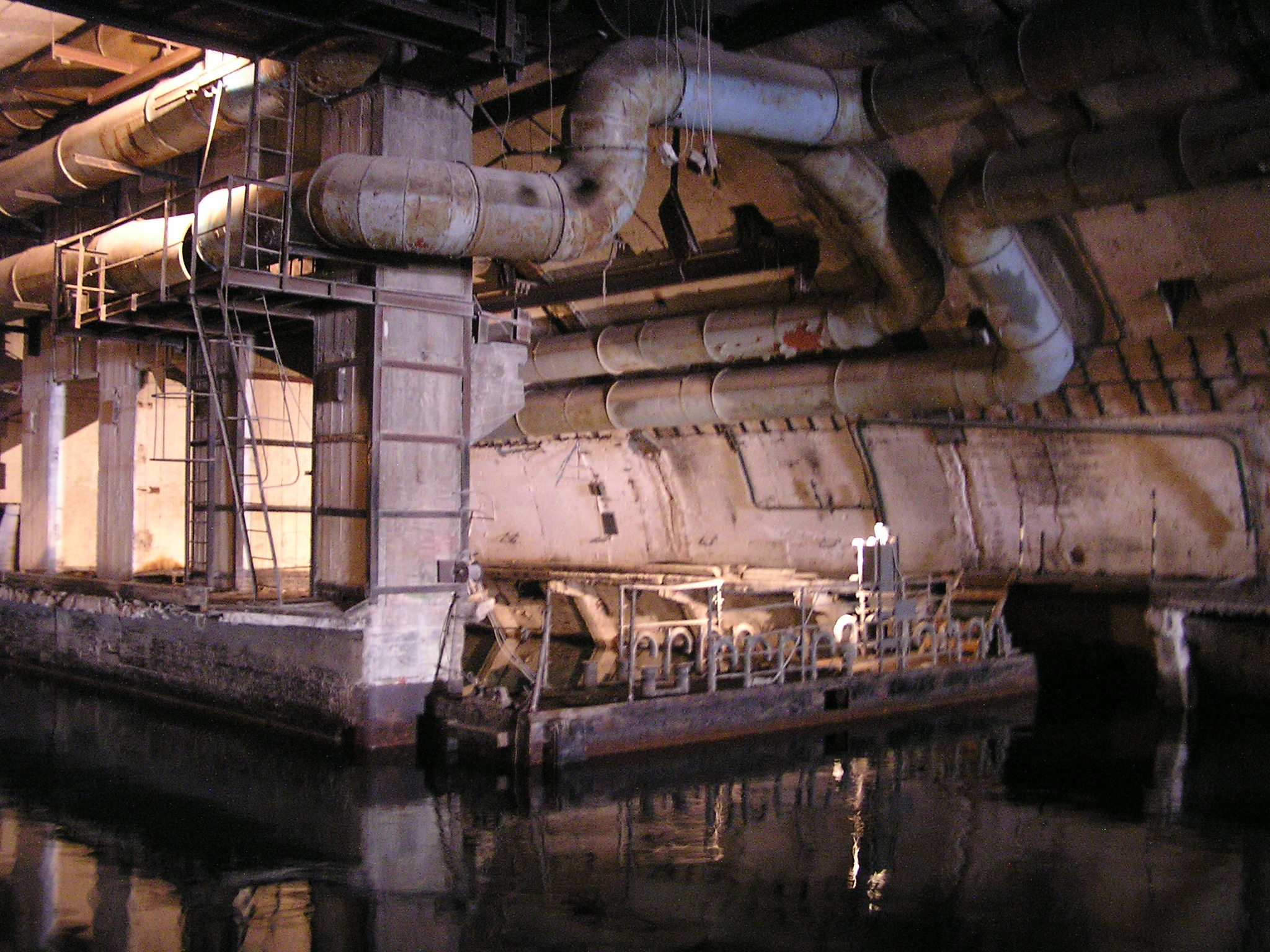
Old Soviet submarine pen

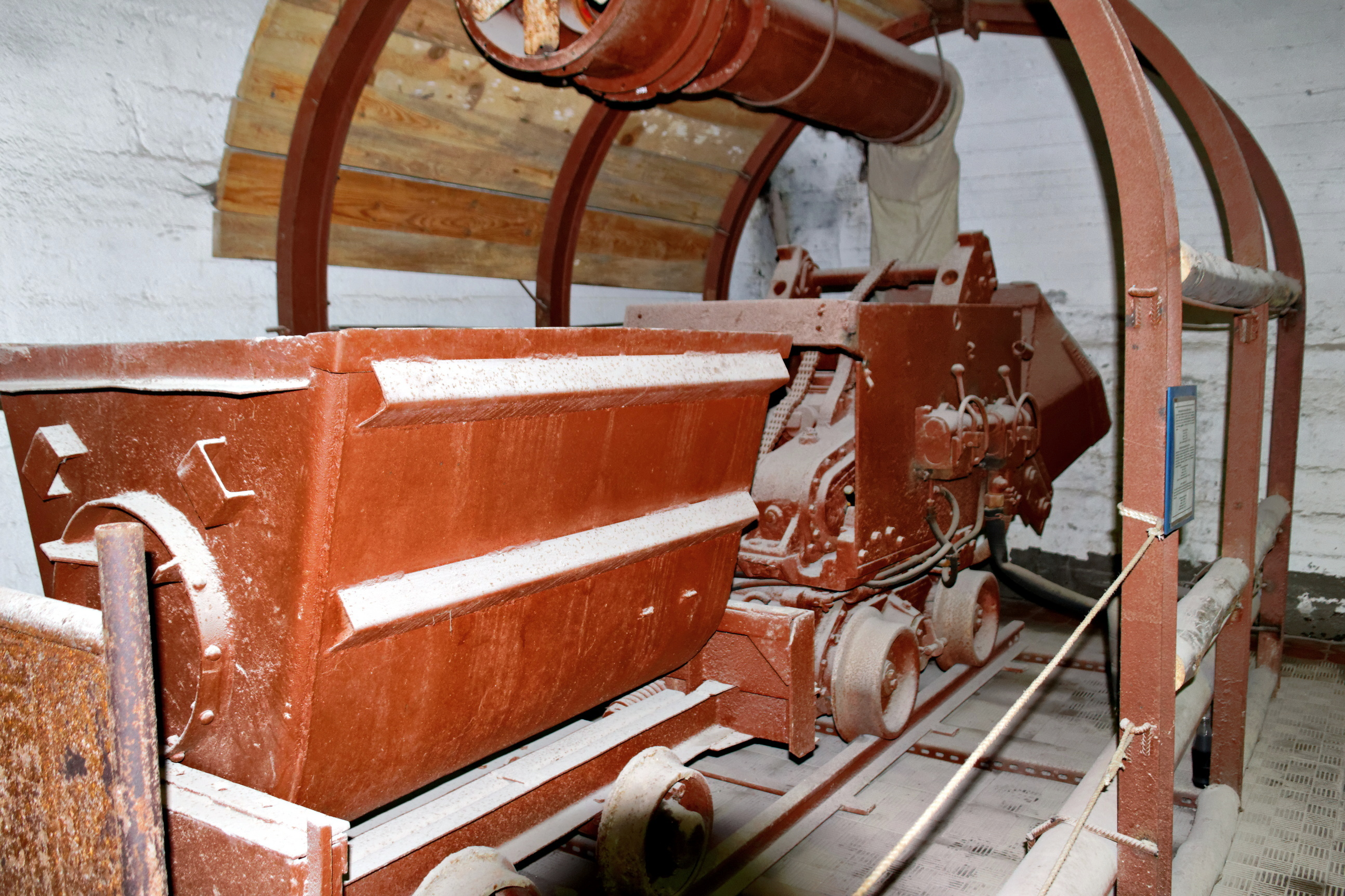
Mine cars, Balaklava Naval Museum

Naval museum complex Balaklava (Ukrainian: Морський музейний комплекс "Балаклава"; Russian: Музей холодной войны, lit. 'The Cold War Museum', designation K-825) is an underground submarine base beneath Mount Tavros in Balaklava, Crimea (originally known as Object 825 GTS). It was a top-secret military facility during the Cold War, located in Balaklava Bay.

Today it serves as a museum and also houses a museum about the Crimean War.

== Description and purpose ==
The complex is built accordingly to withstand a category-I (nuclear yield of 100kt) nuclear explosion, and includes an underground network of water channels complete with a dry dock, repair shops, warehouses for torpedoes and other weapons. Additionally, it could protect personnel from nuclear fallout. The complex is located in the mountain of Tavros, on both sides of which are exits. Caisson gates could be used if necessary to seal the entire complex. An exit to the open sea is provided on the northern side of the mountain. The holes in the rock are neatly covered with camouflage devices and networks.

Object 825 GTS was intended to house, repair and maintain Project 613 and 633 (known as Whiskey and Romeo-class respectively) submarines. The central water channel of the facility, at a length of 602 metres (1,975 ft), could accommodate up to 7 submarines if necessary, and up to 14 submarines of different classes in all water channels. The water channels have depths up to 8 metres (26 ft), with widths ranging from 12 to 22 metres (39 to 72 ft). The total area of all facilities in the complex is around 9,600 square metres (103,000 ft^{2}), while the total surface area of water stands at 5,200 square metres (56,000 ft^{2}). Equipment loading in peacetime was carried out on the pier, then conducted while watching out for the movements of spy satellites of possible military adversaries. A special tunnel is used for loading equipment into the base in wartime. The complex also includes a repair and technical base, code-named Object 280, designed for storing and maintaining a nuclear arsenal. Submarines could enter and exit the base completely submerged through its underwater access point. Temperature inside the base is kept around 15 °C (59 °F).

The Soviet Navy trained dolphins at this facility to attach underwater beacons and explosives to submarines and ships.

== History ==
In the period after the Second World War, the two superpowers, the USSR and the US, stepped up their nuclear arsenal, threatening each other with pre-emptive strikes and retaliatory strikes. It was then when Joseph Stalin gave Lavrentiy Beria (who was responsible at that time for nuclear projects), a secret directive; to find a place where they could house submarines for a retaliatory nuclear strike. Several years of research pinpointed the quiet Balaklava as the location, and the city was immediately coded and got merged into the city of Sevastopol as a city district. Balaklava sits on a narrow winding inlet with a width of only 200–400 meters. This small inlet protects the city not only from storms, but also from reconnaissance as it is not visible from any angle from the open sea. Additionally, the site is close to Sevastopol, a major naval base still used by the Russian Navy's Black Sea Fleet today.

In 1957 a special construction department coded as No. 528 was created, which handled the construction of underground facilities. The construction of the underground complex lasted eight years, from 1953 to 1961. About 120 thousand tons of rock were removed from the Tavros mountain throughout the process. To ensure secrecy, supplies were transported at night on a barge in the open sea. After the complex was closed in 1993, most of the complex is unguarded. The abandoned facility was handed over to the naval forces of the Armed Forces of Ukraine in 2000.

However, the former base was frequently plundered during the unguarded period from 1993 to 2003, with all metal structures scavenged for the metal.

The Sevastopol "Marine Commission" led by Vladimir Stefanovsky proposed the construction of the current museum. The museum would have themed exhibition halls, which were former repair shops and arsenals, a submarine standing by the underground pier, a tourist center, a cinema room with a chronicle of the time of active military confrontation between the two superpowers, and finally, an underground memorial dedicated to submariners who died at sea.

The 10th anniversary of the museum was celebrated in June 2013. Submarine veterans, former employees of the base as well as representatives from the authorities, armed forces and students attended the ceremony.

The facility was placed under the jurisdiction of Russia and the southern area of the Military History Museum of fortification structures of the Russian Federation in 2014, after the annexation of Crimea.

The 2012 American action film, Soldiers of Fortune, filmed parts of it near the base.

In 2021, the Russian Navy towed the former Soviet Romeo-class submarine, S-49 into the complex to serve as a museum ship.

On 4 December 2024, Story Television aired an episode called "Cities of the Underworld: Secret Soviet Bases" on their show World Events on Wednesday.

== Restoration ==
According to press information from March 2014, Russia is considering the possibility of restoring the submarine base in Balaklava.

== Address ==
The base sits at No.22 Tavricheskaya Naberezhnaya street, Balaklava district, Sevastopol, Crimea.

== Similar bases ==
- The underground Muskö Naval Base in Muskö, Sweden, designed for deployment of missile boats and small destroyers.
- Fallout shelters and repair shops in the Bay of Pavlovsk.
- Fallout shelter and submarine repair shops in Vidyaevo.
- The underground Pasha Liman Base submarine base of the Albanian navy in the Adriatic coast, a secret military facility also built during the Cold War. This base was formerly used for basing Soviet submarines, but later went under the control of NATO in 2009.

== See also ==
- Muskö Naval Base
- Olavsvern, Norway
