= American Psycho (film) =

2000 film by Mary Harron

- Theatrical release poster
- Directed by: Mary Harron
- Screenplay by: Mary Harron; Guinevere Turner
- Based on: American Psycho by Bret Easton Ellis
- Produced by: Edward R. Pressman; Chris Hanley; Christian Halsey Solomon
- Starring: Christian Bale; Willem Dafoe; Jared Leto; Josh Lucas; Samantha Mathis; Matt Ross; Bill Sage; Chloë Sevigny; Cara Seymour; Justin Theroux; Guinevere Turner; Reese Witherspoon
- Cinematography: Andrzej Sekuła
- Edited by: Andrew Marcus
- Music by: John Cale
- Production companies: Edward R. Pressman Productions; Muse Productions
- Distributed by: Lions Gate Films
- Release dates: January 21, 2000 (Sundance); April 14, 2000 (United States and Canada)
- Running time: 102 minutes
- Countries: United States; Canada
- Language: English
- Budget: $7 million
- Box office: $34.2 million

American Psycho is a 2000 horror comedy film directed by Mary Harron who co-wrote the screenplay with Guinevere Turner. Based on the 1991 novel by Bret Easton Ellis, it stars Christian Bale as Patrick Bateman, a wealthy New York City investment banker who leads a double life as a serial killer. Willem Dafoe, Jared Leto, Josh Lucas, Chloë Sevigny, Samantha Mathis, Cara Seymour, Justin Theroux, Turner, and Reese Witherspoon appear in supporting roles. The film blends psychological horror and black comedy to satirize 1980s yuppie culture and consumerism, exemplified by Bateman.

Ellis considered his novel unfilmable; however, producer Edward R. Pressman was determined to adapt it and bought the film rights in 1992. Stuart Gordon, David Cronenberg, and Rob Weiss considered directing the film before Harron and Turner began writing the screenplay in 1996. They sought to make a 1980s period film that emphasized the novel's satire. The pre-production period was tumultuous; Harron chose Bale to play Bateman, but because distributor Lions Gate Films sought Leonardo DiCaprio in the role, Harron was fired and replaced with Oliver Stone. After DiCaprio and Stone left due to creative differences, Harron was rehired and allowed to cast Bale. Principal photography began in February 1999 in Toronto and New York City.

American Psycho premiered at the Sundance Film Festival on January 21, 2000, and was released theatrically in the United States on April 14. The film received mostly positive reviews, with praise for Bale's performance and the screenplay, and grossed $34 million on a $7 million budget. It has since developed a cult following and a strong presence in meme culture since the 2010s. By December 2024, a new adaptation of the novel, directed by Luca Guadagnino, was in the works.

== Plot ==
In 1987, New York City investment banker Patrick Bateman meticulously maintains a polished social façade while harboring violent impulses. He dines at trendy restaurants, obsesses over his physical appearance, and navigates a shallow circle of wealthy associates he secretly despises, all while engaged to Evelyn Williams. During a business meeting, he and his colleagues flaunt their business cards respective designs. Bateman is enraged by the perceived superiority of his colleague Paul Allen's card. Later, he encounters a homeless man and his dog in an alley; initially offering help, Bateman instead insults and brutally kills them.

Bateman's envy intensifies over Allen's more affluent successful lifestyle, able to easily secure reservations at Dorsia, an elite restaurant Bateman cannot access. At a Christmas party, he arranges dinner with Allen, who mistakes him for another co-worker, Marcus Halberstram. During the dinner, Allen's condescending attitude fuels Bateman's resentment. Bateman gets him drunk, lures him to his apartment, and murders him with an axe. He disposes of the body and uses Allen's keys to access his apartment, leaving a message on Allen's answering machine claiming he has gone to London. When private investigator Donald Kimball questions Bateman about Allen's disappearance, mentioning sightings of Allen in London, Bateman deflects suspicion.

Bateman hires prostitutes Christie and Sabrina, engaging in sadistic acts before paying them to leave. His violence nearly arouses colleague Luis Carruthers when he attempts to strangle him in a restaurant restroom, but Carruthers misinterprets the act as a sexual advance, horrifying Bateman, who flees. Kimball's second interview heightens Bateman's paranoia, but he continues his spree, seducing a model and later toying with killing his secretary, Jean. At his apartment, Jean narrowly escapes harm after Bateman warns her that he might lose control, unaware of the model's severed head in his refrigerator.

Kimball later informs Bateman that a colleague claims to have dined with Allen on the night of his disappearance, solidifying Bateman's alibi. Kimball dismisses the idea of Allen's murder as implausible, leaving Bateman relieved yet unnerved. Bateman rehires Christie and invites acquaintance Elizabeth for a drug-fueled encounter that turns deadly. Christie discovers corpses in his apartment while fleeing, only to be killed when Bateman drops a chainsaw on her in a stairwell.

Bateman unravels after breaking off his engagement with Evelyn. An ATM bizarrely displays "Feed me a stray cat", prompting him to nearly kill the kitten that had appeared, but he shoots a woman who intervenes instead. Fleeing from police, he shoots an officer, inexplicably blows up a patrol car, and kills more innocents before hiding in his office building. In a frantic voicemail to his lawyer, Harold Carnes, Bateman confesses to around 40 murders, including Allen, Christie, Elizabeth, and others.

The next day, Bateman visits Allen's apartment, now vacant and for sale. A realtor, suspicious of his dust mask, denies the apartment's connection to Allen and urges him to leave. Jean, alarmed by Bateman's disturbed state, finds his journal filled with graphic sketches of murder. At lunch, Carnes mistakes Bateman for someone else, laughs off the confession, and claims he recently dined with Allen in London, undermining Bateman's reality. As his friends discuss dinner reservations and muse about Ronald Reagan's persona, Bateman, uncertain if his crimes were real or imagined, narrates his unrelenting pain and desire to inflict it on others. Recognizing that his punishment and liberation from a hollow existence will never come, he declares his confession meaningless.

== Cast ==
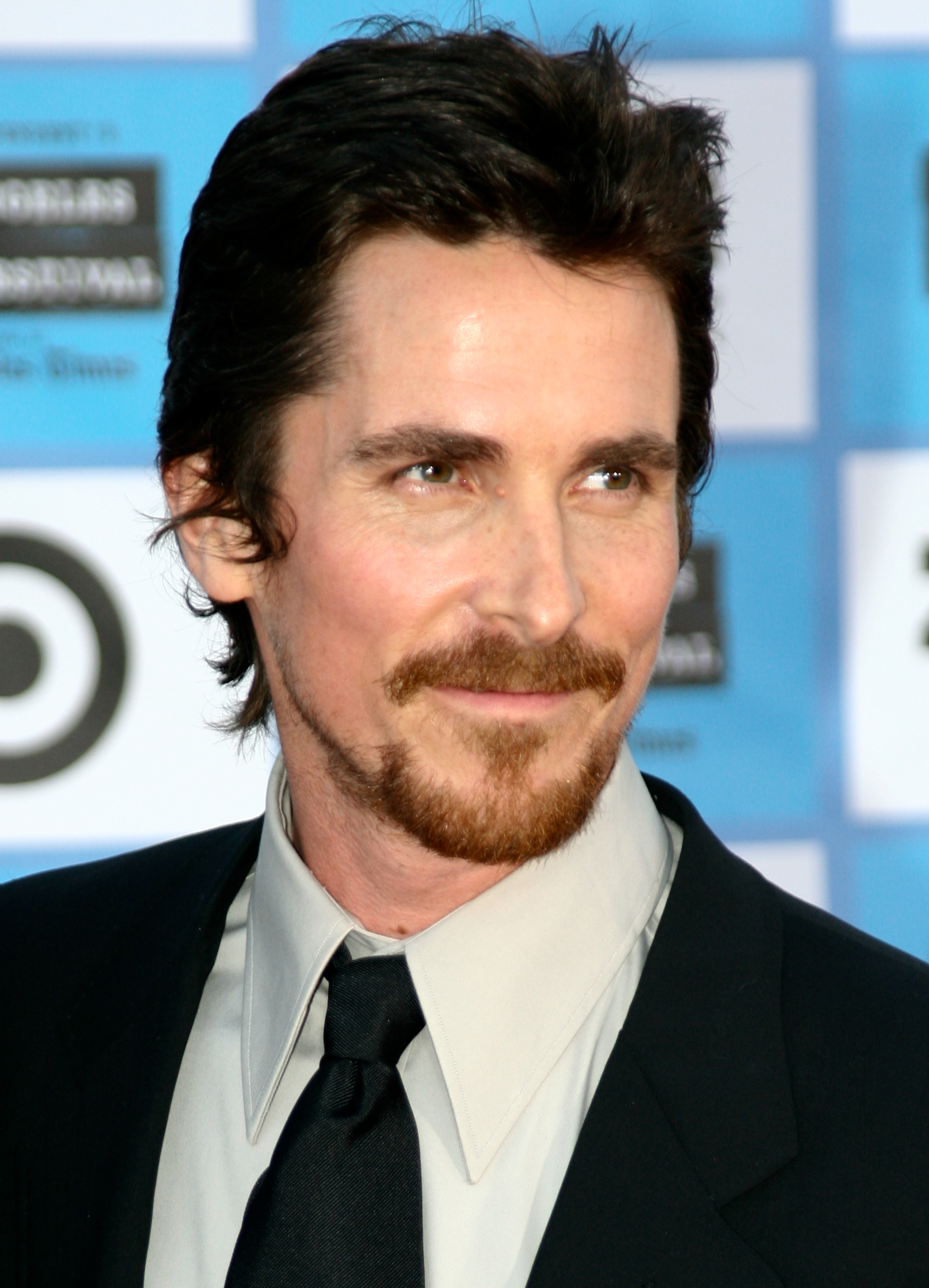
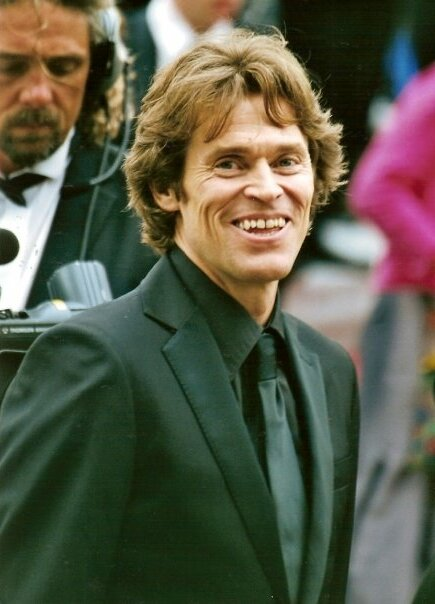
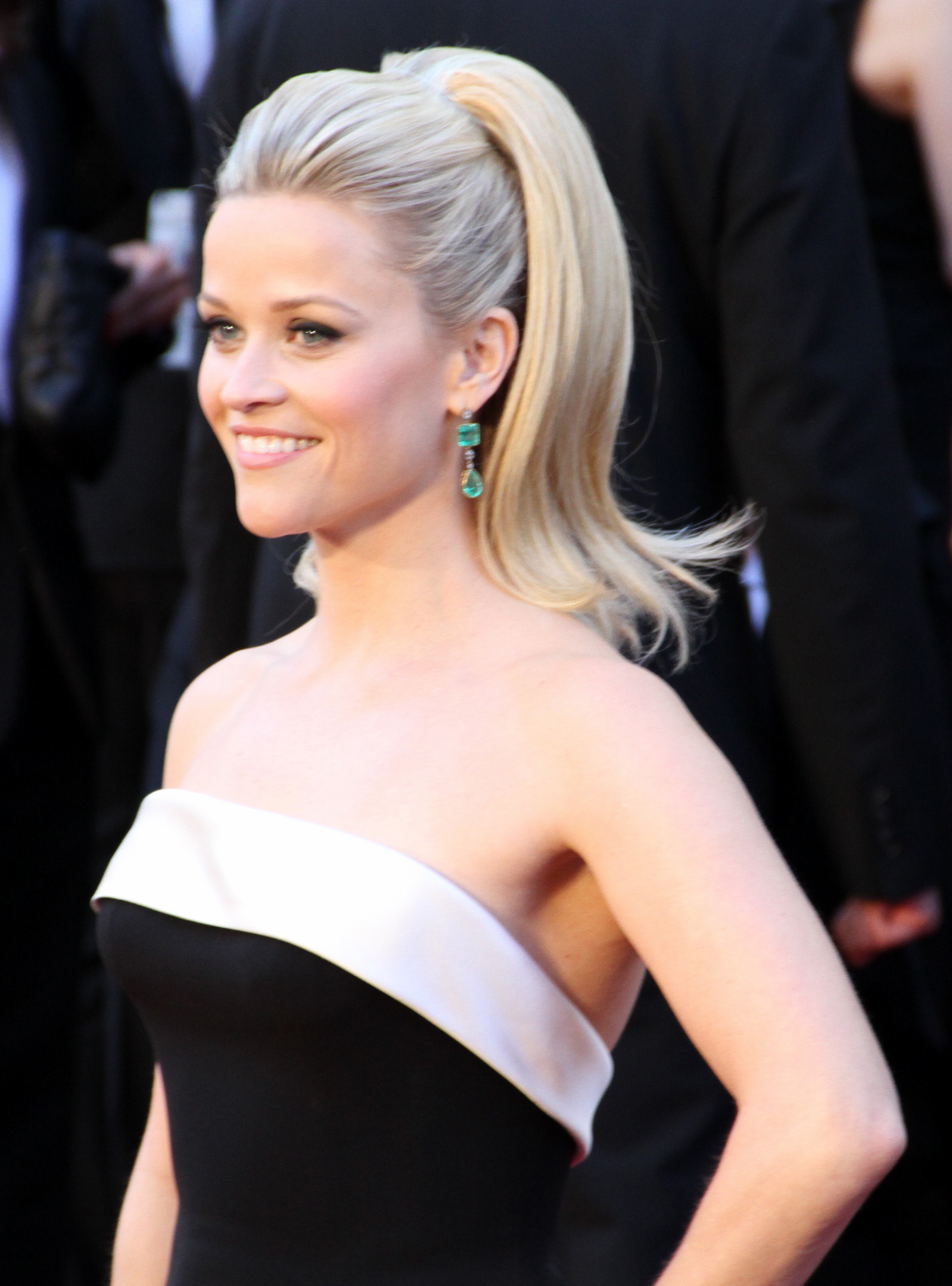
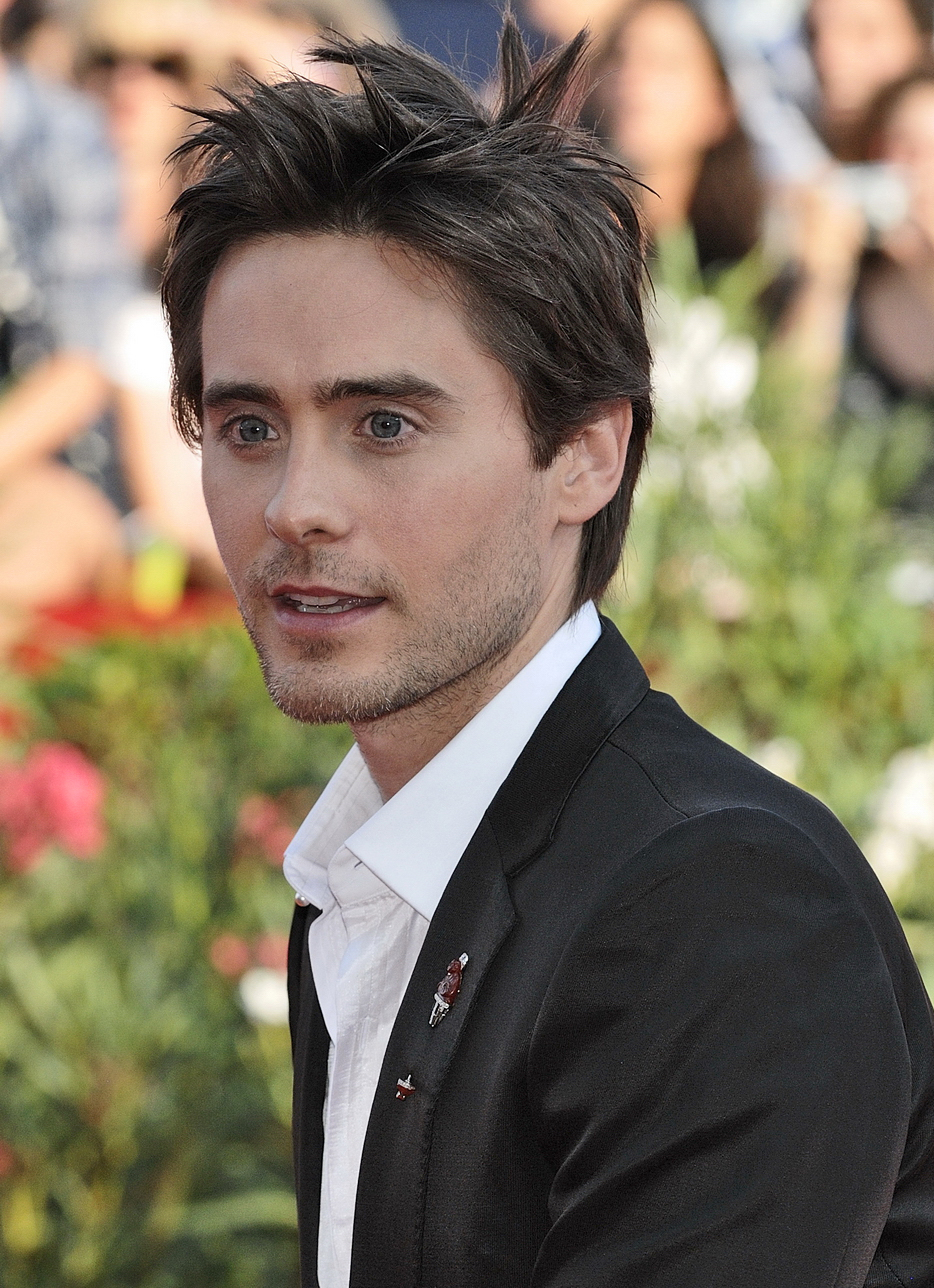
(Left to right) Christian Bale (2009), Willem Dafoe (2005), Reese Witherspoon (2011) and Jared Leto (2009)
- Christian Bale as Patrick Bateman, a New York City investment banker who leads a double life as a serial killer
- Justin Theroux as Timothy Bryce, a colleague of Bateman
- Josh Lucas as Craig McDermott, a colleague of Bateman
- Bill Sage as David Van Patten, a colleague of Bateman
- Chloë Sevigny as Jean, Bateman's secretary
- Reese Witherspoon as Evelyn Williams, Bateman's fiancée whom he despises
- Samantha Mathis as Courtney Rawlinson, Luis Carruthers' fiancée who is having an affair with Bateman
- Matt Ross as Luis Carruthers, a colleague of Bateman and closeted homosexual
- Jared Leto as Paul Allen, a fellow investment banker whom Bateman kills
- Willem Dafoe as Donald Kimball, a private investigator who investigates the disappearance of Paul Allen
- Cara Seymour as Christie, a prostitute
- Guinevere Turner as Elizabeth, a woman whom Bateman kills

Other cast members include Stephen Bogaert as Harold Carnes, Bateman's lawyer; Reg E. Cathey as Al, a homeless man; Krista Sutton as Sabrina, a sex worker; Catherine Black as Vanden, Williams' cousin; Patricia Gage as Mrs. Wolfe, a real estate agent; and Anthony Lemke as Marcus Halberstram, Bateman's colleague with whom he shares a passing resemblance. Former U.S. president Ronald Reagan appears in archive footage of his 1987 address concerning the Iran–Contra affair.

== Production ==
=== Early development ===
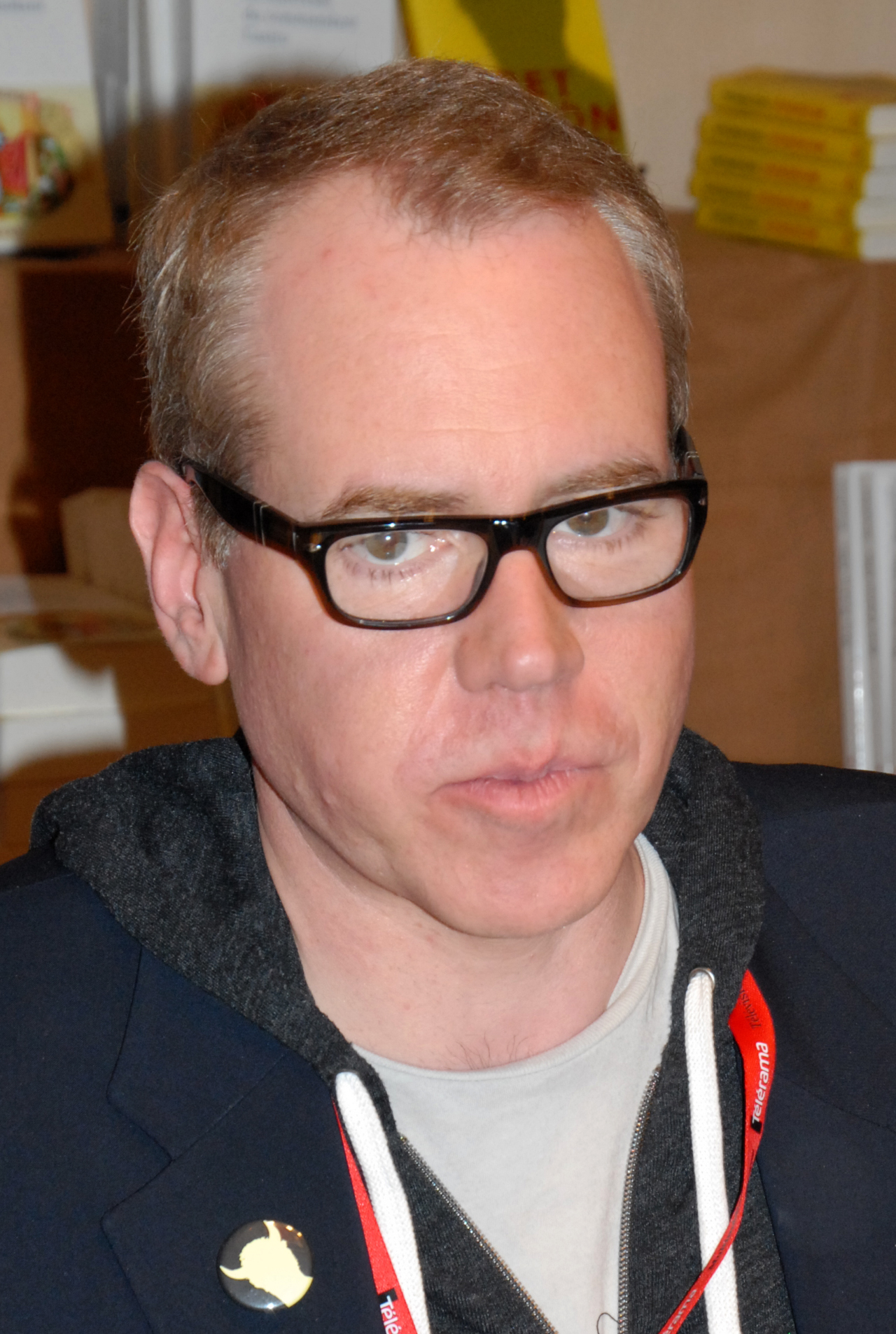
Bret Easton Ellis, who wrote the American Psycho novel and early drafts of the adaptation, in 2010.

The film is an adaptation of the novel American Psycho by Bret Easton Ellis, which was published in 1991 amid significant controversy over its graphic depiction of violence against women. Ellis had been disappointed by the 1987 film adaptation of his first novel, Less than Zero (1985), and did not expect that anyone would be interested in adapting American Psycho, which he considered possibly unfilmable. Nonetheless, development of a film adaptation began in 1992, after Johnny Depp expressed interest and producer Edward R. Pressman bought the film rights. Pressman, to Ellis' surprise, was "obsessed" with turning American Psycho into a film. Ellis discussed the project with filmmaker Stuart Gordon but felt that he was unsuitable.

David Cronenberg and Brad Pitt respectively became attached to direct and star, and Ellis was brought on to write the screenplay. The process was difficult for Ellis; Cronenberg did not want to use any of the restaurant or nightclub material from the novel (which he considered boring), wanted to excise the violence, and mandated that the script be 65–70 pages. Ellis considered Cronenberg's directions "insane" and ignored them. Ellis' draft departed significantly from the novel, as he had "been living with it for, like, three and a half years, four years" and had grown bored with it. It ended with an elaborate musical sequence to Barry Manilow's "Daybreak" atop the World Trade Center, a change which Ellis felt exemplified how fatigued he was with the material.

The development was prolonged due to what Variety called American Psycho's "literary complexity", which made adapting it to film difficult. Cronenberg was dissatisfied with Ellis' draft and by March 1994 had sought a new draft from Norman Snider; Ellis later recalled that Cronenberg left the project after he disliked Snider's draft even more. Ellis wrote another draft for Rob Weiss in 1995, but the film again failed to materialize. Pressman did not want to make a film that would offend people and described Ellis' draft as "completely pornographic". Pressman appeared at the 1996 Cannes Film Festival to pre-sell the distribution rights to no avail.

=== Development under Mary Harron ===
After Mary Harron's film I Shot Andy Warhol premiered at the 49th Cannes Film Festival to positive reviews in January 1996, she received a call from Roberta Hanley—who operated the production company which held the American Psycho film rights—with an offer to direct the film. Harron had attempted to read the novel when it was originally published but found it too violent. However, rereading it, she realized that "just enough time ha[d] passed" to produce a period film set in the 1980s, "bring out the satire", and comment on the era, which interested her. Harron was ambivalent towards the other "very mainstream and boring" offers she was receiving following I Shot Andy Warhol and decided to make American Psycho due to its "risky" nature.

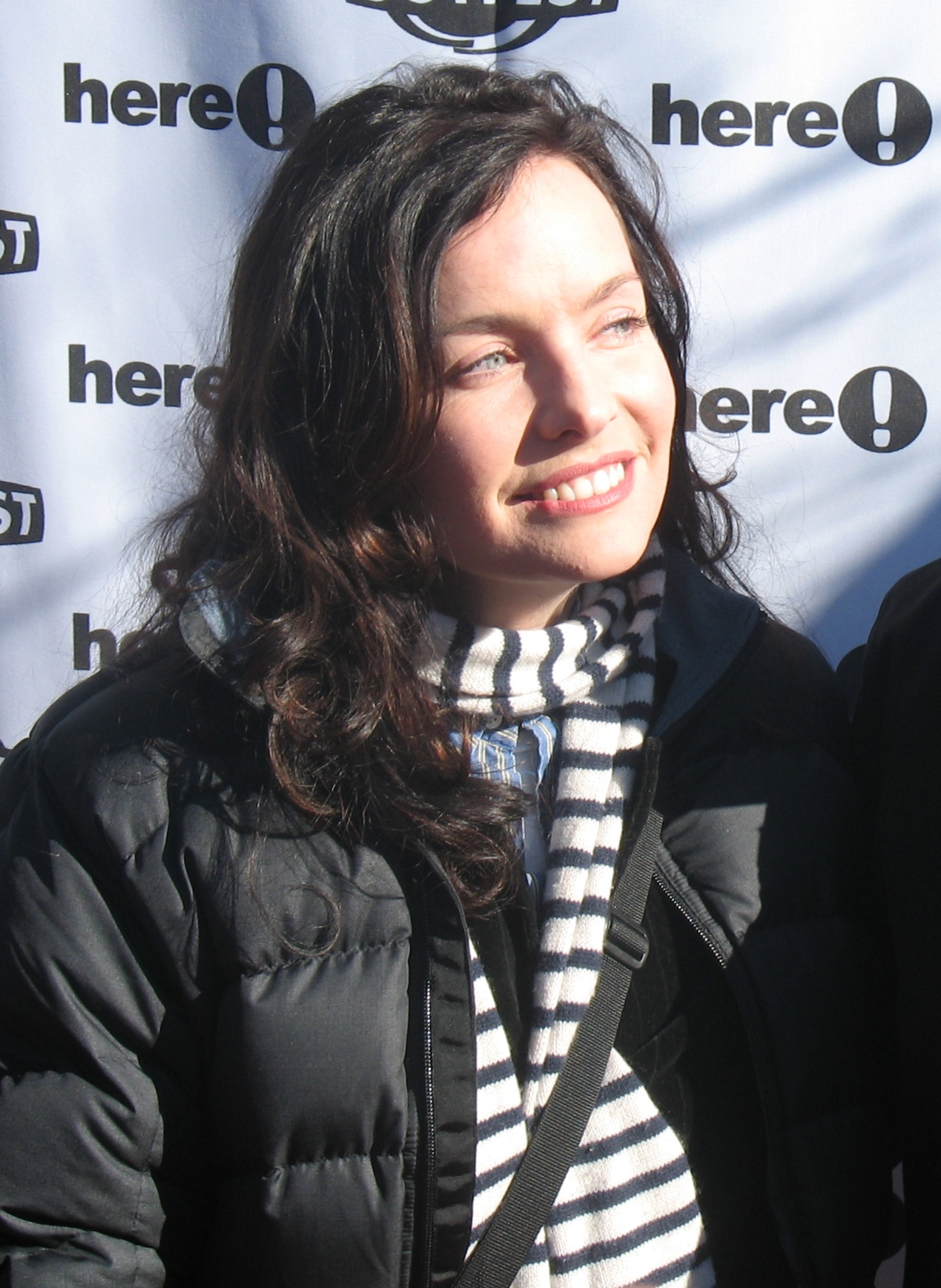
Co-writer Guinevere Turner in 2006.

Harron read the existing drafts; while she somewhat enjoyed Ellis', she felt that most were too moralistic, missing the novel's preciseness in depicting social privilege. Harron told Pressman that she would only join the project if she could write her own screenplay. Pressman commented that out of all the directors who attached themselves to American Psycho, Harron was "the only person who actually ever conveyed a clear solution as to how to do it". Harron recruited Guinevere Turner, with whom she had been working on what would become The Notorious Bettie Page (2005), to co-write. Turner was not a horror fan and had never heard of American Psycho, but Harron convinced her that it would be a good project to pursue. Though she found the novel unsavory, Turner appreciated its blend of humor and horror and concluded that "with the right spin it could be a really subversive, feminist movie".

Harron and Turner excised most of the novel's violence outside four sequences of Bateman's murders. Their approach to the material and Bateman's character was influenced by Mario Bava's giallo film Hatchet for the Honeymoon (1970), with Bava historian Tim Lucas noting that both films feature protagonists motivated by a desire for self-discovery in their killings. Harron recalled facing scrutiny for depicting Bateman as homophobic—a criticism she found odd since no objections were raised over his murders. She also received requests to delve into Bateman's psychology but said that "having a very clear psychological explanation [wasn't] of great interest to me" since she found the concept generic, shallow, and unrealistic. Harron rejected suggestions to explore Bateman's family and background; she felt it was unnecessary and that Bateman was simply "a monster".

Harron met with several actors for the role of Patrick Bateman but struggled to find a suitable candidate. She noted that "if someone isn't 100 percent on a role like [Bateman], you can't cast them and they shouldn't do it". Billy Crudup was attached to the role for a month and a half, but was uneasy and left the project. Turner appreciated Crudup's honesty in admitting he could not understand the character. Harron sent the script to Christian Bale, but he had never read American Psycho and thus had no interest. Harron contacted Christine Vachon, who was working with Bale on Velvet Goldmine (1998) at the time, and Vachon told him to read the script. Bale found the script humorous and immediately became interested, and flew to New York to audition in Harron's living room.

Bale struggled to speak in an American accent since he had been speaking in a Manchester accent for Velvet Goldmine, but Harron thought it was clear he understood the role. Like Harron, Bale was uninterested in Bateman's backstory; he saw the character as "an alien who landed in the unabashedly capitalist New York of the '80s". Harron felt he was the only one who fit the role, later saying he "saw the part the way that I did, and he got the humor of it". When auditioning others she "had the feeling a lot of the other actors kind of thought Bateman was cool". Bale, she said, did not. Harron thought casting the relatively unknown Bale was risky, but "had a lot of faith in him", as Velvet Goldmine director Todd Haynes told her that Bale was "the best actor I've ever worked with". Harron and Bale, in-character as Bateman, met with Ellis for dinner, an experience Ellis told Bale later into the evening was "unnerving [him]".

=== Pre-production and casting ===
Lionsgate Films acquired the American Psycho distribution rights in May 1998 and set a budget of $10 million. Bale, Willem Dafoe and Jared Leto expressed interest and were in talks, although no actors were signed on then. Production was planned to start in August. Harron suggested that the slim Bale go to a gym since Bateman frequently exercises; she said that within two weeks, Bale had "totally transformed". Turner said Bale "became completely ripped, super tan, got his teeth turned into perfect American teeth. I think he said he was modeling himself after his lawyer, or his agent, or Tom Cruise — an amalgam of those". Harron recalled that Bale drew inspiration for his performance from a televised Tom Cruise interview: "I saw Tom Cruise on a talk show last night, and there was something about that friendliness, with almost nothing behind the eyes." Bale received numerous warnings that starring in American Psycho was "career suicide", but this only made him more committed.

Bale was relatively unknown at the time; he had been only 13 at the time of his then-most famous role, in Steven Spielberg's Empire of the Sun (1987). Lionsgate did not want to cast him and pushed for a more famous star like Edward Norton or Leonardo DiCaprio, who Lionsgate was willing to pay $20 million, although the budget for the film itself would remain only $6 million. DiCaprio was considered the biggest star in the world at the time, having just starred in Titanic (1997), then the highest-grossing film ever. DiCaprio was interested in playing Bateman, but Harron opposed casting him, comparing the prospect to Demi Moore's casting in the critically panned 1995 film Scarlet Letter. She argued he was too boyish to play Bateman and that his presence would harm the film given his young female fanbase. Harron refused to even consider meeting with him, despite Pressman's pleas. Ellis did not mind the idea of DiCaprio as Bateman, though he knew this annoyed Bale and Harron.

At the 51st Cannes Film Festival in May 1998, Lionsgate suddenly announced that DiCaprio had been cast as Bateman. Though Pressman wanted Harron to stay, she was fired after making it clear that she would not direct American Psycho without Bale. Furthermore, DiCaprio wanted to work with a major director and had drafted a shortlist that included Danny Boyle, Jonathan Demme, Stanley Kubrick, and Martin Scorsese. Oliver Stone was hired to direct and, after a reading with DiCaprio, Leto, and Cameron Diaz, began reworking the script. Stone and DiCaprio wanted to take the film in a more psychological direction in contrast to Harron's satire and turn it into a Jekyll and Hyde-like story. Their endeavor was beset by creative differences; Pressman said, "[DiCaprio] was looking for solutions to things that weren't problems. . . .As time went on more and more questions came into Leo's mind — which might have been about the script or other factors". Bale was so confident DiCaprio would depart that he turned down other roles for nine months and continued preparing.

DiCaprio departed in favor of Boyle's The Beach (2000), which led to Stone's withdrawal. Turner later said she heard from a friend that DiCaprio chose to leave after Gloria Steinem, a strong critic of the novel, convinced him to abandon the project due to his young fanbase. Lionsgate rehired Harron but was still against casting Bale as Bateman. Lionsgate offered the role to Ewan McGregor, who turned it down after Bale personally urged him to do so. Harron spoke with Ben Affleck, Matt Damon, Edward Norton, and Vince Vaughn, but after they all declined, Lionsgate begrudgingly agreed to hire Bale with a small $50,000 salary. Lionsgate also mandated that the budget not exceed $10 million and that recognizable actors would fill the supporting roles. By that point, Dafoe, Leto, Reese Witherspoon, and Chloë Sevigny were already committed; Harron and Bale unsuccessfully tried to convince Winona Ryder to play Evelyn Williams.

=== Filming ===
Principal photography commenced in February 1999, and lasted seven weeks, with a budget of $7 million. Andrzej Sekuła served as cinematographer; he and Harron frequently argued, with Ross recalling that "[Sekuła] was setting up shots that in [Harron]'s mind may have been cool shots, pretty shots, but didn't tell the story she wanted to". As American companies did not want to be associated with American Psycho, the production team had to turn to European companies for clothes and cosmetics, though these still imposed restrictions. Rolex made Harron change the novel's line "don't touch the Rolex" to "don't touch the watch", while Cerruti 1881 disallowed Bale from wearing its clothes during the murder scenes.

Though some outdoor shots were captured in New York City, where the film is set, the majority of filming took place in downtown Toronto, including the Toronto-Dominion Centre, where Bateman's office is located, and a variety of scenes shot in bars and restaurants around the city. Anti-violence advocates petitioned Toronto City Hall to deny the production permission to film in Toronto and organized protests because of reports that Paul Bernardo—who committed serial murders and rapes in Toronto—owned a copy of the novel. (Note: The claim that Bernardo was inspired by American Psycho is false. His crime spree began in 1987, several years before American Psycho's publication. Additionally, author Stephen Williams wrote in Invisible Darkness, a book about the Bernardo case, that Bernardo was nearly illiterate and the copy of American Psycho in his house belonged to his wife Karla Homolka; he is unlikely to have ever read it.) As a result, the production faced difficulty securing shooting locations; the scenes in Bateman's office had to be filmed on a sound stage because the owners of the building that Harron intended to film in feared negative publicity. Harron had been unaware of the novel's connection to the Bernardo case and sympathized with the protesters, but reasoned that she did not "want to put horrible mayhem on the screen... there's something to do here that hasn't really been done, a portrait of the late 80's that's worth putting on the screen". To avoid protests, the production removed the film's title from daily call sheets and parking permits.

Bale brought his copy of the novel to the set every day. Harron remained faithful to the novel's dialogue, so he "would kind of be skimming through it and looking at it and finding little bits and conferring in the corner with [her]". Harron stated Bale drew inspiration from Nicolas Cage's performance in Vampire's Kiss (1989) and Tom Cruise in an interview on Late Night with David Letterman. He kept images of 1980s figures who he felt Bateman would attempt to emulate, such as Cruise and Donald Trump, in his trailer. A method actor, Bale never broke character during the shoot—he did not socialize off-camera, always spoke with an American accent, and worked out at a gym for hours to maintain Bateman's physique. His behavior confused other actors, with Sevigny saying that she had never seen an actor commit to a role to such a degree. Josh Lucas later told Bale that the other actors "thought that [he] was the worst actor they'd ever seen" and did not understand why Harron fought for him. Harron nicknamed Bale "Robo-Actor" for his ability to control his sweat glands, which she and his co-stars noticed during the business card scene.

An example of his emotional resonance, Bateman delivers an analytical monologue about Huey Lewis and the News while preparing to murder coworker Paul Allen, showcasing his detachment from humanity and the film's juxtaposition of charm and violence.

Harron and Bale excluded Leto from rehearsals of the murder of Paul Allen so Leto's expression of shock when Bale ran at him with an axe would be genuine. The shots of Bateman swinging his axe at Allen had to be done quickly since the scene's use of theatrical blood limited the number of takes. Bale swung at a Plexiglass-coated camera as the crew squirted fake blood at his face. The blood covered only half of Bale's face by accident but Harron found this "a perfect metaphor for the Jekyll-and-Hyde aspect of Bateman: pristine on the outside, bloody and psychotic on the inside". Bale improvised Bateman's moonwalk, a change from the novel that Ellis initially disliked, but grew to appreciate over time. For the subsequent interview scenes featuring Donald Kimball, Harron shot three takes and requested that Dafoe act differently in each of them. Dafoe acted as if Kimball knew Bateman was Allen's killer in the first, only suspected him in the second, and did not suspect anything in the third. The three takes were then blended in montage to create uncertainty regarding the character's intentions.

Harron and Turner kept most violence off-screen, but Harron wanted "one classic horror movie scary scene" with "a big explosion of violence" that embraced the novel's brutality. They conceived a threesome with Bateman and two women that ends with him murdering them. Bale had no problem appearing nude, though he wore sneakers and covered his penis with a sock. One of the women was portrayed by Turner, who found it "very daunting" being directed by Harron, despite having been her co-writer for years. The shot in which Bateman murders Turner's character while having sex with her took several takes, as it was difficult to get the theatrical blood to ooze through the sheets as they intended. Bateman's phone confession took around 15 takes because Harron felt Bale's acting got better as he became more flushed. In contrast, a shot in which Bateman peels off a facial mask took only one take.

=== Music ===
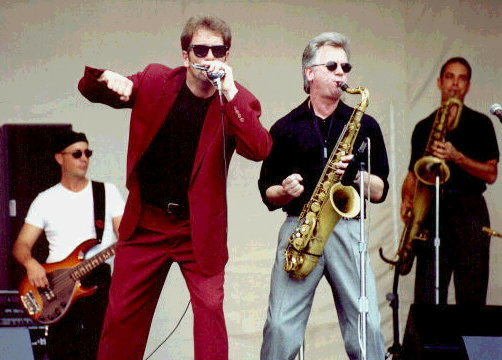
The Huey Lewis and the News (pictured) song "Hip to Be Square" appears in the film.

American Psycho's soundtrack features licensed 1980s pop music from a variety of artists, including David Bowie, Phil Collins, the Cure, the Mediæval Bæbes, New Order, Robert Palmer and Eric B. & Rakim. Due to the film's controversial nature, obtaining the rights proved difficult. Though the production was able to obtain the rights to all necessary songs, Whitney Houston refused to allow the use of her performance of "The Greatest Love of All", so an orchestral arrangement had to be used instead. The Huey Lewis and the News song "Hip to Be Square" appears in the film and was intended to be on the soundtrack album, but was removed, forcing Koch Records to recall approximately 100,000 copies. Koch Records president Bob Frank said that the removal was due to Huey Lewis objecting to the film's violence, but in 2013, Lewis said Frank's story was "completely made up". Lewis's manager Bob Brown said that "Hip to Be Square" was included on the album without their permission, which he speculated was a publicity stunt.

The original score was composed by Welsh musician and Velvet Underground co-founder John Cale, who also scored I Shot Andy Warhol, alongside M.J. Mynarski. Cale joined because, like I Shot Andy Warhol, he found Harron's script intelligent. He composed in his studio using a sampler and sent the music file to someone who turned it into a composition and hired musicians to record it. Harron described Cale's work as "a soulful, even melancholy sound to complement the soundtrack's poppy brightness". Cale was uninvolved with the selection of licensed music and sound mixing, though, for one scene that Harron wanted to be unsettling, he suggested using animal noises, like the tapes of rabbits screaming that the Federal Bureau of Investigation used against the Branch Davidians during the Waco siege. The soundtrack album was released on April 4, 2000.

== Release ==
As a promotion, one could register to receive e-mails "from" Patrick Bateman, supposedly to his therapist. The e-mails, written by a writer attached to the film and approved by Bret Easton Ellis, follow Bateman's life since the events of the film. He discusses such developments as his marriage to (and impending divorce settlement with) his former secretary, Jean, his complete adoration of his son, Patrick Jr., and his efforts to triumph over his business rivals. The e-mails also describe or mention interactions with other characters from the novel, including Timothy Price (Bryce in the film version), Evelyn, Luis, Courtney, David, Detective Kimball, and Marcus. However, Bale was not happy with this kind of marketing: "My main objection is that some people think it will be me returning those e-mails. I don't like that ... I think the movie stands on its own merits and should attract an audience that can appreciate intelligent satire. It's not a slasher flick, but it's also not American Pie. The marketing should reflect that".

Lionsgate partnered with the Hollywood Stock Exchange, an online game in which players can invest in films, actors, or musicians using fake Hollywood money, for a $51,000 promotion titled Make a Killing with American Psycho, which invited players to buy 5000 shares of the film using the game's virtual currency, with real money being paid out if the film grossed over $20 million in four weeks. This marketing ploy did little to help the film's box office but the studio's co-president Tom Ortenberg still claimed that it was a success: "The aim was to gain exposure and awareness for the picture, and we did that. Lionsgate will make a tidy profit on the picture".

American Psycho premiered at the 2000 Sundance Film Festival. The Motion Picture Association of America (MPAA) initially gave the film an NC-17 rating for a scene featuring Bateman having a threesome with two prostitutes. The producers excised approximately 18 seconds of footage to obtain an R-rated version of the film. Marketing the film proved unusually challenging, as distributors were uncertain how audiences would interpret the mixture of violence and satire. The promotional campaign ultimately focused on the film's critique of 1980s excess rather than its more graphic elements. Early festival screenings produced divided reactions, with some critics praising the film's bold tonal balance and others questioning whether the satire was too subtle.

=== Box office ===
As of August 14, 2026, American Psycho had grossed $34,270,556 worldwide including $15,070,285 in the United States and Canada, with a domestic opening of $4,961,015. Internationally, it grossed $19,196,279. The film had a total $7 million production budget.

=== Home media ===
A special-edition DVD was released on July 21, 2005. In the U.S., two versions of the film have been released: an R-rated and unrated version. For the edited version and R-rated cinematic release in the U.S., the producers excised about 18 seconds of footage from a scene featuring Bateman having a threesome with two prostitutes. Some dialogue was also edited: Bateman orders a prostitute, Christie, to bend over so that another, Sabrina, can "see your asshole", which was edited to "see your ass". The unedited version also shows Bateman receiving oral sex from Christie. The uncut version was released on Blu-ray on February 6, 2007. A 4K Blu-ray was released with the Uncut Version on September 25, 2018, in US and October 15 in United Kingdom. Sony Pictures Home Entertainment also released the film on Blu-ray around Australia, Spain, Poland, Russia, South Africa, Bulgaria, China, the Czech Republic, Hungary, Portugal, Thailand, and Taiwan in December 2008.

In November 2025, the film had a VHS release by Lionsgate Films, alongside Cabin Fever (2002), and Leprechaun (1993).

== Reception and legacy ==
American Psycho debuted at the Sundance Film Festival, where it polarized audiences and critics; some praised the film for its writing and performance from Christian Bale, while others criticised its violent nature. Upon its theatrical release, the film received positive reviews in crucial publications, including The New York Times which called it a "mean and lean horror comedy classic". On the review aggregator website Rotten Tomatoes, 69% of 251 critics' reviews are positive. The website's consensus reads: "If it falls short of the deadly satire of Bret Easton Ellis's novel, American Psycho still finds its own blend of horror and humor, thanks in part to a fittingly creepy performance by Christian Bale." Metacritic, which uses a weighted average, assigned the film a score of 64 out of 100, based on 35 critics, indicating "generally favorable" reviews. Audiences polled by CinemaScore gave the film an average grade of "D" on an A+ to F scale.

Roger Ebert gave the film three out of four stars, praising the female perspective brought by Harron and Turner because they depict Bateman not as a psychologically disturbed aberration, but as a certain type of selfish, ego-driven male behavior taken to an extreme. Ebert also described Bale as being "heroic in the way he allows the character to leap joyfully into despicability; there is no instinct for self-preservation here, and that is one mark of a good actor". In his review for the Los Angeles Times, Kenneth Turan wrote: "The difficult truth is that the more viewers can model themselves after protagonist Bateman, the more they can distance themselves from the human reality of the slick violence that fills the screen and take it all as some kind of a cool joke, the more they are likely to enjoy this stillborn, pointless piece of work". Newsweek magazine's David Ansen wrote: "But after an hour of dissecting the '80s culture of materialism, narcissism and greed, the movie begins to repeat itself. It becomes more grisly and surreal, but not more interesting". In his review for The Village Voice, J. Hoberman wrote: "If anything, Bale is too knowing. He eagerly works within the constraints of the quotation marks Harron puts around his performance".

Rolling Stone's Peter Travers compared the film favorably to its source material, noting that Harron "responded to the satiric rather than the slasher elements" of the book, resulting in "an uneven movie that nonetheless bristles with stinging wit and exerts a perverse fascination". In a review for Slate magazine, David Edelstein also noted the toned-down brutality and sexual content in comparison to the novel and wrote that the moment where Bateman spares his secretary is when "this one-dimensional film blossoms like a flower". Owen Gleiberman gave the film an "A−" rating, writing for Entertainment Weekly: "By treating the book as raw material for an exuberantly perverse exercise in '80s Nostalgia, Harron recasts the go-go years as a template for the casually brainwashing-consumer/fashion/image culture that emerged from them. She has made a movie that is really a parable of today". Time magazine's Richard Corliss wrote that "Harron and co-screenwriter Guinevere Turner do understand the book, and they want their film to be understood as a period comedy of manners". A.O. Scott (also from The New York Times) praised the film as well.

Bloody Disgusting ranked the film at No. 19 in its list of the "Top 20 Horror Films of the Decade", with the article praising "Christian Bale's disturbing/darkly hilarious turn as serial killer/Manhattan businessman Patrick Bateman, a role that in hindsight couldn't have been played by any other actor. ... At its best, the film reflects our own narcissism and the shallow American culture it was spawned from, with piercing effectiveness. Much of the credit for this can go to director Mary Harron, whose off-kilter tendencies are a good complement to Ellis's unique style".

Original author Ellis said, "American Psycho was a book I didn't think needed to be turned into a movie", as "the medium of film demands answers", which would make the book "infinitely less interesting". He also said that while the book attempted to add ambiguity to the events and to Bateman's reliability as a narrator, the film appeared to make them completely literal before confusing the issue at the very end. On a 2014 appearance on the WTF with Marc Maron podcast, Ellis indicated that his feelings towards the film were more mixed than negative; he reiterated his opinion that his conception of Bateman as an unreliable narrator did not make an entirely successful transition from page to screen, adding that Bateman's narration was so unreliable that even he, as the author of the book, did not know if Bateman was honestly describing events that actually happened or if he was lying or even hallucinating. Ellis appreciated that the film clarified the humor for audiences who mistook the novel's violence for blatant misogyny as opposed to the deliberately exaggerated satire he had intended, and liked that it gave his novel "a second life" in introducing it to new readers. Ultimately, Ellis said "the movie was okay, the movie was fine. I just didn't think it needed to be made".

Since the mid-2000s, the film has attracted a sizeable cult following, which has grown in the 2010s on various social media platforms. In 2014, WhatCulture included Christian Bale's role in top "10 Most Convincing Movie Psychopath Performances". In 2025, it was one of the films voted for the "Readers' Choice" edition of The New York Times' list of "The 100 Best Movies of the 21st Century," finishing at number 105.

=== Sequel ===
A direct-to-video sequel, American Psycho 2, directed by Morgan J. Freeman and starring Mila Kunis, was released in 2002. The sequel's only connection with the original is the death of Patrick Bateman (played by Michael Kremko wearing a face mask), briefly shown in a flashback. The film was denounced by Bret Easton Ellis. In 2005, Kunis expressed embarrassment over the film, and spoke out against the idea of a sequel.

=== In popular culture ===
Finnish melodic death metal band Children of Bodom used the film's ending monologue "My pain is constant and sharp and I do not hope for a better world for anyone" as a segue between two songs on their 2003 album Hate Crew Deathroll. The film's influence can be seen in Kanye West's music video "Love Lockdown" and Maroon 5's music video "Animals". American metalcore band Ice Nine Kills wrote a song based on the film for their 2021 album The Silver Scream 2: Welcome to Horrorwood called "Hip to Be Scared" and features Papa Roach vocalist Jacoby Shaddix. Funny or Die recreated the "Hip to be Square" scene with Huey Lewis in the Bateman role and "Weird Al" Yankovic in the Allen role. In the scene, Lewis discusses the artistic merits of the film American Psycho and shows the actual scene. It ends with Lewis killing Yankovic saying "Try parodying one of my songs now, you stupid bastard!" The video then plays "I Want a New Duck", Yankovic's parody of the Huey Lewis and the News song "I Want a New Drug".

In 2013, FX and Lionsgate were developing an American Psycho television series that would have served as a sequel to the film. It was to be set in the present, with Patrick Bateman in his 50s, grooming an apprentice (Andrew Low) to be just like him. Production of the series was mentioned in 2015, and again in 2021, though there have been no further updates since.

The film is frequently a topic of memes and has been said by some to be relevant due to its themes and satirical nature; on the other hand, however, the character of Patrick Bateman has seen genuine adoration among men attracted to the idea of the "sigma male" and the capitalist ideals of "hustle culture" espoused by Bateman, even though many people have interpreted the film as heavily criticizing capitalism.

== See also ==
- List of films featuring psychopaths and sociopaths
- List of cult films

== Works cited ==
- Cheung, Harrison (2012). Christian Bale: The Inside Story of the Darkest Batman. Dallas, Texas: BenBella Books. ISBN 9781936661640.
- Lucas, Tim (2007). Mario Bava: All the Colors of the Dark. Video Watchdog. ISBN 9780963375612.
