= Cold War Museum (disambiguation) =

Cold War Museum most commonly refers to The Cold War Museum located in Vint Hill Farms Station in Warrenton, Virginia, United States.

Cold War Museum may also refer to:

- Diefenbunker, also known as "Canada's Cold War Museum" located in Carp, Ontario, Canada
- Plokštinė missile base, also known as "Cold War Museum" located in Plungė, Samogitia, Lithuania
- Tagansky Protected Command Point, also known as "Cold War Museum (Moscow)" located in Moscow, Russia
- Naval museum complex Balaklava, formally named "The Cold War Museum" located in Balaklava, Crimea, Ukraine
- The National Cold War Exhibition in Royal Air Force Museum Midlands
- Cold War museum, located in Stevns Klint, Zealand, Denmark

== See also ==
- Cold War
