= Yxlö =

- Location within Stockholm Location within Sweden
- Coordinates: 58°57′N 18°01′E
- Country: Sweden
- Province: Södermanland
- County: Stockholm County
- Municipality: Nynäshamn Municipality

Yxlö is an island in the southern part of Stockholm archipelago, which forms part of Nynäshamn Municipality, Stockholm County, Sweden.

Yxlö is connected to the neighbouring island of Herrö by road bridge, and Herrö is in turn connected to the mainland by a further series of bridges. In the opposite direction, Yxlö is connected to the island of Muskö by the 2,895-metre (9,498 ft) long Muskö Tunnel under the waters of the Baltic Sea. The road across the bridges and islands, and through the tunnel, is known as the Muskö road and was originally built in the 1960s to provide access to the Muskö Naval Base.
