= Hoppet =

Hoppet may refer to:

- Hoppet (film) - a 2007 Swedish film directed by Petter Næss
- Hoppet, Haninge Municipality - an urban area on the island of Muskö, Haninge Municipality, Stockholm County, Sweden
- Kangaroo Hoppet - a long-distance cross-country skiing race held in Falls Creek, Victoria, Australia
- Leva på 'Hoppet' - a 1951 Swedish comedy film directed by Göran Gentele
- Op Hoop van Zegen - a 1900 Dutch play by Herman Heijermans, performed under the title Hoppet in some countries
