= Muskö Canal =

Canal in Sweden

Coordinates: 59°1′0″N 18°8′15″E

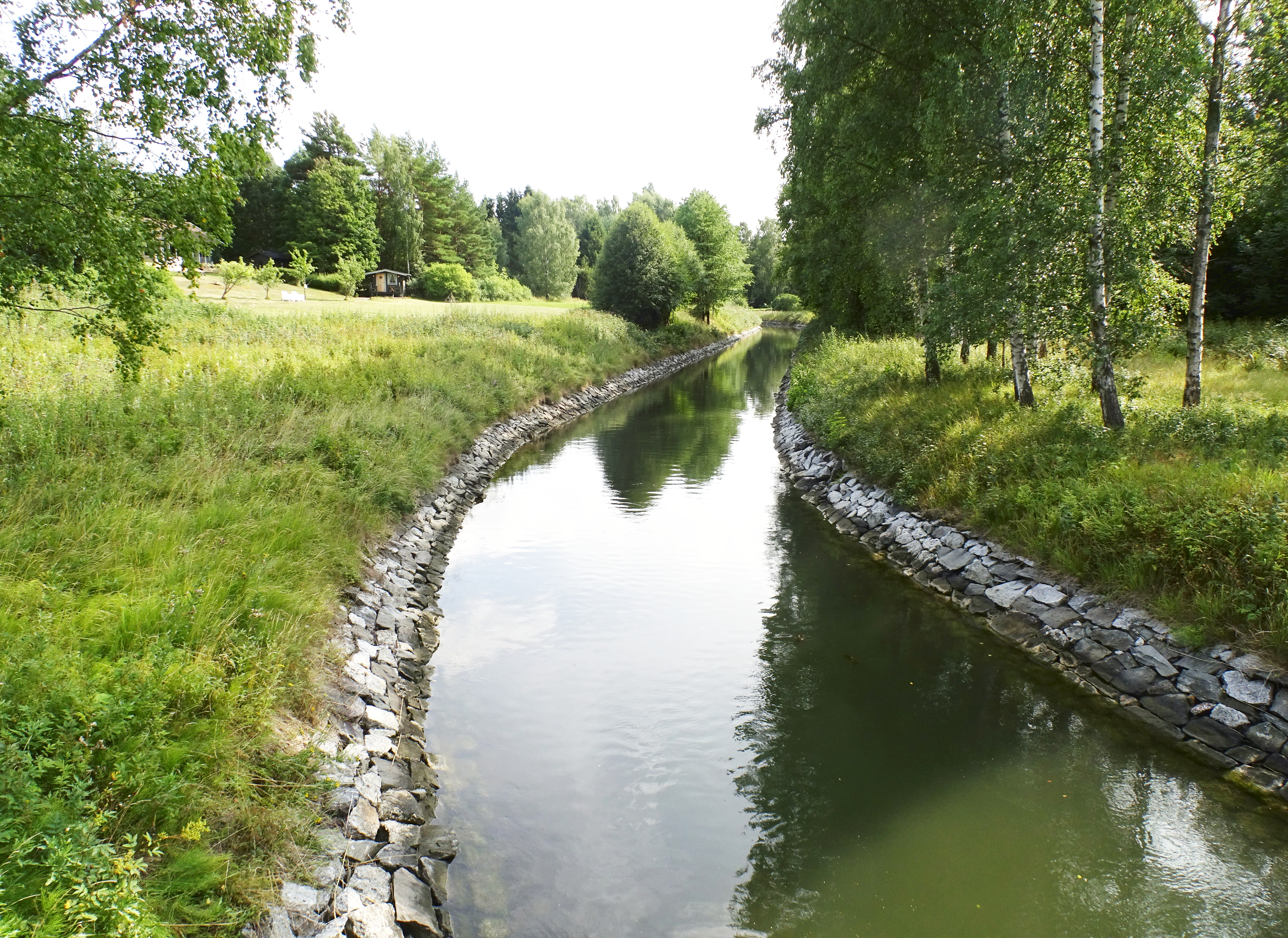
- The Muskö Canal in 2017

Specifications
- Locks: 0
- Status: Fully operational
- Navigation authority: Sjöfartsverket

The Muskö Canal (Swedish: Muskö kanal) is an artificial canal that divides the island of Muskö into western and eastern halves, linking Mysingen to the south with Horsfjärden to the north. The canal itself is 350 metres (1,150 ft) in length, and with its approaches has a total length of about 1 kilometre (0.62 mi). It has a depth of 1.7 metres (5 ft 7 in), a bottom width of 3 metres (9.8 ft), a width at water level of 8 metres (26 ft), and a navigation clearance of 3 metres (9.8 ft) above water level.

== History ==
Originally the two halves of Muskö were separated by a natural sound, but post-glacial rebound had rendered this route unusable by the early 1700s. The first artificial canal was constructed in 1719 by the Russians as part of their campaign of raids at that time. Over time and with the land continuing to rise, the first canal became less usable and eventually, by the start of the 20th century, it had disappeared.

In the 1930s the local fishermen proposed that the canal be re-excavated, as it would save them an hours voyage between their fishing grounds and market. In 1933 work commenced on re-opening the channel, as a public works project giving 52 unemployed men a paid job, and the canal opened in 1934. As built, a hand-operated bascule bridge was provided to carry the road between the two halves of the island, but this proved difficult to operate and was fixed in position. In the 1970s, a modern bridge was built north of the old bridge, which was left in place for pedestrian and bicycle traffic.
