= Foraker Glacier =

Glacier in Alaska, United States

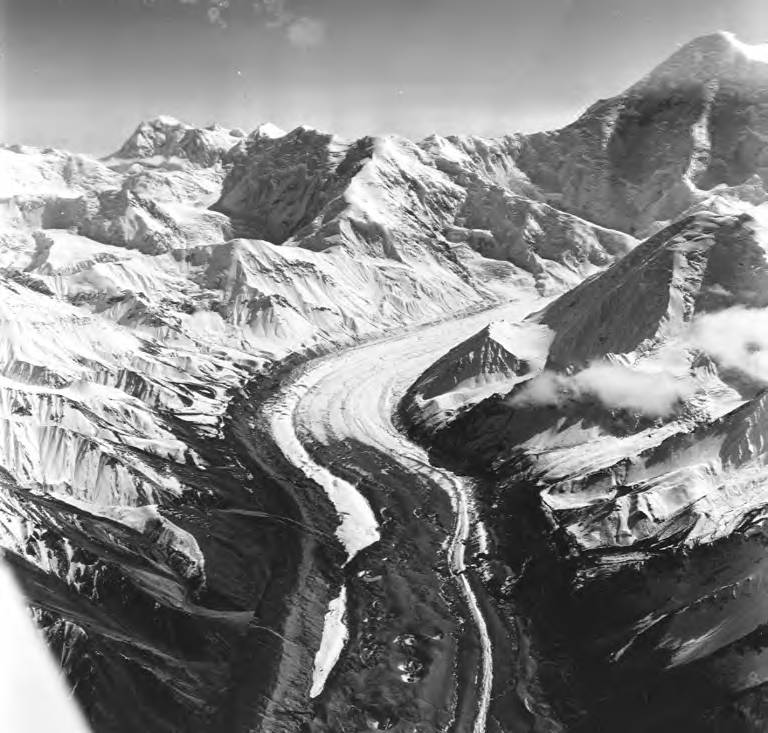
- The glacier in 1969

- Location within Alaska
- Interactive map of Foraker Glacier
- Type: Valley glacier
- Location: Denali Borough, Alaska
- Coordinates: 63°05′09″N 151°26′17″W
- Length: 15 miles (24 km)

Foraker Glacier is a glacier in Denali National Park and Preserve in the U.S. state of Alaska. The glacier begins in the Alaska Range on the north side of Mount Foraker, moving northwest for 15 miles (24 km). It is the source of the Foraker River.

== See also ==
- List of glaciers
