= Herron (name) =

Herron is a surname and a given name. Notable people with the name include:

== Surname ==
- Alan Herron (born 2003), Jamaican football player
- Andrew S. Herron (1823-1882), American politician
- Andy Herron, Costa Rican football player
- Bob Herron (1924–2021), American stuntman and actor
- Camille Herron, marathoner and ultrarunner
- Carolivia Herron, American writer of children's and adult literature
- Catherine Herron (born 1983), Canadian ice hockey player and coach
- Charles Lee Herron (born 1937), American former fugitive
- Cindy Herron, singer with En Vogue
- Denis Herron, Canadian professional ice hockey goaltender
- Francis J. Herron, Union general during the American Civil War
- George D. Herron (1862-1925), American clergyman, lecturer, writer, and Christian socialist activist
- Helen Herron Taft (maiden name: Herron), First Lady of the United States from 1909 to 1913
- John Herron (Pittsburgh)
- John S. Herron, Mayor of Pittsburgh in the 1930s
- John Herron (Alberta politician), Canadian Member of Parliament from Alberta in the early 1900s
- John Herron (New Brunswick politician), Canadian Member of Parliament from New Brunswick in the 1990s
- John Herron (Australian politician) (1932–2019), Australian Senator
- Keturah Herron (born 1980), American politician from Kentucky
- Leslie Herron, Australian barrister, judge, chief justice and lieutenant governor of New South Wales
- Lucy Herron, founding trustee of the charity Msizi Africa
- Mark Herron, actor and fourth husband of Judy Garland
- Mick Herron, British novelist
- Paul Herron (1924–2004), American politician from Kentucky
- Roy Herron (1953–2023), American politician from Tennessee
- Tim Herron, American golfer
- Tom Herron, Grand Prix motorcycle road racer
- Tyler Herron (born 1986), American baseball player
- William Blake Herron, screenwriter, director and actor
- Zach Herron, member of the boy band Why Don't We

=== Second surname ===
- James Herron Hopkins, Member of the U.S. House of Representatives from Pennsylvania

== Given name ==
- Herron C. Pearson, Member of the U.S. House of Representatives from Tennessee
- Herron Berrian, Liberian soccer player

== See also ==
- Edward O'Herron Jr., American businessman & politician
- Herron (disambiguation)
- Herronen (surname)
- Harron (surname)
