= Muskö (urban area) =

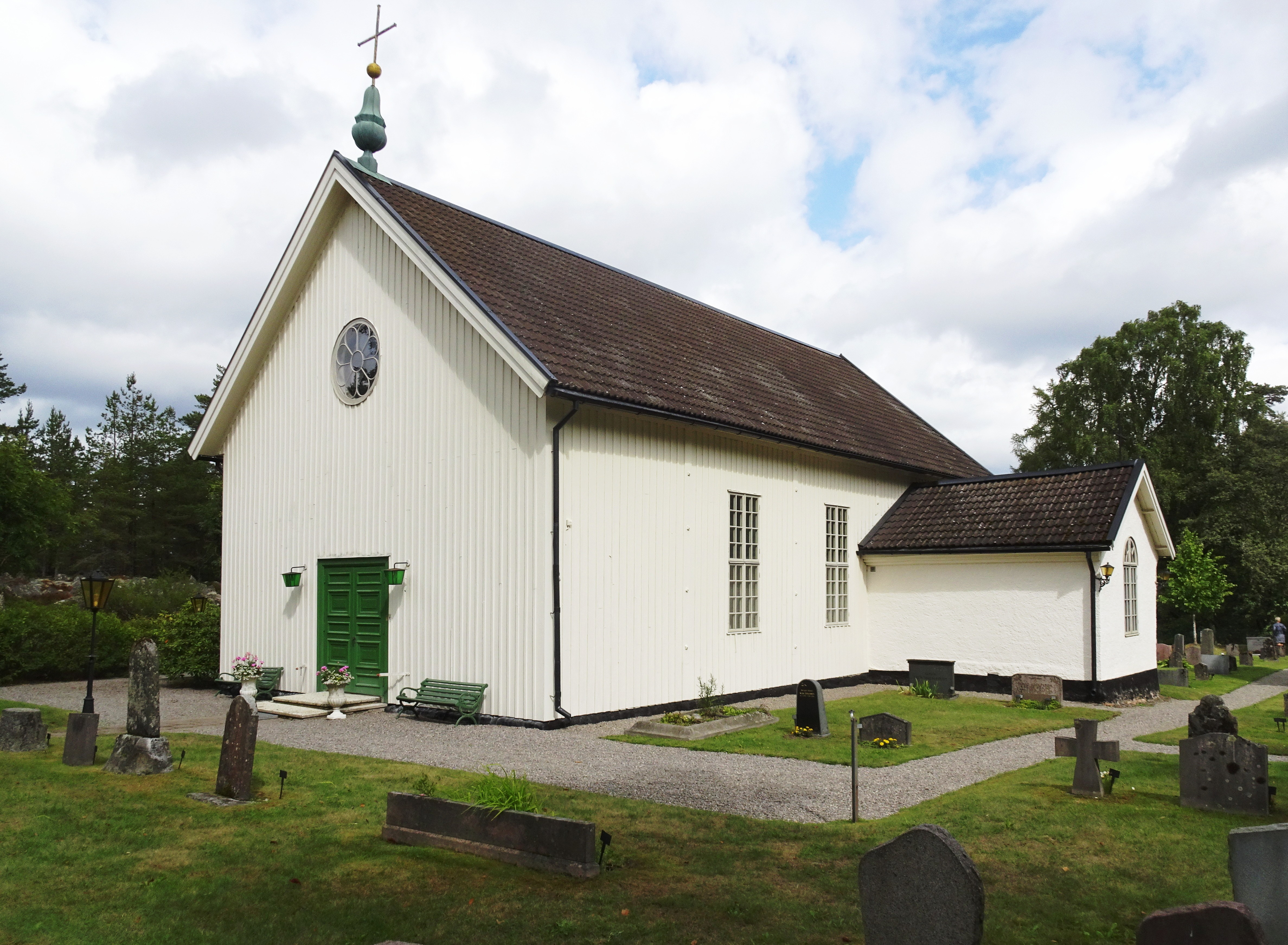
- Muskö kyrka

- Location within Stockholm Location within Sweden
- Coordinates: 59°0′4″N 18°7′48″E
- Country: Sweden
- Province: Södermanland
- County: Stockholm County
- Municipality: Haninge Municipality

Area
  - Total: 0.65 km^{2} (0.25 sq mi)

Population (2015)
  - Total: 271
  - Density: 417/km^{2} (1,080/sq mi)
- Time zone: UTC+1 (CET)
  - Summer (DST): UTC+2 (CEST)

Muskö is an urban area on the island of Muskö and in Haninge Municipality, Stockholm County, Sweden.
