= Herrö, Nynäshamn Municipality =

Herrö
- Location within Stockholm Location within Sweden
- Coordinates: 58°57′40″N 17°59′47″E Herrön, Nynäshamns kommun
- Country: Sweden
- Province: Södermanland
- County: Stockholm County
- Municipality: Nynäshamn Municipality

Herrö, or Herrön, is an island in the southern part of Stockholm archipelago, which forms part of Nynäshamn Municipality, Stockholm County, Sweden.

Herrö is connected to the neighbouring islands of Himmelso and Yxlö by road bridge, and Himmelso is in turn connected to the mainland by a further bridge. The road across the bridges and island is known as the Muskö road and was originally built in the 1960s to provide access to the Muskö Naval Base.
