= Foraker River =

- Location of the mouth of the Foraker River in Alaska

Location
- Country: United States
- State: Alaska
- District: Denali Borough

Physical characteristics
- Source: Denali National Park and Preserve
  - location: Foraker Glacier, Alaska Range
  - coordinates: 63°07′43″N 151°34′24″W
  - elevation: 3,251 ft (991 m)
- Mouth: Minchumina Lake
  - location: near village of Lake Minchumina
  - coordinates: 63°53′27″N 152°05′45″W
  - elevation: 646 ft (197 m)
- Length: 60 mi (97 km)

The Foraker River (Lower Tanana: Kwalana or Kotalhno) is a 60-mile (97 km) stream in central Alaska in the United States. It drains an area on the north slope of the Alaska Range on the south edge of the Tanana Valley southwest of Fairbanks. The Herron River is a major tributary.

The Foraker River issues from Foraker Glacier in Denali National Park and Preserve, northwest of Mount Foraker. It flows through the tundra to the north of the Alaska range in a generally northwest direction to Minchumina Lake near the village of Lake Minchumina.

The river was named for its glacial source in 1925 by S.R. Capps of the U.S. Geological Survey. Other names or variants include Seyh Khoolanh No' and Gotothna River.

== See also ==
- List of rivers of Alaska
