= Herron Pharmaceuticals =

Herron Pharmaceuticals Pty Ltd is an Australian manufacturer of pharmaceutical and natural healthcare items. Herron group is now owned by Perrigo which was founded in 1887.
