= Herron River =

- Location of the mouth of the Herron River in Alaska

Location
- Country: United States
- State: Alaska
- District: Denali Borough

Physical characteristics
- Source: Herron Glacier, Alaska Range
  - location: Denali National Park and Preserve
  - coordinates: 63°05′35″N 151°39′11″W
  - elevation: 3,134 ft (955 m)
- Mouth: Foraker River
  - location: 17 miles (27 km) south of Lake Minchumina
  - coordinates: 63°38′53″N 152°09′31″W
  - elevation: 801 ft (244 m)
- Length: 48 mi (77 km)

The Herron River (Lower Tanana: K'otaal No’ or Tsatasronik) is a 48-mile (77 km) tributary of the Foraker River in central Alaska in the United States. It drains an area on the north slope of the Alaska Range on the south edge of the Tanana Valley southwest of Fairbanks.

The river issues from Herron Glacier in the northern Alaska Range in Denali National Park and Preserve, northwest of Mount Foraker. It flows through the tundra to the north of the Alaska range in a generally northwest direction, forming part of the boundary between national park lands and national preserve lands.

The river was named for its glacial source in 1925 by S.R. Capps of the U.S. Geological Survey. Other names or variants include K'otal No', Tsatasronick and Sishuluthna River.

== See also ==
- List of rivers of Alaska
