= Hoppet, Haninge Municipality =

Hoppet
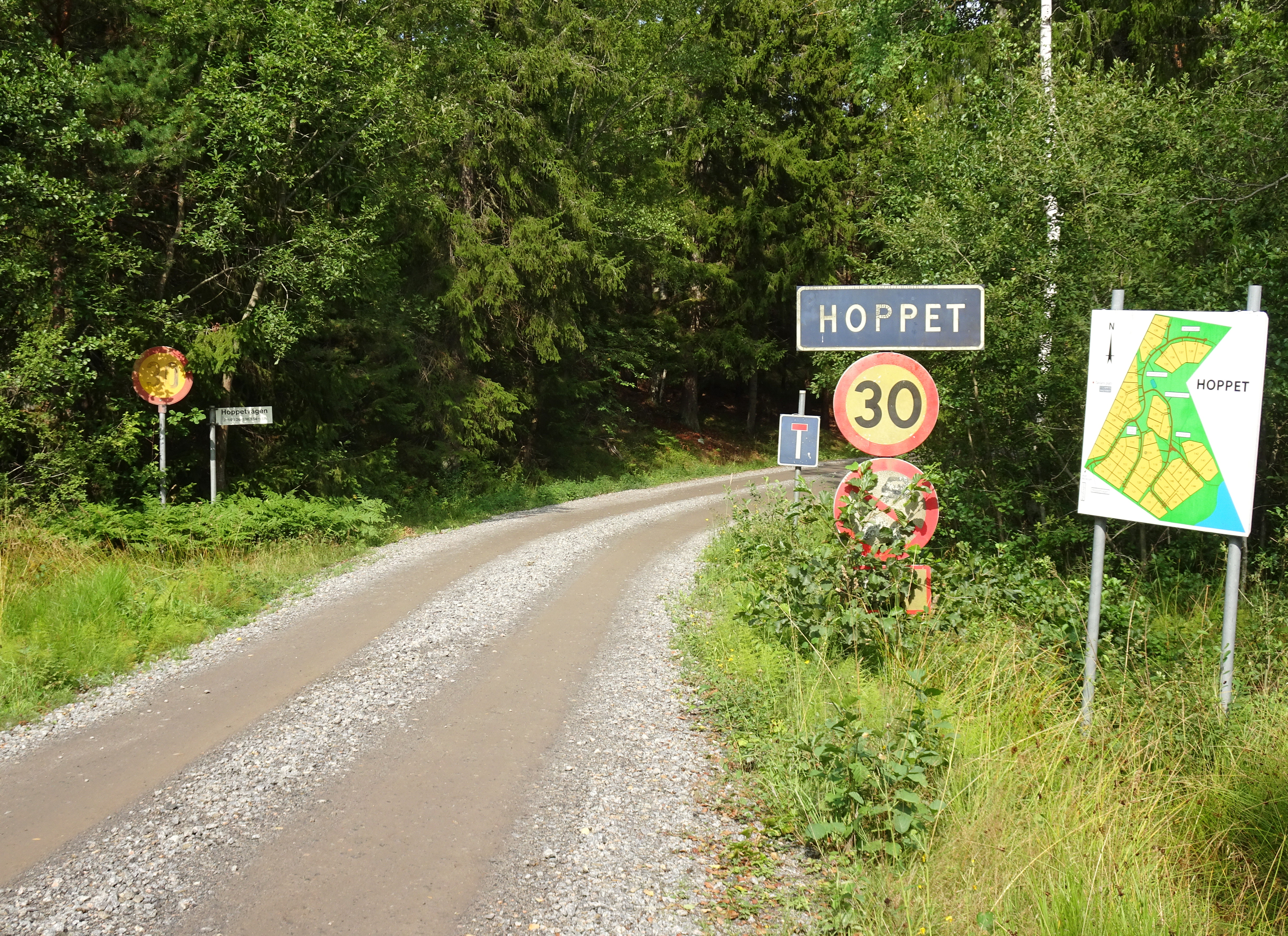

- Location within Stockholm Location within Sweden
- Coordinates: 59°1′34″N 18°8′48″E
- Country: Sweden
- Province: Södermanland
- County: Stockholm County
- Municipality: Haninge Municipality

Area
  - Total: 4.56 km^{2} (1.76 sq mi)

Population (2015)
  - Total: 218
  - Density: 47.8/km^{2} (124/sq mi)
- Time zone: UTC+1 (CET)
  - Summer (DST): UTC+2 (CEST)

Hoppet is an urban area on the island of Muskö and in Haninge Municipality, Stockholm County, Sweden.
