= Muskö =

- Location within Stockholm Location within Sweden
- Coordinates: 58°59′N 18°08′E
- Country: Sweden
- Province: Södermanland
- County: Stockholm County
- Municipality: Haninge Municipality

Area
  - Total: 29.69 km^{2} (11.46 sq mi)

Population (31 December 2020)
  - Total: 258
  - Density: 8.69/km^{2} (22.5/sq mi)

Muskö is an island in the southern part of Stockholm archipelago, which forms part of Haninge Municipality, Stockholm County, Sweden. It is best known for the Muskö Naval Base. There are also two urban areas (tätort) on the island: Muskö and Hoppet.

Access to the mainland is by the Muskö Tunnel, with a length of 2,895 metres (9,498 ft), which connects Muskö to the neighbouring island of Yxlö under the waters of the Baltic Sea. Yxlö is itself connected to the mainland by a series of road bridges. The road across the bridges and islands, and through the tunnel, is known as the Muskö road and was originally built in the 1960s to provide access to the naval base.

The island of Muskö is divided into east and west halves by the Muskö Canal, an artificial channel first dug at the beginning of the 18th century and re-excavated in the 1930s.
