= Herron Glacier =

Glacier in Alaska, United States

- Location within Alaska
- Interactive map of Herron Glacier
- Type: Valley glacier
- Location: Denali Borough, Alaska
- Coordinates: 63°03′18″N 151°36′54″W
- Length: 14 miles (23 km)

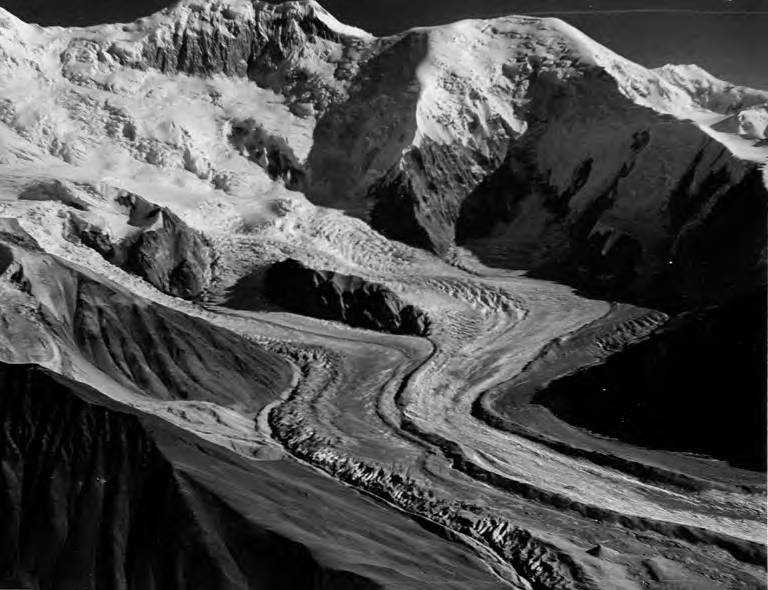
Herron Glacier, mountain glacier, August 8, 1957

Herron Glacier is a glacier in Denali National Park and Preserve in the U.S. state of Alaska. The glacier begins in the Alaska Range on the north side of Mount Foraker, moving northwest for 14 miles (23 km). It is the source of the Herron River. The name was given by A.H. Brooks of the U.S. Geological Survey to honor Lt. Joseph S. Herron, who mapped much of the region.

== See also ==
- List of glaciers
