= Olavsvern =

Former navy base in Tromsø, Norway

- Tromsø, Troms, Norway

Site information
- Type: Former military base
- Owner: Olavsvern Group

Location
- Location of Olavsvern Olavsvern (Norway)
- Coordinates: 69.5309°N 19.0125°E

Site history
- Built: 1967
- In use: 1967–2009; 2021—present

Olavsvern (lit. 'Olav's protection/defense') is a decommissioned underground submarine base formerly used by the Royal Norwegian Navy located just outside the city of Tromsø. It is located along the European route E8 at the entrance to the Ramfjorden from the Balsfjorden.

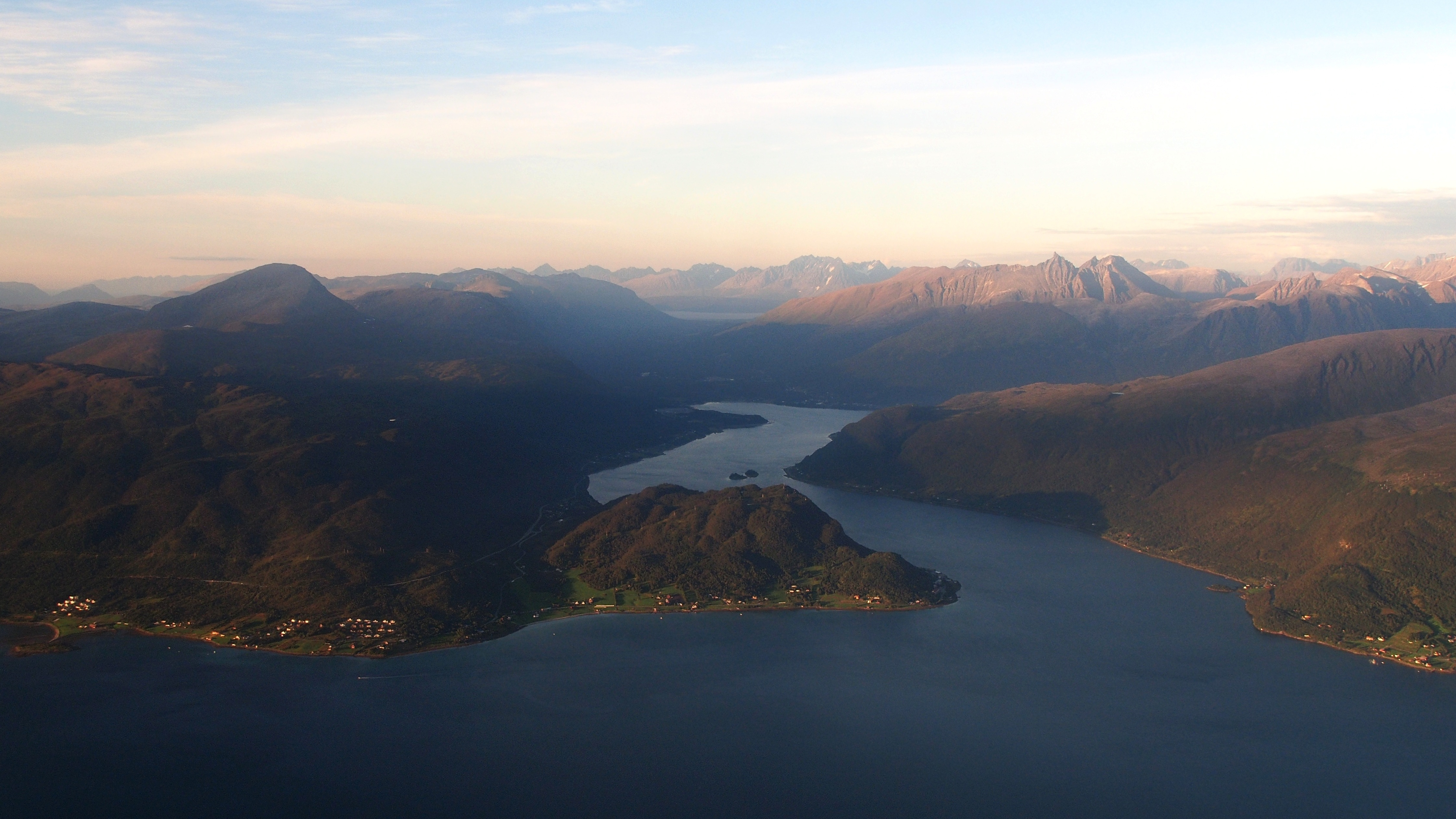
Aerial View of Ramfjord

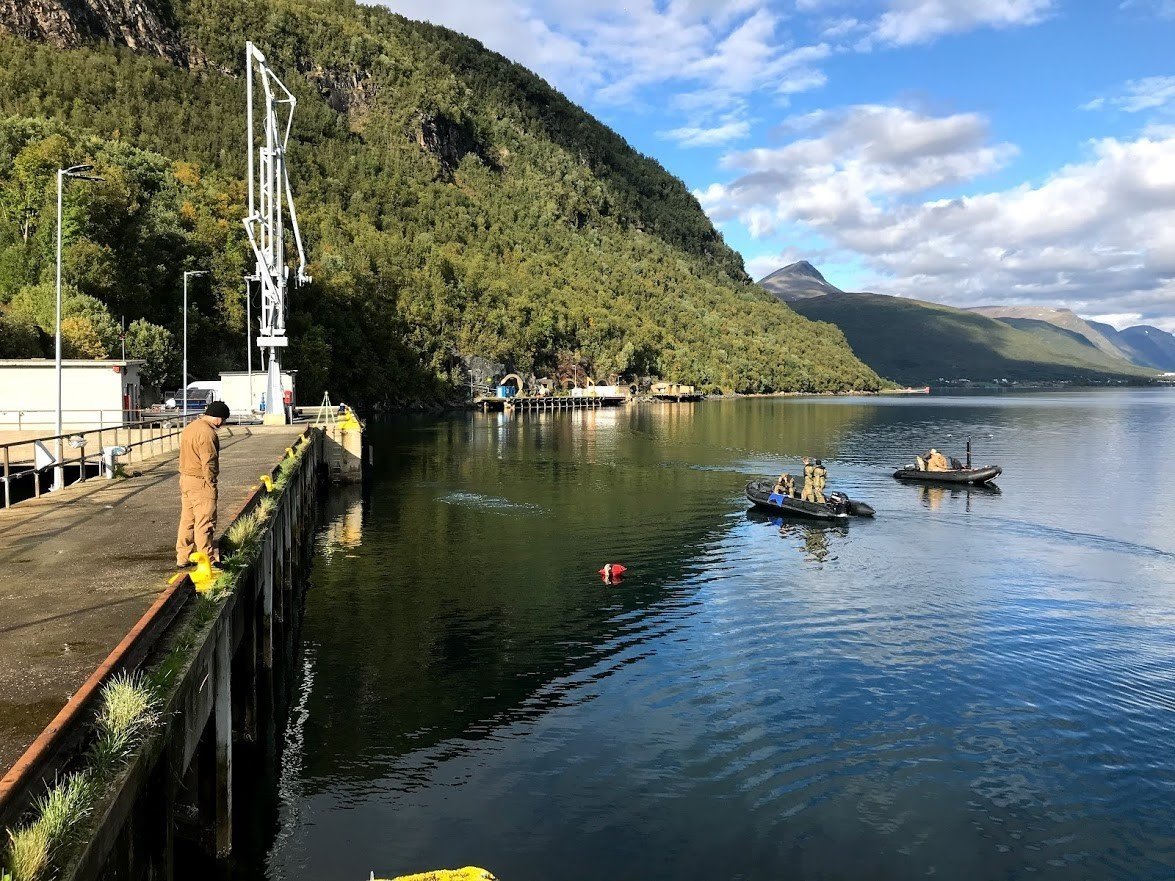
Olavsvern

== History ==
During the Cold War, Norway wanted a secret naval base within the Arctic Circle. The base was essentially carved into a mountain just outside the city of Tromsø. It is a massive complex constructed at a cost of 4 billion Kroner burrowed into a mountain. It lost its status as an Orlogsstasjon (navy base) in 2002 and was consequently closed down in 2009 by the government of prime minister Jens Stoltenberg.

== Infrastructure ==
The base has an inside surface of 25,000 square metres (270,000 sq ft) beneath 274 metres (899 ft) of hard rock, including 13,000 square metres (140,000 sq ft) of housing, and 3,000 square metres (32,000 sq ft) of deep-water dock. In one of the mountain halls, there is a dry dock for submarines. The internal dry dock is capable of accommodating 6 submarines simultaneously.

The base further consists of a 340-metre-long (1,120 ft) dry dock, workshops, offices and ammunition depots. The base also has external docks capable of accommodating larger ships, among other US Navy SSN's and SSBN's.

The entrance to the facilities consist of a tunnel that is more than 900 metres (3,000 ft) long.

== Accidents ==
In 2005, an accident in a scuba exercise inside the base led to the death of SBS commander Lieutenant Colonel Richard van der Horst. The accident involved a swimmer delivery vehicle during an amphibious exercise.

In March 2022, James May suffered a broken rib when he crashed a Mitsubishi Evo in one of the tunnels during a competition between the show's presenters to see who could drive (and stop) the fastest while filming for a special episode of The Grand Tour, and was taken to the hospital.

== Decommissioning ==
The base was closed down in 2009 and put up for sale by the Norwegian government for NOK 105 million (US$17.5 million) in 2011 and later sold for NOK 38 million to Olavsvern Group Ltd, a company that announced its purpose to use the base as a maintenance base for oil platform rigs and drilling equipment. NATO approved the sale.

== Post-decommissioning ==
The base was rented by companies from Russia linked to state-owned Gazprom. Suspected Russian military activity aboard research vessels has concerned military experts, with Norwegian retired vice admiral Jan Reksten, former military second in command stating, ""Russia is a country where the state has a say over all commercial or semi-state business. It's clear, very few people know what happens on these vessels," stating the sale of Olavsvern was "a double loss" as "Norway's armed forces lost an important base and now there are Russian vessels docked there."

== Buyback ==
In 2019, a subsidiary of the Wilhelmsen Group called WilNor Governmental Services Ltd acquired 66% of the stock in Olavsvern Group Ltd, thus assuring majority control of the former base. The acquisition by WilNor Governmental Services was by request from the Norwegian Defence Logistics Organization (FLO).

The acquisition allows the Norwegian Defence Forces and its allies to resume operations at the base, as the Wilhelmsen Group has a long history of supplying and cooperating with the Norwegian Defence Forces.

In 2015, WGS entered into a long-term contract to supply strategic logistics support for Norwegian and allied forces, among others the storage of ammunition. The contract also provides for several supply bases along the Norwegian coast, in order to ensure the Royal Norwegian Navy capability to maintain Norwegian sovereignty and defend the country against external threats. In 2020, there was talk of Olavsvern being used as a base for United States nuclear submarines.

As of March 2021 the base has started to host allied military units, such as the Dutch Marine Corps.
