= Harron =

Harron is a surname, and may refer to:

- Dawson Harron (1921-1988), British cricketer
- Don Harron (1924-2015), Canadian actor, composer, and author
- Gary Harron (contemporary), Canadian politician and government administrator from Ontario
- John Harron (1903–1939), American actor; brother of Robert Harron and Mary Harron
- Marion Janet Harron (1903-1972), U.S. judge
- Mary Harron (b. 1953), Canadian film director and screenwriter
- Mary Harron (actress), silent film era actress, sister of Harrons John and Robert also silent era actors
- Maurice Harron (b. 1946), Northern Ireland sculptor
- Robert Harron (1893–1920), American actor of the silent film era; brother of John Harron and Mary Harron

== See also ==
- Herron (name)
