= Muskö Naval Base =

Naval base in Sweden

Coordinates: 58.97967°N 18.063827°E

- Musköbasen
- Muskö in Sweden
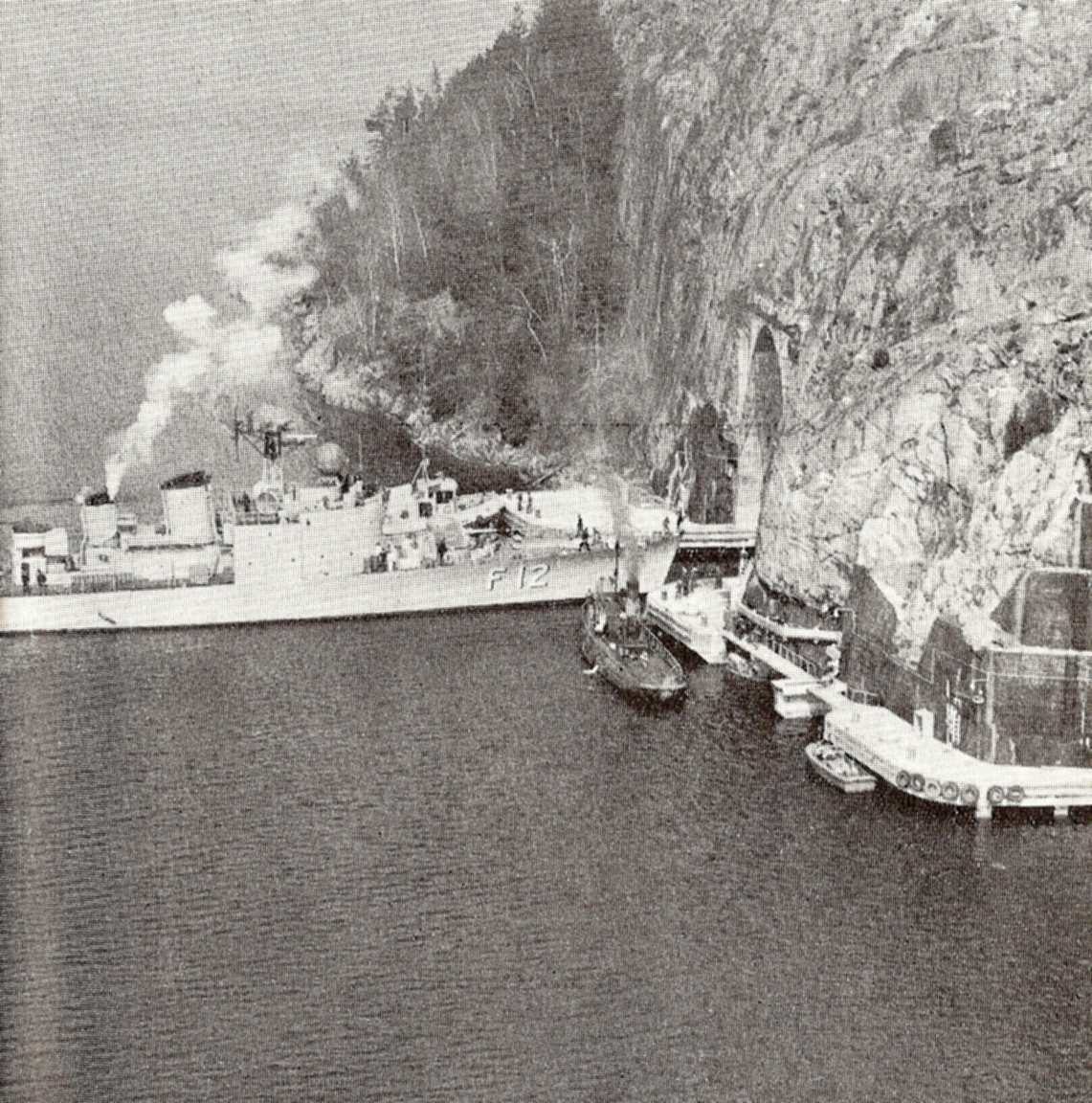
- HSwMS Sundsvall entering one of the openings to the naval base.

Site information
- Type: Naval base

Site history
- Built: 1950–1969
- In use: 1955–present
- Materials: Concrete, stone, steel
- Battles/wars: None

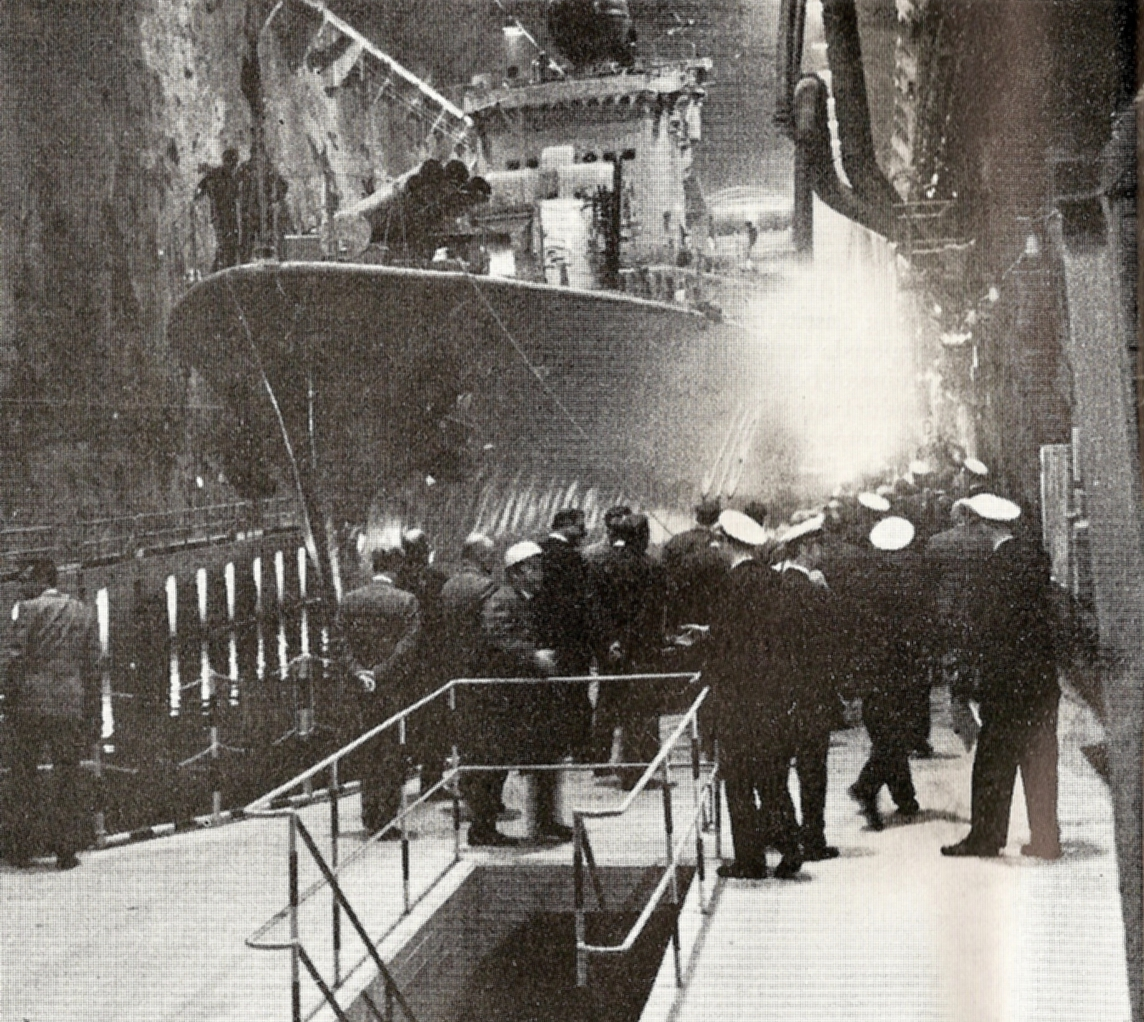
The Swedish destroyer HSwMS Småland in one of the underground docks in Muskö Naval Base (1960).

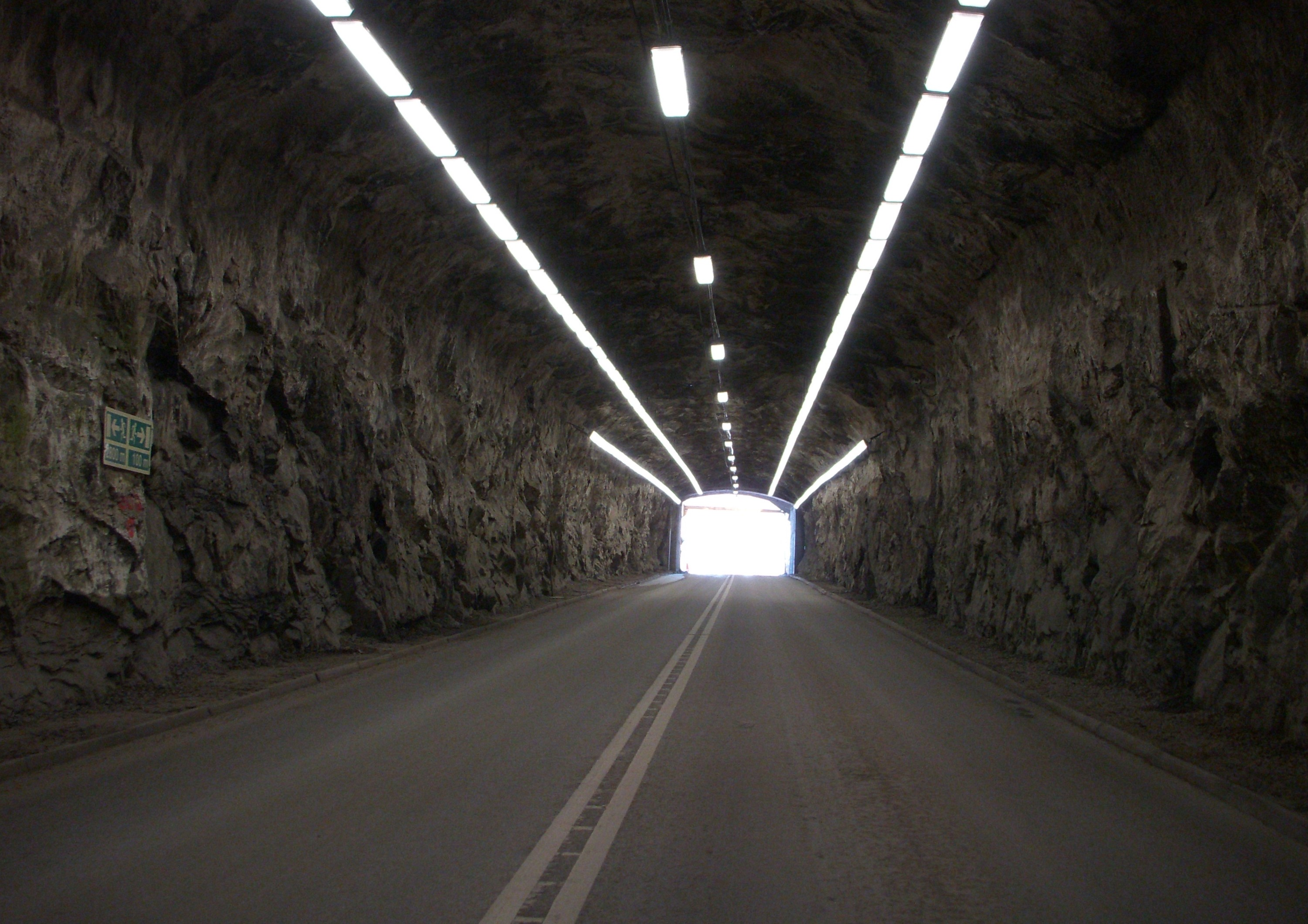
The Muskö tunnel

Muskö Naval Base (Swedish: Musköbasen) is a Swedish Navy underground naval facility on the island of Muskö just south of Stockholm in Haninge Municipality.

The construction of the base started in 1950 and was completed 19 years later in 1969. During the construction about 1.5 million tons of rock were removed. It has 3 docks, originally designed for destroyers and submarines. The underground base itself has an area of several km² and is connected by 20 km (12 mi) of underground roads.

In order to connect the base to the mainland, the Muskö road was built at the same time as the base. This crosses several bridges and intermediate islands before finally accessing the island of Muskö through the Muskö Tunnel, a 3 km (1.9 mi) long road tunnel running some 70 metres (230 ft) under the sea.

During the Cold War the underground facility was kept highly secret and not much information about it was known to the public. In 2004 the Swedish government decided that the navy should be concentrated to two bases only, the Karlskrona Naval Base and the Berga Naval Base, and much of the Muskö base was closed. However some parts of the facility were still used by the military. The underground shipyards were being operated under contract by Kockums AB and Muskövarvet AB. In the autumn of 2019, as part of an upgrade of defence facilities and manpower, the naval base was revived, and it was announced that it would also serve as seat of the main headquarters of the Swedish Navy.

One of the Swedish submarine incidents in October, 1982, took place just off Muskö Naval Base.

A survey carried out in 2000 concluded that sedimentation in the tunnels leading to docks contained PCBs, organotin compounds and heavy metals, mainly mercury and copper.

In 2019, Swedish naval command in the form of the Naval Staff returned to Muskö. In early 2020 it was confirmed that the base would be fully reactivated.
