= Fokus (magazine) =

Swedish news magazine

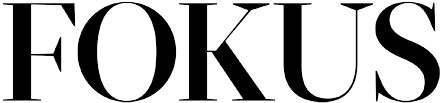

- cover of the 8–14 March 2013 issue, featuring politician Filippa Reinfeldt
- Editor-in-chief: Johan Hakelius
- Categories: Current affairs, news and culture
- Frequency: weekly
- Circulation: 31,000
- Founder: Martin Ahlquist, Martin Ådahl, Lars Grafström and Karin Pettersson
- First issue: December 2005
- Company: FPG Media AB
- Country: Sweden
- Based in: 12 Wallingatan; Stockholm; 111 60 Sweden
- Language: Swedish
- Website: www.fokus.se
- ISSN: 1653-4670
- OCLC: 85895055

Fokus is a Swedish-language weekly news and current affairs magazine. It was founded by Martin Ahlquist, Lars Grafström, Karin Pettersson and Martin Ådahl. It was first published in December 2005. In 2007, it was awarded the Swedish Publicists' Association's grand prize. The magazine publishes 41 issues per year and has a circulation of approximately 31,000. Fokus is editorially politically unbound. The magazine is owned and published by FPG Media, a Swedish limited company.

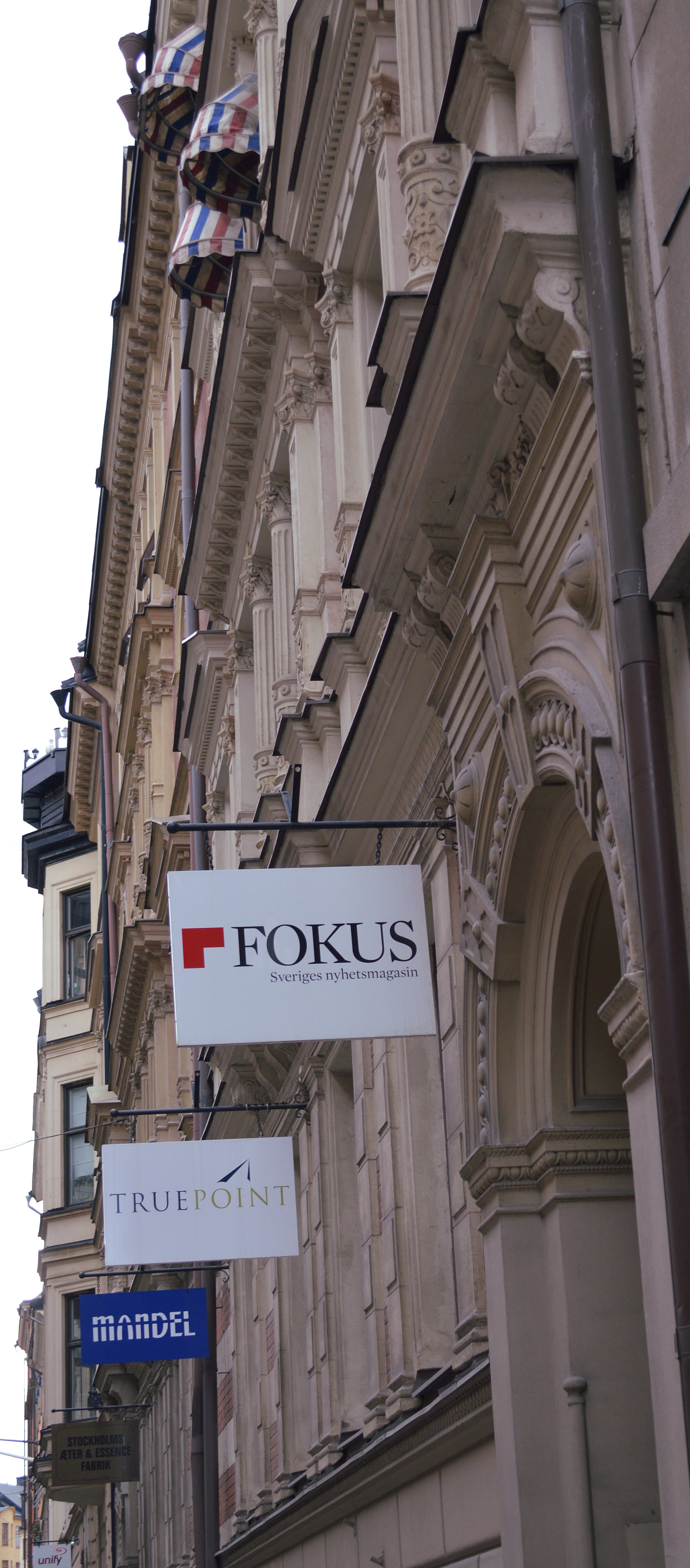
The paper's office is situated at Wallingatan in Stockholm.

== History ==
Fokus was founded in 2005 by Martin Ahlquist, Martin Ådahl, Lars Grafström and Karin Pettersson. Their ambition was to create a Swedish magazine equivalent of Time or Newsweek. In search for a financier for the magazine they turned to the chairman of the Ax:son Johnson investment company Nordstjernan and former editor-in-chief of Veckans Affärer, Johan Björkman. After much convincing, Björkman, agreed to finance Fokus through Nordstjernan. In mid-2005, the company FPG Media was formed to manage Fokus and the founders began recruiting journalists. A few months later the first issue of Fokus was published on Friday 2 December 2005.

When the founders plans for Fokus were announced many lauded the project as an interesting idea, but at the same time most analysts declared it doomed to fail. Sweden was seen as too small a country for a weekly news magazine. It would be hard to build an audience, when the Swedish daily newspapers already were very strong and of good quality. Furthermore, the high rate of English proficiency among the target Swedish audience would mean that the magazine would have to compete with well established English-language newsmagazines.

== Ownership ==
The magazine is owned and published by FPG Media, a Swedish limited company (aktiebolag), where the major share holders are Nordstjernan, the Johan Björkman Foundation, and Tagehus. These companies are in turn mainly controlled and owned by the prominent Swedish business family Ax:son Johnson.

In March 2013, the trade magazine Resumé reported that despite increasing circulation Fokus had made a projected loss of approximately 88 million SEK from 2005 until 2012. However, Viveca Ax:son Johnson, the chairwoman of Nordstjernan, commented that they were committed to Fokus for a much longer time than seven years. Together with the culture and science television station Axess TV, the magazine is seen as a prestige project for the Ax:son Johnson family, and they are prepared to invest money in it from other sectors of their business empire.

== Content ==
Fokus aims to cover the most important issues of every week in politics, science, economics and culture. The goal of the magazine is to give a greater comprehension and explanation of current affairs. The magazine covers both domestic and foreign issues. Each weekly issue reaches news vendors and subscribers on Friday mornings. Each issue typically contains in-depth articles on politics and economics, two or more chronicles, a longer interview and a portrait of a politician, a sport star, a business profile, a writer, a researcher or a philosopher, as well as coverage and reviews of culture. Fokus is editorially politically unbound. The magazine does not align itself with the political left or right; however, it takes a stand for the values of humanism, internationalism, and rationalism. Most of the Fokus' content is also published online, on fokus.se. In April 2013, the magazine announced that it would start charging non-subscribers for access to its online content.

=== Rankings ===
Every year, Fokus ranks the best universities in Sweden, the most powerful Swedes, the best municipalities to live in and the most successful municipalities in terms of social integration. In determining the most desirable municipalities to live in, at least 30 factors are taken into account, including such things as the quality of schools, healthcare, and crime and unemployment rates. Habo, Lomma, Danderyd, and Lund have all been ranked as most desirable to live in, while Haparanda, Ljusnarsberg, and Munkfors have been ranked as least desirable. The rankings usually garner attention in other news media. They have also been criticised, for example in a book by written the local-politician Magnus Nilsson and published by the think-thank Timbro, for favouring small homogeneous municipalities situated near larger cities. Fokus editor Martin Ahlquist has stated that the ranking should not been see as an evaluation of the work of local politicians, but rather as a guide for citizens and that it is therefore natural that some municipalities are favoured by their location.

=== Collaborations ===
In 2007, the wiki Makthavare.se was created by Fokus. The wiki was used in Fokus annual listings of the year's most powerful Swedes. From 2009 until 2012, Fokus operated Makthavare.se together with the blog Almedalsbloggen (owned by Inre Kabinettet AB). However, since May 2012, Makthavare.se is fully owned by Inre Kabinettet AB and Fokus is no longer involved in the operation of the wiki. Fokus collaborates with the French news magazine Le Point on coverage of international news. Fokus is the Swedish member of the International Consortium of Investigative Journalists and in 2013 it took part in the consortium's investigation of offshore bank accounts.

== Readership ==
The Fokus' primary target group is urban men and women between the ages of 25 and 65 with an interest in news and society. According to the Orvesto readership survey of 2012, 75 percent of the readers have a university degree and live in one of Sweden's three largest cities. The average age of the readers is 44 years and 75 percent of the readers are between the ages of 25 and 64. The magazine is distributed to readers throughout Sweden and to Swedes living abroad. In an attempt to reach more affluent and influential readers, Fokus has been distributed free of charge to passengers traveling business class with Scandinavian Airlines, Finnair, Malmö Aviation and SJ 2000. Since its first publication, Fokus has seen an almost continuous increase in reach and circulation. However, in 2012, the number of distributed copies decreased for the first time.

- Tidningsstatistik (circulation)
- Orvesto (reach)

== Staff ==
Editors-in-chief

- Karin Pettersson (2005–2009)
- Martin Ahlquist (2009–2015)
- Anna Körnung, acting (2015)
- Johan Hakelius (2016–present)

Columnists

- Ulrika Knutson
- Johanna Koljonen
- Thomas Engström
- Malte Persson
- Lisa Bjurwald
- Katarina Wennstam
- Johannes Forssberg
- Lotta Lundgren
- Klas Eklund

Former columnists:

- Martin Ådahl
- Lena Andersson
- Jenny Andersson
- Margareta Garpe
- Jasenko Selimovic
- Hans Blix

== Awards and nominations ==
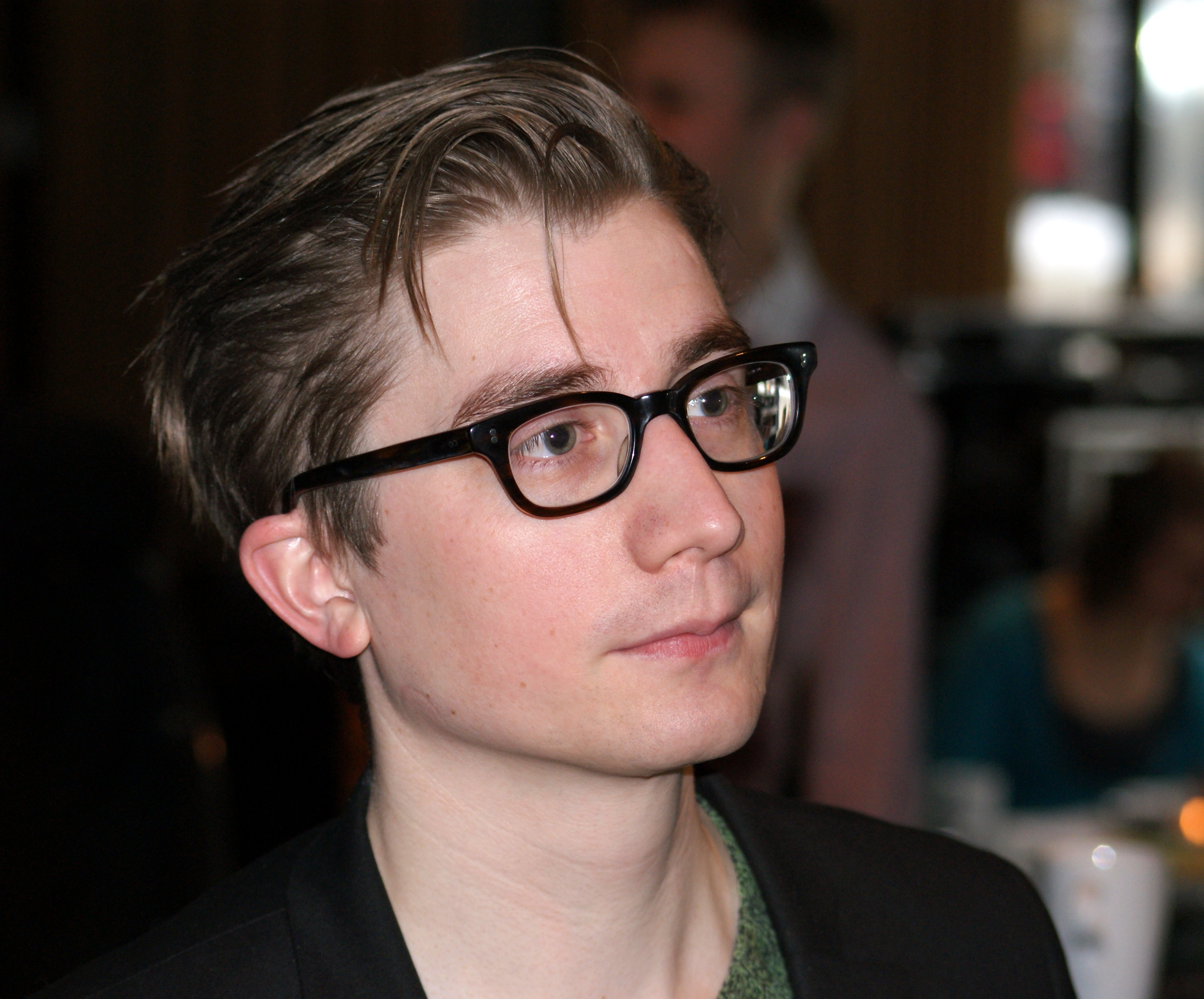
Torbjörn Nilsson has twice been named Journalist of the Year, for his writing in Fokus.

In 2006 and 2012, the journalist Torbjörn Nilsson was named Journalist of the Year by the Swedish Magazine Publishers Association for his writing on politics in this magazine; in 2007; Urban Hamid was given the same award for his coverage of Iraq. Johan Anderberg was nominated for the award in 2014, but did not win. In 2007 and 2008, Lena Andersson and Thomas Engström, respectively, were named Columnists of the Year by the same association for their writing in Fokus. In 2009 Fokus' wiki Makthavare.se was named Digital Media of the Year by the association. Claes Lönegård was named New Talent of the Year (an award given to journalists under the age of 30) in 2010 and Maggie Strömberg was nominated for the same award in 2012.

In May 2007, Fokus was awarded the Swedish Publicists' Association's grand prize for its revitalisation of long form journalism, shown especially in its coverage of the political affairs surrounding the 2006 Swedish general election. Some of the magazine's coverage of the election was later collected in a book together with texts from the magazine Vi, and published by Weyler publishing and Fokus in 2011.
