= Helena Dyrssen =

Swedish jurist and politician (born 1959)

Chief Director of the Swedish Tax Agency
- In office 21 January 2013 – 1 December 2016
- Preceded by: Magdalena Andersson

Personal details
- Born: Helena Maria Håstad; 19 July 1959 (age 67) Uppsala, Sweden
- Party: Liberal People's Party
- Education: Stockholm University

Helena Maria Dyrssen (née Håstad; born 19 July 1959) is a Swedish jurist and politician. From 2013 to 2016 she was the Chief Director of the Swedish Tax Agency. She left her post shortly after Swedish Television announced that Dyrssen tried to warn her former colleague Frank Belfrage that his assets were being investigated by journalists as part of the Panama Papers investigation.

Dyrssen was educated at Stockholm University, and holds an jur.kand. She was state secretary in the Ministry of Culture under Minister for Culture Birgit Friggebo from 1991 to 1994.

Subsequently, she worked in the business world, first as CIO at TV4 and then in a similar position at the insurance company If P&C Insurance. In 2005, she was appointed Chief of Staff for the Liberal People's Party party leader's staff with the main task to lead the collaboration with the other parties in the Alliance for Sweden prior to the 2006 general election.

Dyrssen was made acting party secretary on 5 September 2006 for the Liberal People's Party since the former party secretary Johan Jakobsson was forced to resign because of his connection to the Swedish general election, 2006, computer infringement affair.

When the Reinfeldt Cabinet assumed office on 6 October 2006, she became state secretary in the Prime Minister's Office with responsibility for coordination of the Liberal People's Party. She left the position on 21 January 2013, having been appointed new Chief Director of the Swedish Tax Agency.

She is married to Gustaf Dyrssen, a lawyer, with whom she has two sons.
