= Stockholm Business School =

- Företagsekonomiska institutionen
- Type: Public
- Established: 1962
- Affiliations: AACSB; AMBA
- Head: Maria Frostling
- Academic staff: 100
- Administrative staff: 40
- Students: 3,526 (2021)
- Postgraduates: 32
- Location: Stockholm, Sweden; 59.3575°N 18.0539°E
- Campus: Campus Albano
- Language: English / Swedish
- Nickname: SBS / Feken
- Website: sbs.su.se

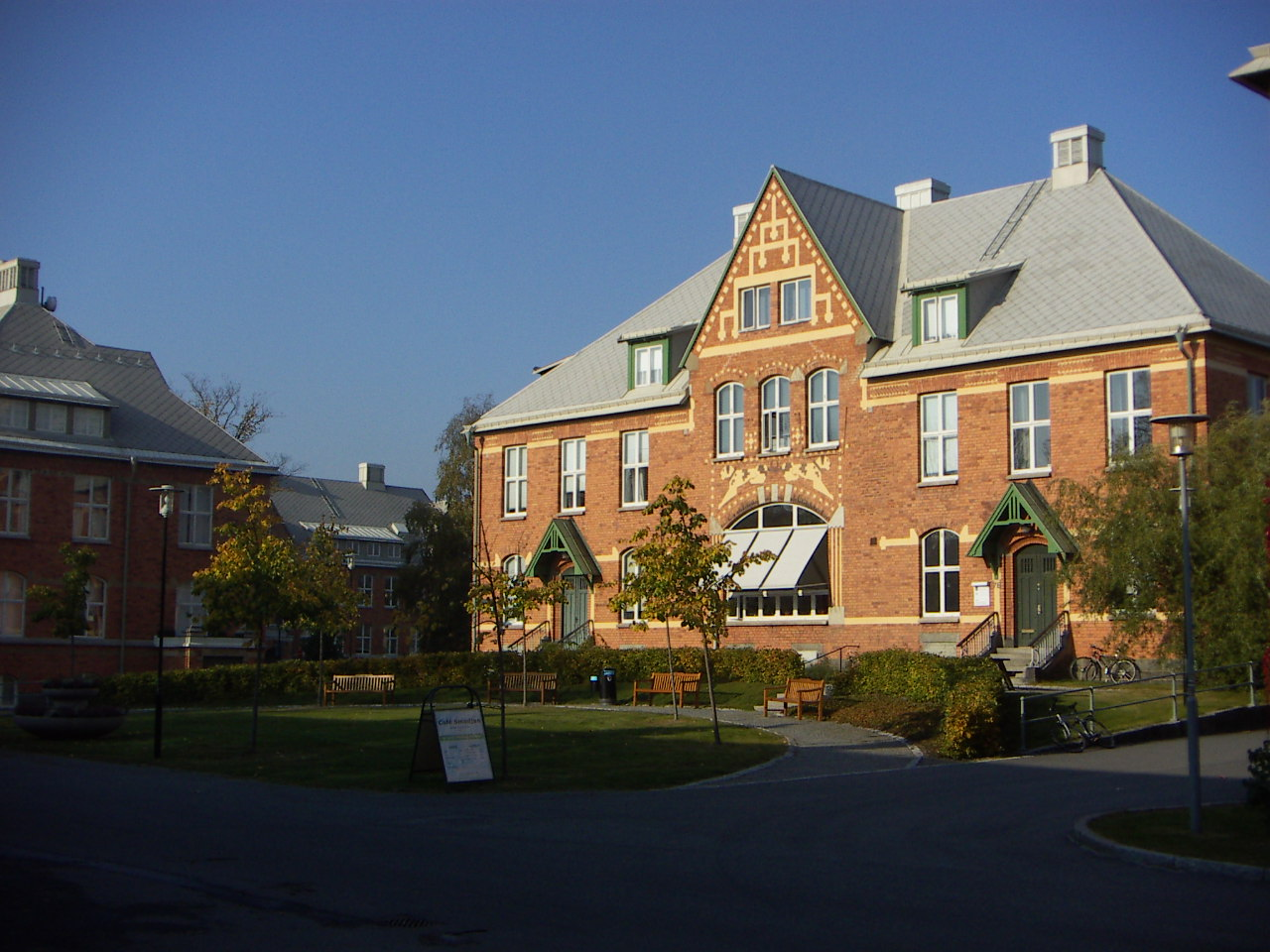
Campus Kräftriket.

Stockholm Business School (SBS; Swedish: Företagsekonomiska institutionen) is one of the largest academic departments at Stockholm University with around 3 500 students and 120 researchers/lecturers. SBS offers BSc, MSc programmes along with PhD. Through close ties with other academic departments and regular collaborations with key business actors, the School has become a melting pot for interdisciplinary research and education generating new perspectives on current topics within business and beyond.

== History ==
SBS had a modest beginning at the end of the 1950s when Stockholm School of Economics offered a dozen study places to students at the Stockholm College (the University was founded in 1960). As interest from students was high, the number of study places however multiplied rapidly and the courses offered increased in number and content.

In 1960 Stockholm College received university status and became Stockholm University. Two years later, in 1962, SBS became an independent department of the University. Two people in particular were of great significance during the establishment of Stockholm Business School; Professor Gerhard Törnquist and Professor T. Paulsson Frenckner.

== Research ==
Stockholm Business School carries out innovative social science research about markets, organisations and the people who operate in them. Researchers at SBS are active within a variety of sub-disciplines related to the main areas of marketing, accounting, management and finance.

== Education ==
SBS offers cross-disciplinary education with the explicit intention of broadening the conventional conception of business studies to include humanistic, cultural and societal values. At SBS you can study international degree programmes on both undergraduate and postgraduate level.

== Exchange studies ==
SBS has partnership agreements with over 100 universities around the world and welcomes some 300 exchange students every year. In order to be eligible to study as an exchange student at Stockholm Business School, you must be nominated by your home institution.

== Fees and scholarships ==
Higher education in Sweden is free for students from countries within the EU, EEA and Switzerland. Students from outside the EU/EAA/Switzerland who wish to study in Sweden are required to pay fees. The price per academic year for studies at Stockholm University within the Humanities/Social Sciences/Law is SEK 90,000. Stockholm University has a scholarship scheme aimed at especially qualified students coming from countries outside of EU/EEA/Switzerland.

The Swedish Institute also administer several scholarship schemes.

== Executive MBA ==
The two-year executive MBA programme is an advanced professional development programme with courses that include management, leadership, organisation, production and strategy. The programme is designed to help general and senior manager participants lead their organisations, and business units, in a professional and responsible manner – through the fostering of a critical-reflective and holistic perspective. The programme is available in both Swedish and English.

== Notable alumni ==
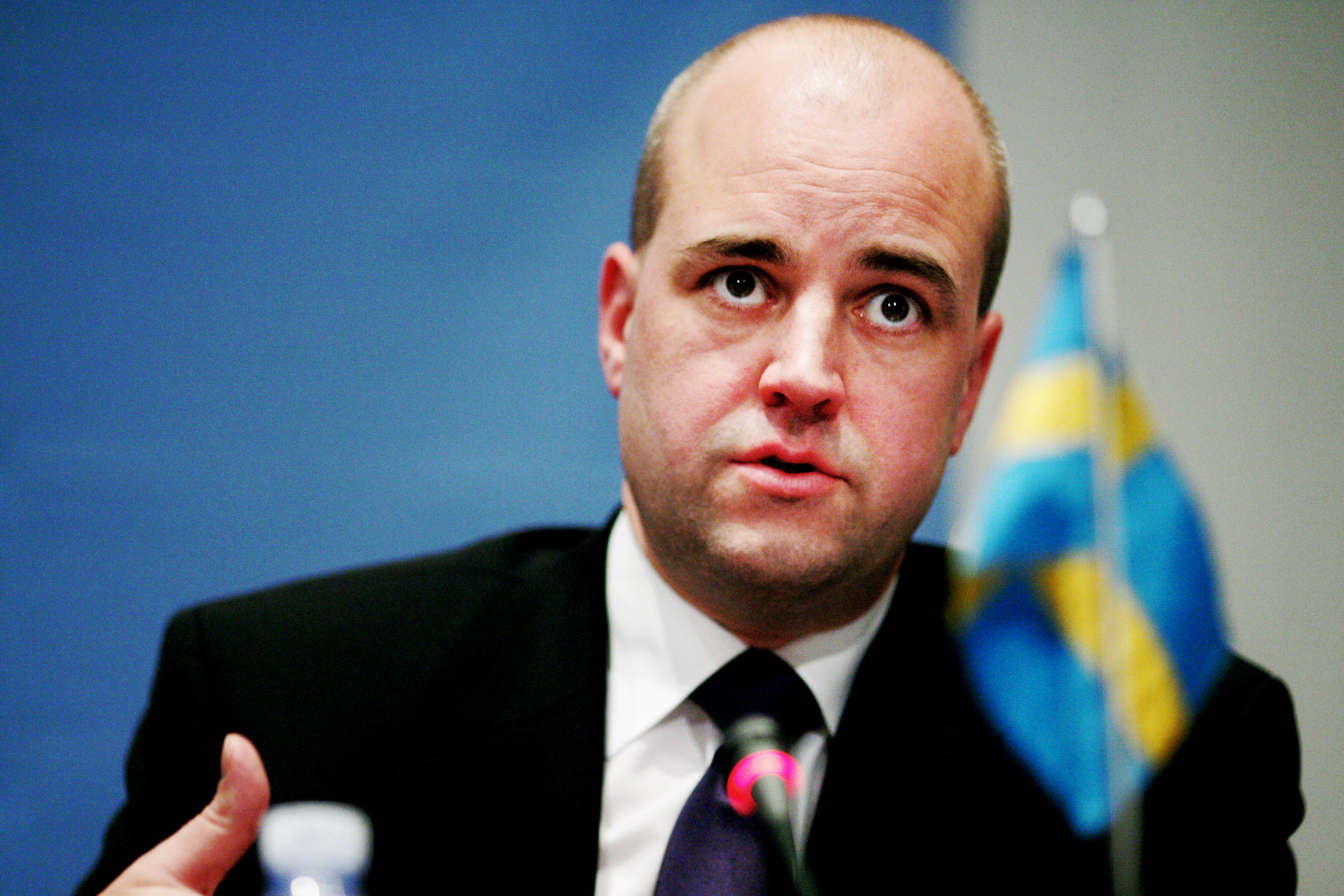
Fredrik Reinfeldt, former Prime Minister of Sweden.

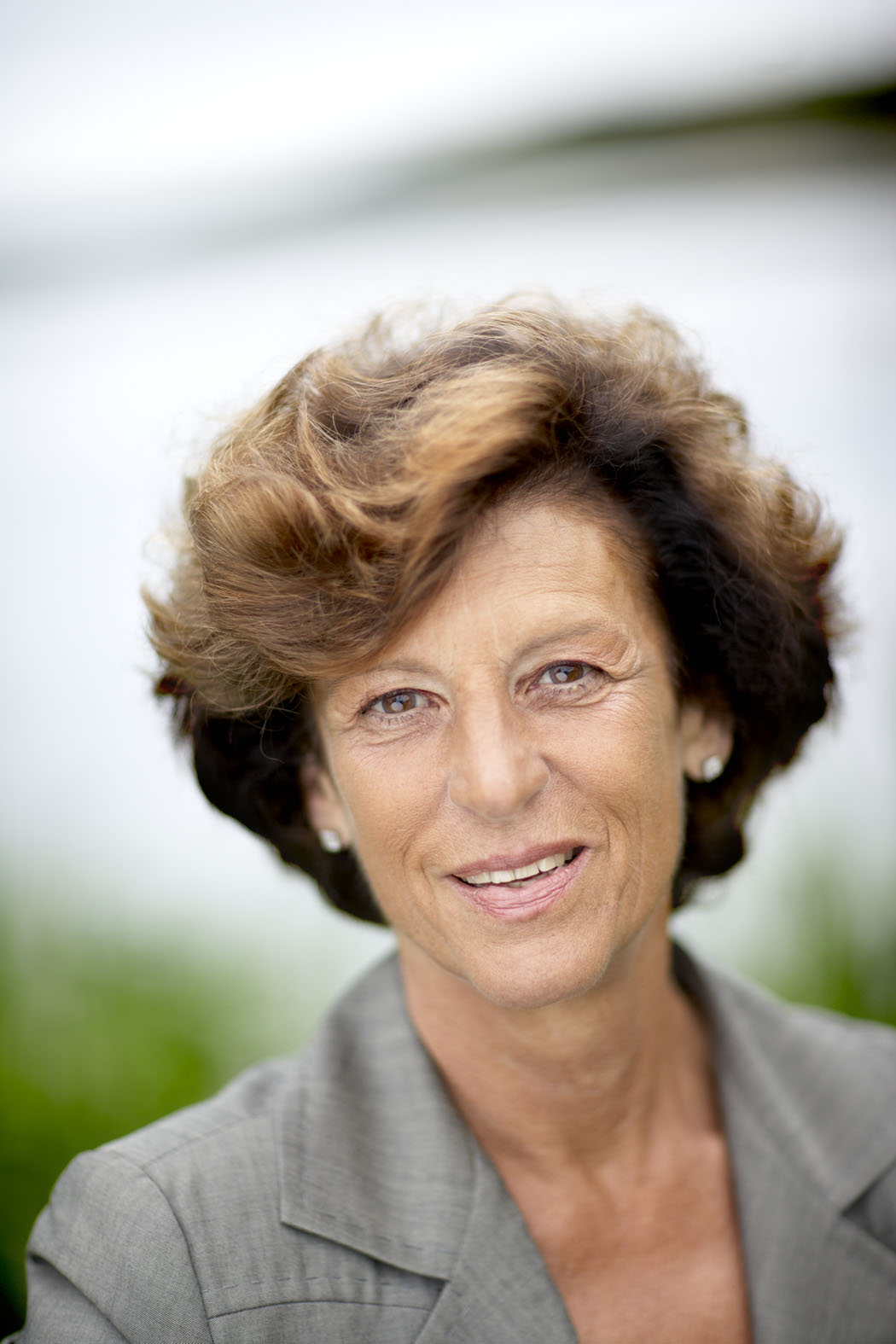
Antonia Ax:son Johnson, most famous for her engagement in the Axel Johnson Group.

Alumni from SBS can be found in all sectors of society, often in leadership positions within public and private organisations.

- Anders Borg – Swedish Minister for Finance (2006-2014).
- Annika Falkengren – President and CEO of the Swedish bank Skandinaviska Enskilda Banken (SEB).
- Antonia Ax:son Johnson – Swedish business woman.
- Fredrik Reinfeldt – Prime Minister of Sweden (2006-2014).
- Johan Staël von Holstein – Swedish tech-profile.
- Maria Lynn Ehren – Miss Universe Thailand 2017.
- Michael Wolf – Former CEO of the Swedish bank Swedbank.
- Nicklas Andersson – Savings advisor at Avanza.
- Ola Rollén – CEO of Hexagon.
- Peter Norman – Minister for Financial Markets (2010-2014).
- Stefan Persson – Businessman and profound in Hennes & Mauritz.
- Urban Bäckström – Former governor of Sveriges riksbank and former CEO for Svenskt Näringsliv.

== See also ==
- Stockholm School of Economics
- Stockholm University
