= Wilful Disregard =

2013 novel by Lena Andersson

- First edition
- Author: Lena Andersson
- Original title: Egenmäktigt förfarande – en roman om kärlek
- Translator: Sarah Death
- Genre: novel
- Set in: Stockholm
- Publisher: Natur & Kultur (Sweden); Picador (UK)
- Publication date: 2013 (Sweden); June 2015 (UK)
- Publication place: Sweden
- Pages: 208
- ISBN: 978-1447268918

Wilful Disregard – A Novel About Love (Swedish: Egenmäktigt förfarande – en roman om kärlek, lit. 'Arbitrary Conduct – A Novel About Love') is the sixth novel by Swedish author Lena Andersson, published in 2013.

The book was released in the UK in June 2015.

It won the August Prize in 2013 and in the same year the Literature Prize given by the Swedish newspaper Svenska Dagbladet.

== Plot ==
The book tells the story about a writer called Ester Nilsson. She meets an artist called Hugo Rask in an unusual way – because he is listening in the audience when she delivers a talk about him. Despite being in a steady relationship, the novel tells the story of Nilsson's relationship with Rask, and betrayal.

== Reception ==
In an interview in Fokus on October 31, 2014, Swedish director Roy Andersson claimed he was the inspiration for Hugo Rask.
