= Niklas Svensson =

Swedish journalist and media personality (born 1973)

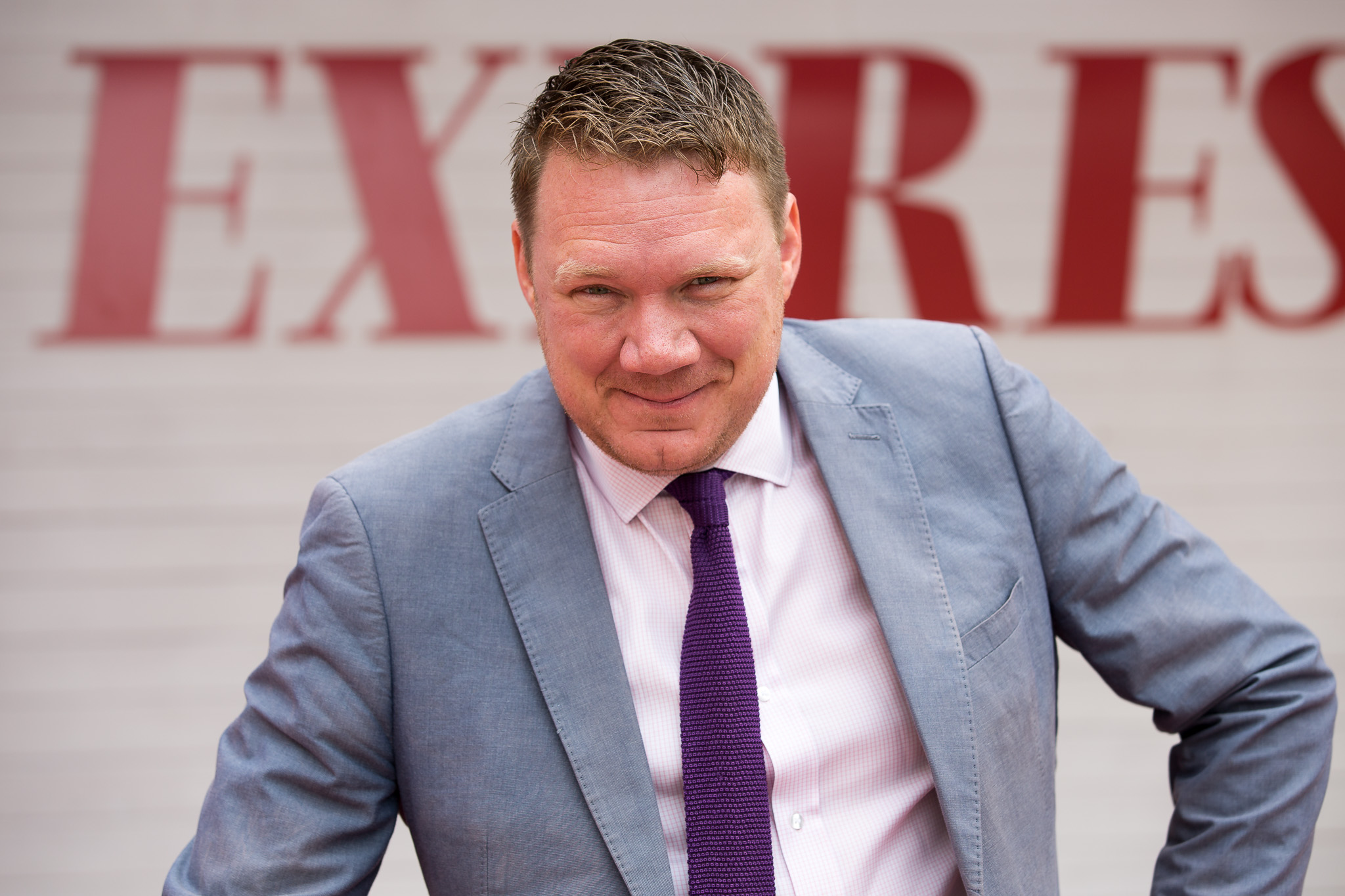
- Niklas Svensson in 2014.
- Born: Niklas Svensson; 15 January 1973; Asarum, Karlshamn, Blekinge County
- Occupations: Journalist, broadcaster, author

Niklas Svensson (born 15 January 1973) is a Swedish journalist and media personality.

== Biography ==
Svensson was employed at newspaper Sydöstran between 1988 and 1991, and then at newspaper Norra Skåne until 1993. He was then employed a short time for Värnpliktsnytt, the newspaper of the Swedish Armed Forces. From 1994 until 2006, he was worked for daily newspaper Expressen, interrupted only in 1995 when he wrote for Metro. At Expressen, he was the foreign and war correspondent, with elements in entertainment, law, and politics.

Notable revelations that Svensson has made are that former Prime Minister Göran Persson had shoplifted candy while in office, and that former Minister for Integration Jan O. Karlsson held a private crayfish party financed by tax payers.

Along with Martin Melin, winner of the world's first season of Expedition Robinson, Svensson wrote Robinsonboken, published in 2003 by the Bazar förlag.

Svensson was in September 2006 convicted of police impersonation by the Court of Appeal for Western Sweden. Shortly afterwards, he was suspended from his job at Expressen. He was later expelled from his job after the revelation of his involvement in the computer infringement affair prior to the 2006 general election. Svensson, who admitted guilt, was convicted of three computer infringements by Stockholm District Court in April 2007.

Svensson founded freelance newscompany Nyhetsbolaget in November 2006, and is currently the company's CEO. Nyhetsbolaget initially owned Politikerbloggen, also founded by Svensson. Politikerbloggen was purchased in September 2007 by TV4, and shortly afterwards, he began to work as a news reporter on TV4.

In February 2010, he returned to Expressen after editor-in-chief Thomas Mattsson recruited him back. In 2010, Svensson was awarded the "Hasse Olsson's prize for business journalists" of 75,000 SEK for the coverage in TV4 of Vattenfall AB.

In 2012, he was named Sweden's 82nd most powerful person by Fokus.
