= Stockholm Program of Place Branding =

Center for Metropolitan Branding
- Type: International research program
- Headquarters: Stockholm, Sweden
- Official language: English, Swedish
- Project Leader: Per-Olof Berg
- Affiliations: Stockholm University School of Business
- Budget: SEK 1.3 million annual
- Website: www.fek.su.se/en/

Center for Metropolitan Branding or Stockholm Program of Place Branding is an international research program at Stockholm University School of Business. The program includes researchers from fields like marketing, branding, place branding, geography, and management. It sponsors research activities for scholars in the field of place branding, including its Advanced Seminar Series. The program is funded by the Swedish Research Council with an annual endowment of SEK 1.3 million.

The program has produced city reports on Jerusalem, Stockholm, Sydney, Hamburg, and San Francisco. These reports serve as data sources as well as case studies for academics in the fields of marketing, branding, place branding, and beyond. In addition to these publications, the program archives articles on branding for the public.
