= Berga, Haninge Municipality =

Building in Haninge Municipality, Stockholm County, Sweden

Coordinates: 59°04′45″N 18°08′22″E

Berga is partly an estate and partly an associated castle in Västerhaninge socken in Haninge Municipality, in Södertörn in Södermanland and in Stockholm County, Sweden.

== Berga village ==
Originally Berga was a village with ancient ancestry. Burial cairns from the Bronze Age and the Late Iron Age can be found on the mountains to the west and within the open landscape to the east and south there are several grave fields from the Early Iron Age, as well as cup marks and remains after now disappeared torp's and farms that have been in use since the Middle Ages. Berga is mentioned in writing for the first time in 1401 as "Dygraberghom", then "Berghom" in 1437. The village comprised in 1554-1573 four mantal of tax and one church homestead. The latter was located at the village of Fors, where runestone Sö 237 stands at the edge along the farm entrance.

== Berga seat farm ==
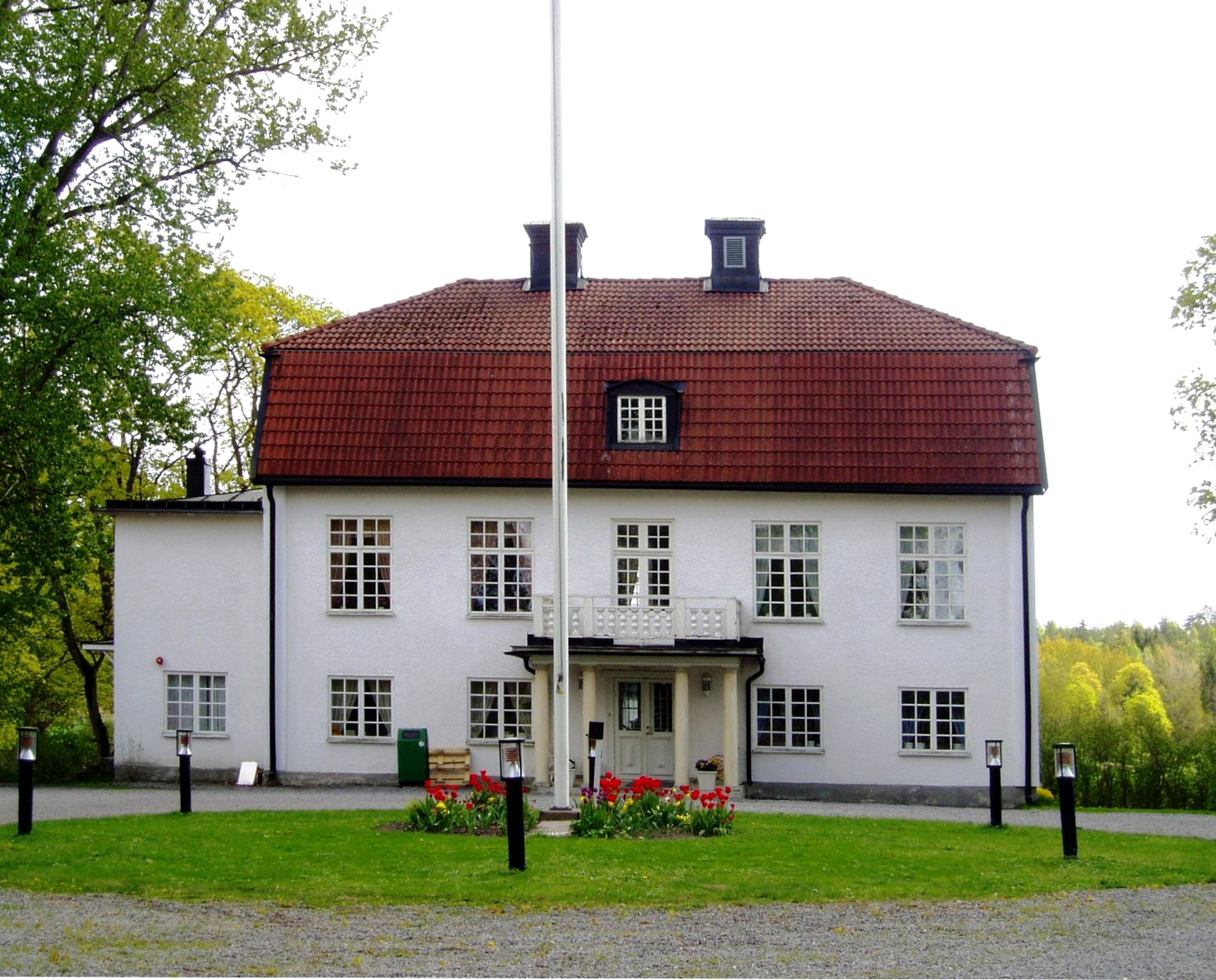
Building housing Berga Land Management School.

The first known owners of the farm that would become Berga seat farm was a Gierss in 1669, Ulfsparre in 1670 and Ehrenhjelm in 1686. Then the farm came to Törnflycht, in the 1700s again to Ehrenhjelm in 1722, Colling in 1735, Flach in 1740, Aulævill in 1772, then to the kommerseråd (official in the National Board of Trade) Ljunggren, managing director Zethelius and merchant A. Tydén. During the 1850s, the estate consisted of 2 mantal seat farm, with 5 subordinates, a mill and sawmill. During the 1880s the estate consisted of Berga 5 mantal, Dalby 1, Kapp Ekeby 2, Fors 1, Ormesta 1, Fors mill and sawmill. Later owners owned the island of Vitsgarn in Muskö socken located outside Berga.

In 1921, the Berga Agricultural School (Berga lantbruksskola) was founded at the mansion and its facilities, which today is Berga Land Management School (Berga naturbruksgymnasium).

In 1944, the Swedish state acquired Berga seat farm, after which the naval school at Skeppsholmen in Stockholm was relocated to Berga. The area included a beach strip that stretched from Vitså harbor to Näringsberg, which was divided into a naval port and naval schools. In addition to the beach strip, there was also a part of the area where Berga Agricultural School was located.

== Berga Castle ==
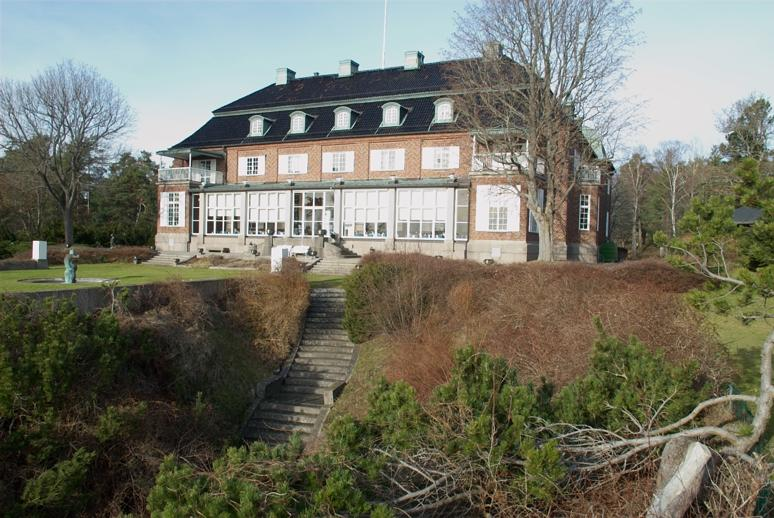
Berga Castle in 2008.

Berga Castle with associated buildings was built in 1913-15 by industrialist and art patron Helge Axelsson Johnson (1878–1941) according to drawings by architect Torben Grut (1871–1945). The two-storey building is built of red brick and rests on a pedestal of granite. It is equipped with a säteri roof and has two towered wings towards the courtyard side. During Helge Axelsson Johnson's ownership there was a large hunting ground at Berga with, among other things, wisents. These animals were later transferred to his private facility in Avesta. Other animals included in the park were deer, roe deer, European badgers, foxes, hares and a variety of bird species. In the autumn it was traditional moose hunting and King Gustaf V and his company occupied their own wing at Berga. Thus Helge Axelsson Johnson became hovjägmästare and the building was upgraded to a castle.

Helge Axelsson Johnson was a board member of family-controlled investment company Nordstjernan. He was also a great art lover and collected works at the castle by notable artists including Anders Zorn, Bruno Liljefors, Carl Eldh. When Helge Axelsson Johnson died in 1941, in accordance with his will, his entire estate was sold and most, except for a few grants for various charitable purposes formed a foundation, the Helge Helge Axelsson Johnson Foundation (Helge Ax:son Johnsons stiftelse), which issues grants annually for cultural purposes.

In 1944, Berga was sold to the Swedish state for 2.6 million, and the Swedish Navy gained access to sought-after land adjacent to Hårsfjärden, while the Swedish Forest Service (Domänverket) took over the agricultural lands and Berga property. During the last years of World War II and after, the area was expanded for military purposes and in 1946 the Swedish Navy Non-Commissioned Officers’ School started here. During all the years in the hands of the Swedish Armed Forces, the castle has been used for practical purposes, staffs, school management and in recent years also a naval command. Even today there is an office room with a view of Hårsfjärden at the disposal of the Chief of Navy.

== Gallery ==
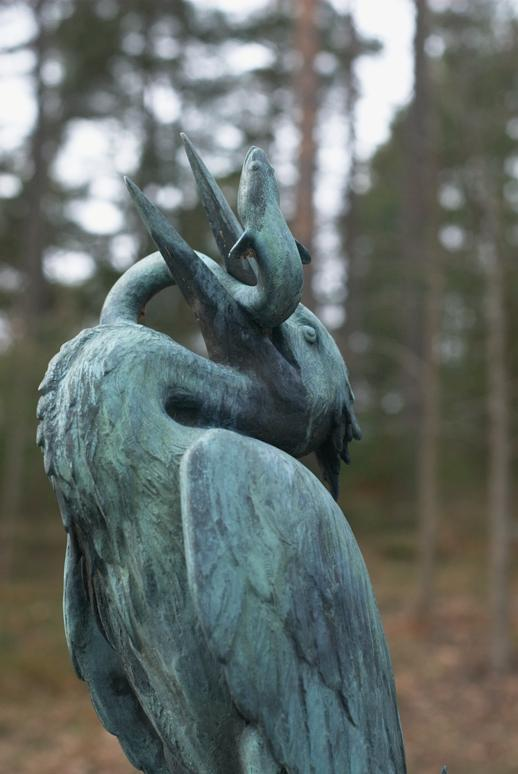

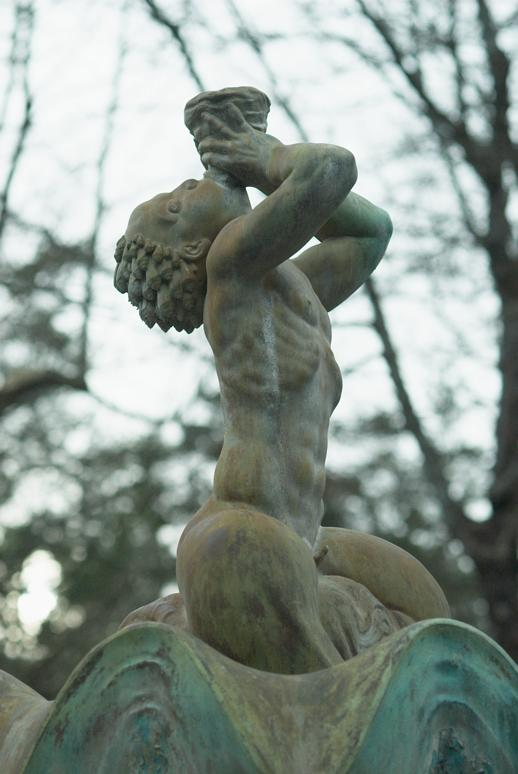

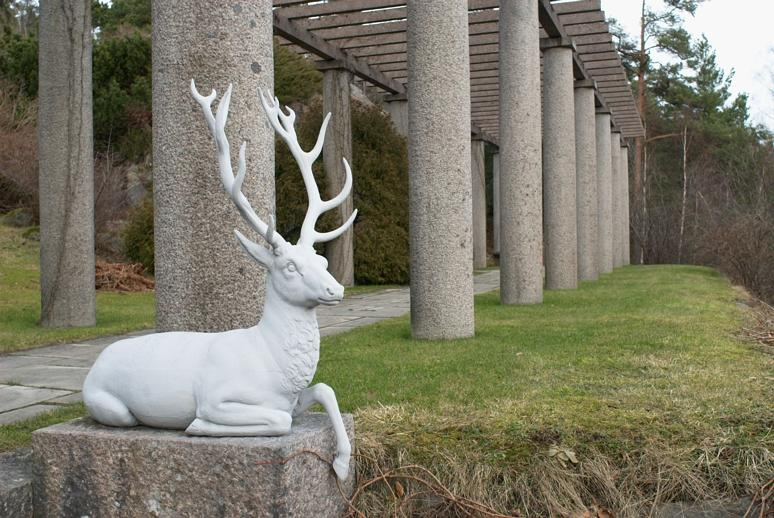

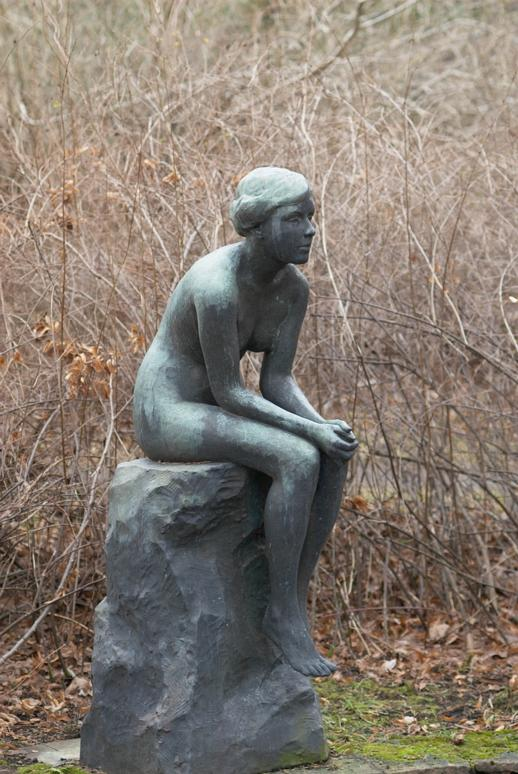

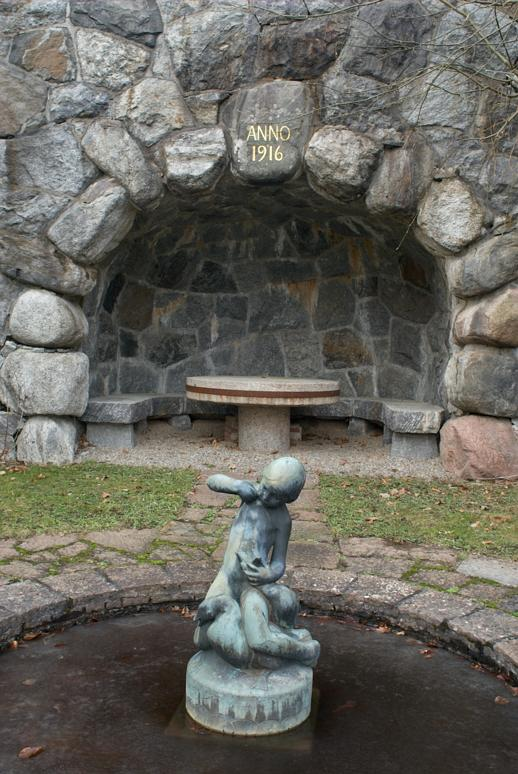

== See also ==
- Berga Naval Base
