= Novax =

Swedish investment subsidiary

Novax is wholly owned subsidiary to Axel Johnson AB investing in growth companies within retail, trade and trade related service and with sales in the range of 100 to 1,000 million SEK.

Novax level of participation varies from sizable minorities to wholly owned subsidiaries.

Novax current investments include among others Filippa K (55%); DesignTorget (100%); RCO Security (60%); Educations.com Media Group (38%); Medius (38%); Concept Motion (33%); Json Handels (29%) and Hyper Island (18%).

== Novax Canada ==
Novax Industries Corporation (Novax) designs and manufactures traffic control products.
Including:

- Transit Signal Priority (TSP) solutions
- Accessible (audible) pedestrian crossing solutions (APS)
- Solid-state electronic traffic control products

Novax is a privately held Canadian corporation located on the west coast.
