= Ax:son Johnson family =

Business family in Sweden

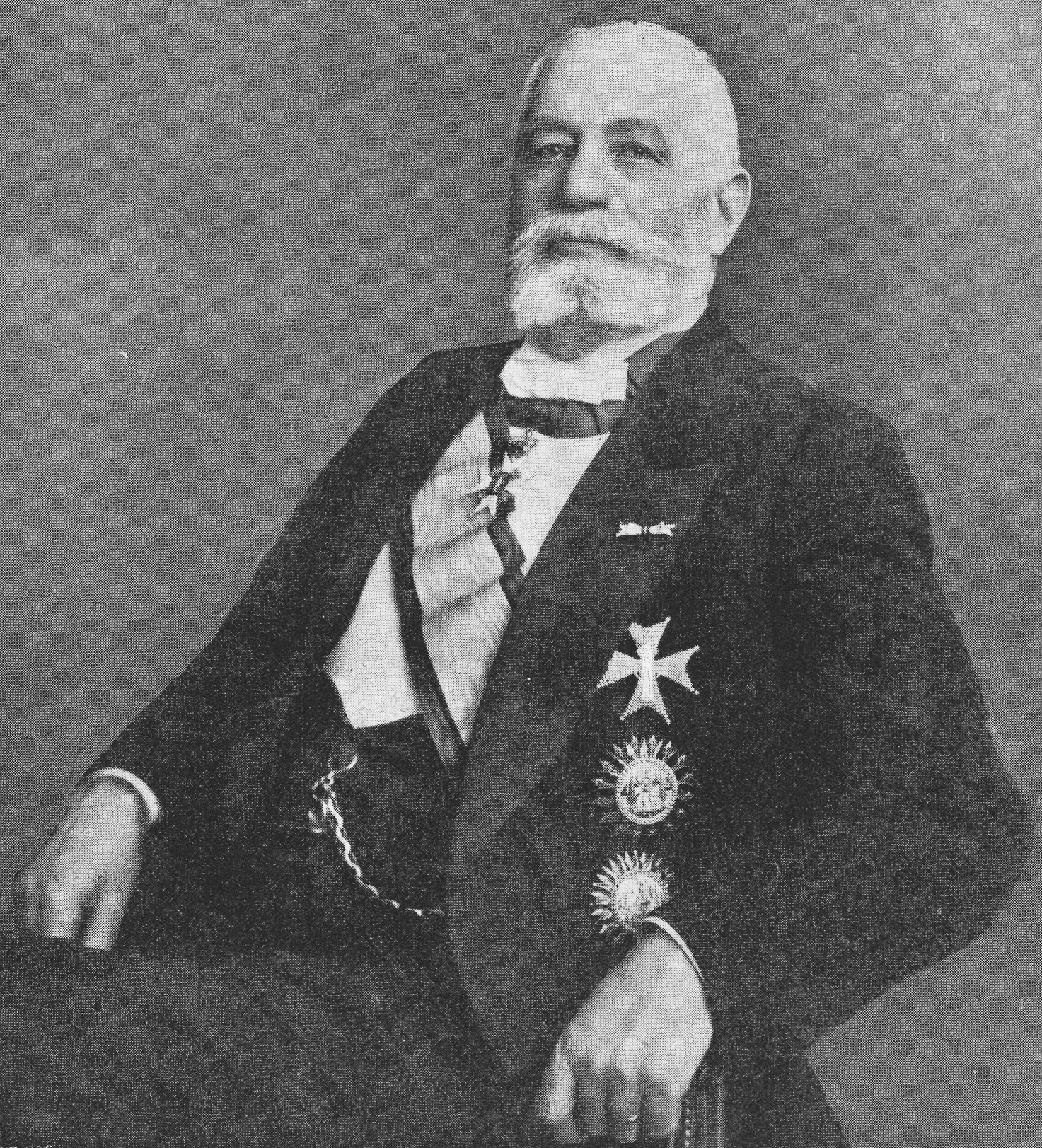
Axel Johnson (1844–1910) in 1909

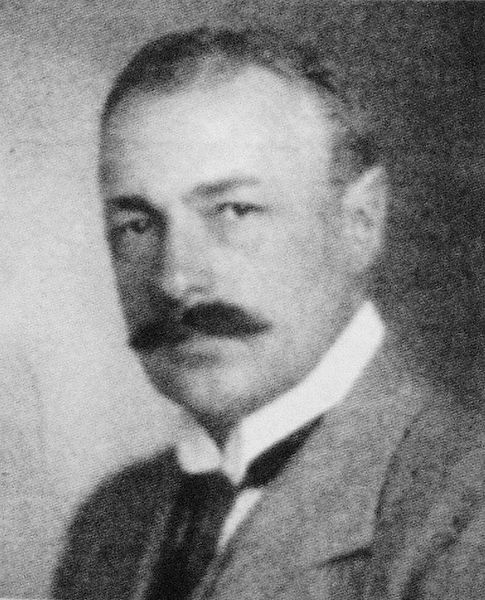
Axel Ax:son Johnson (1876–1958) in 1936.

The Ax:son Johnson family (Swedish pronunciation: [ˈâksɛlˌsɔn ˈjǔːnsɔn]) is a prominent Swedish business family, controlling the Axel Johnson Group and Nordstjernan.

== History ==
In 1873, Axel Johnson founded the trading company A. Johnson & Co., the predecessor of today's Axel Johnson AB.

In 1890, Axel Johnson formed the Nordstjernan shipping company, which expanded rapidly. He managed to break the international coffee monopoly, known as the "coffee conference", a strictly controlled pricing cartel for the transportation of coffee to Europe. Axel Johnson built under favorable external conditions the company that was to form the basis of the Axel Johnson Group, and which was later developed by his son, Axel Ax:son Johnson (1876–1958) and following generations.

== Notable family members ==
Axel Johnson (1844–1910), a son of the businessman and industrialist Carl Johan Johnson, founded the Axel Johnson Group and Nordstjernan.

Notable descendants:

- Axel Ax:son Johnson (1876–1958), son of Axel Johnson, businessman, industrialist and consul general.
  - Axel Ax:son Johnson (junior) (1910–1988), son of Axel Ax:son Johnson, businessman, industrialist and mining engineer.
    - Antonia Ax:son Johnson (born 1943), daughter of Axel Ax:son Johnson (junior), businesswoman.
  - Bo Ax:son Johnson (1917–1997), son of Axel Ax:son Johnson, businessman and industrialist.
    - Viveca Ax:son Johnson (born 1963), daughter of Bo Ax:son Johnson, businesswoman.
- Helge Ax:son Johnson (1878–1941), son of Axel Johnson, industrialist and art patron, owner of Berga Castle
- Harry Ax:son Johnson (1881–1939), son of Axel Johnson, diplomat.

== See also ==
- Axess TV
