= Double colon =

The double colon ( :: ) may refer to:

- an analogy symbolism operator, in logic and mathematics
- a notation for equality of ratios
- a scope resolution operator, in computer programming languages

== See also ==
- Colon (punctuation)
