= Thomas Engström =

Swedish novelist and journalist

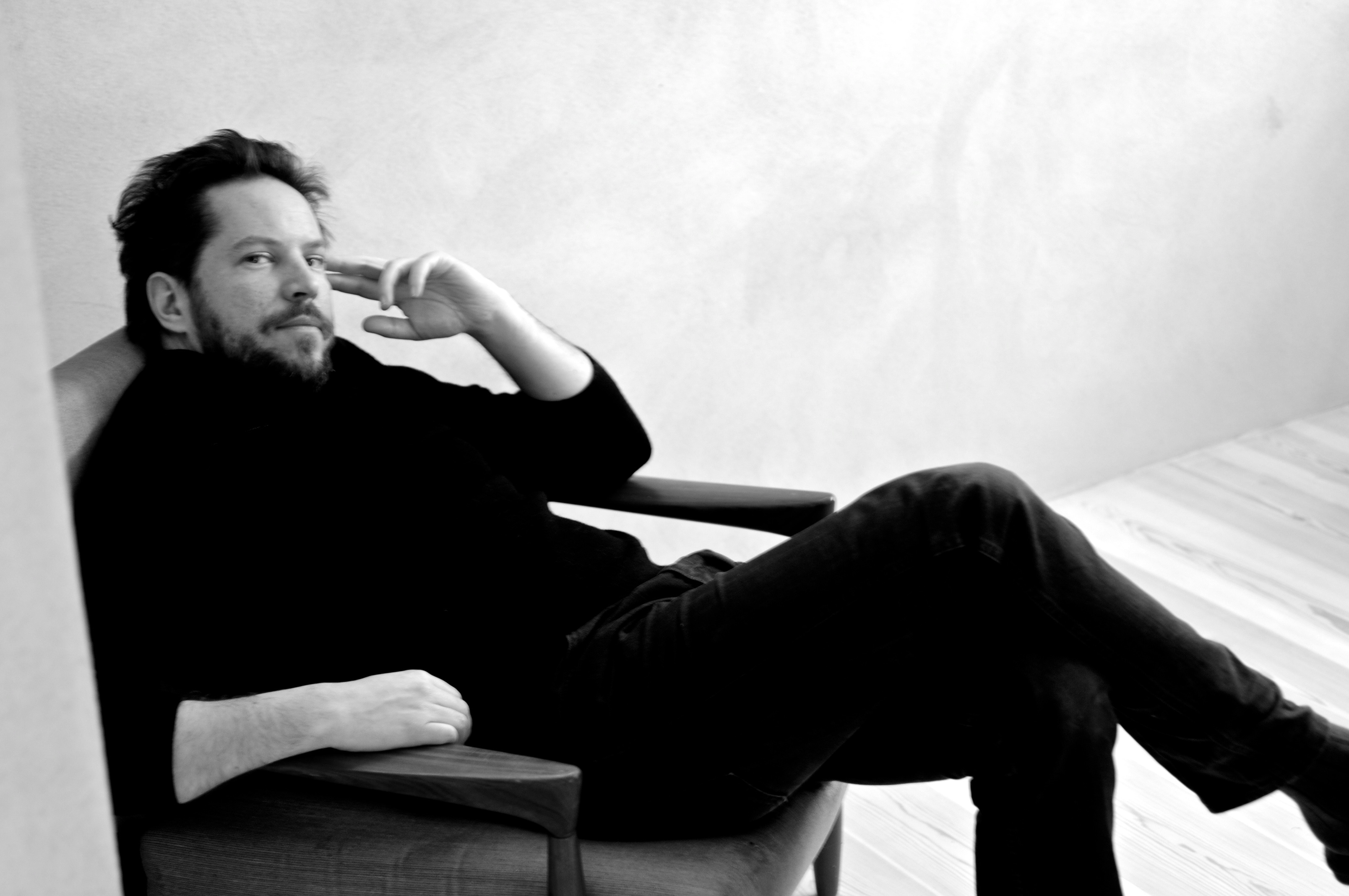
Author Thomas Engstrom

Thomas Engström (born 1975), is a Swedish novelist and journalist. His third novel, West of Liberty, was published in October 2013 by Albert Bonniers Förlag. The book was the first in a series of political thrillers featuring former Stasi agent and CIA freelancer Ludwig Licht. The series explores the harsh realities of today's international political landscape.

The Ludwig Licht series has been sold to a number of countries, including Germany, Poland, The Netherlands, Russia, The Czech Republic and Greece.

During early 2018, the books started to be filmed as an international TV series by, among others, German ZDF Network Movie and Swedish Anagram. International distribution is handled by British ITV. The role of Ludwig Licht is played by Wotan Wilke Möhring.

West of Liberty earned Engström the Swedish Crime Writers' Academy's award for best crime writing debut of 2013.

South of Hell was published in August 2014. It takes place in rural Pennsylvania, as well as Washington, DC. It was nominated for the Best Swedish Suspense Novel of the Year Award.

The third installment, North of Paradise, was published in October 2015. The setting, this time, is southern Florida and Cuba.

In 2017, the series concluded with East of the Abyss, taking place in Ukraine, Armenia and the republic of Georgia. The book was nominated for the Best Swedish Suspense Novel of the Year Award.

== Journalism ==
An award-winning columnist, Thomas Engström has written about international politics and culture in the news daily Svenska Dagbladet and the monthly magazine Axess. He currently is a columnist for the magazine Fokus. He has a law degree from Lund University, including studies at the Raoul Wallenberg Institute of Human Rights.

== Translations ==
Engström has translated some twenty titles from English, including the works of Barack Obama, Mark Bowden, Ian Kershaw, and Walter Isaacson.

== Other ==
In late 2009, Engström co-authored a pan-European Anthology on the state of European democracy, twenty years after the fall of the Berlin Wall – an assignment commissioned by the Danish Foreign Office.

Engström is married to New Zealander Anne Engström (nee Sullivan) who works in the charity sector and politics in London. Anne Engström is of mixed heritage with a Maori father and British mother and has a Bachelor of Arts degree in Politics from Canterbury University, New Zealand . They married in Kalmar, Sweden on 3 March 2023. They live in Royal Tunbridge Wells, England and spend a few months of the year in Småland, Sweden.

== Bibliography ==
- Öster om Avgrunden (East of the Abyss) (2017) Albert Bonniers Förlag
- Norr om paradiset (North of Paradise) (2015) Albert Bonniers Förlag
- Söder om helvetet (South of Hell) (2014) Albert Bonniers Förlag
- Väster om friheten (West of Liberty) (2013) Albert Bonniers Förlag
- Dirty Dancer (Dirty Dancer) (2006) Albert Bonniers Förlag
- Mörker som gör gott (Otto) (2003) Albert Bonniers Förlag
