= Lena Andersson (author) =

Swedish author and journalist (born 1970)

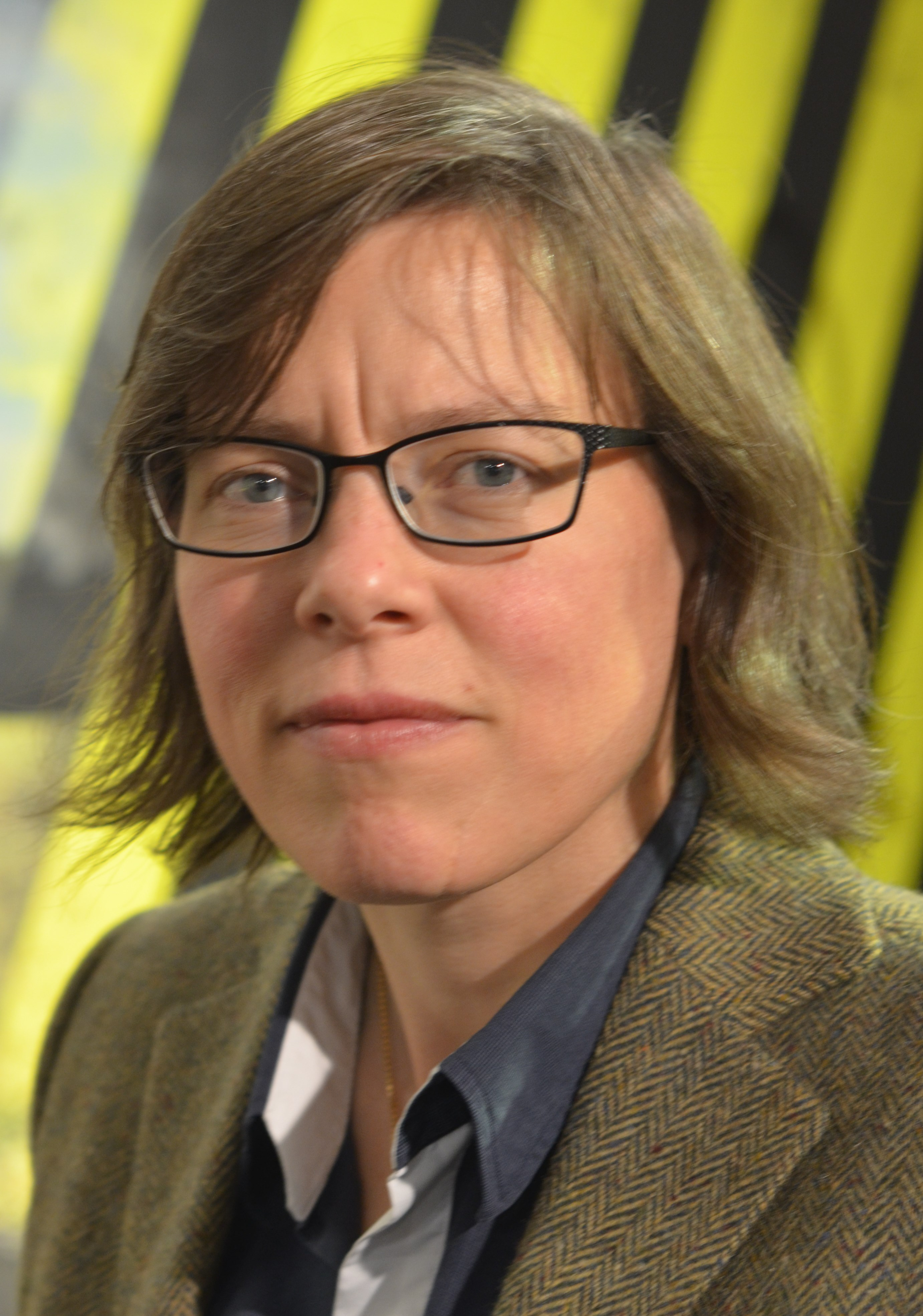
- Born: 1970 (age 55–56); Stockholm, Sweden
- Occupation: Novelist
- Writing career
- Notable work: Wilful Disregard

Lena Andersson (born 1970) is a Swedish author and journalist. She won the August Prize in 2013 for the novel Wilful Disregard. In the same year, the book won her the Literature Prize given by the Swedish newspaper Svenska Dagbladet.

== Bibliography ==
- Var det bra så? (novel, 1999)
- Duktiga män och kvinnor (2001)
- Du är alltså svensk? (novel, 2004)
- Duck City (novel, 2006)
- Slutspelat (novel, 2009)
- Förnuft och högmod (novel, 2011)
- Wilful Disregard (novel, translated by Sarah Death, 2013)
- Ingens mamma (anthology, 2013)
- Utan personligt ansvar (novel, 2014)
- Acts of Infidelity (novel, translated by Saskia Vogel, 2018)
- Son of Svea (novel, translated by Sarah Death, 2022)
- Studie i mänskligt beteende (novel of connected short stories, 2023)
