= Axel Johnson Group =

Swedish family-owned company

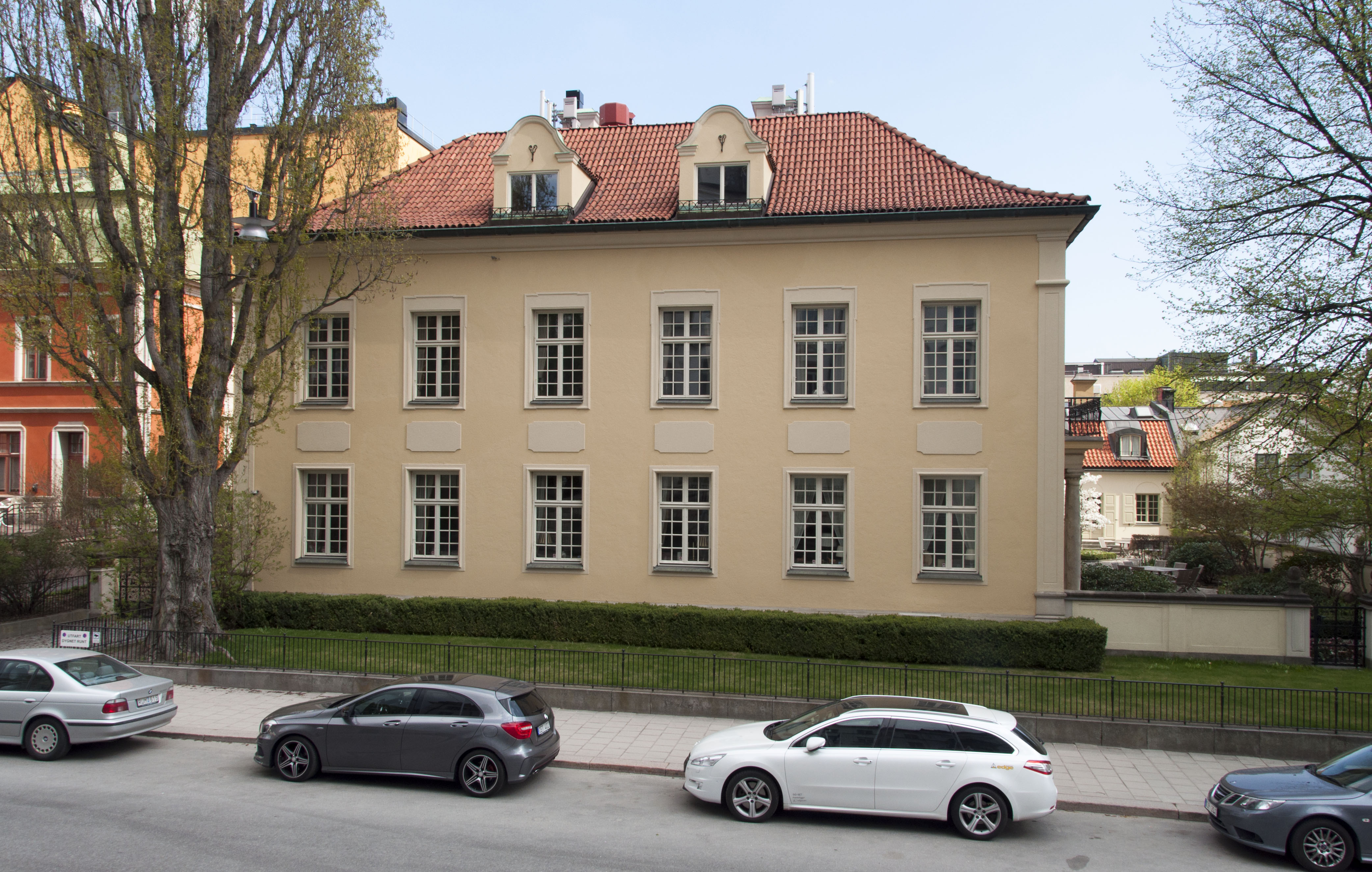
- Native name: Axel Johnsongruppen
- Company type: Limited company
- Industry: Retail
- Founded: 1873
- Founder: Axel Johnson
- Headquarters: Stockholm, Sweden

The Axel Johnson Group is a Swedish family-owned company run by the fourth and fifth generation of family owners. It traces its origins to the trading company A. Johnson & Co, founded in 1873. The group consists of four legally and financially independent groups with a common owner, Antonia Ax:son Johnson and her family. In addition, the group has proprietary interests in Nordstjernan, which in turn has major interests in other companies, including the listed company NCC.

The four companies in the group are:

- Axel Johnson AB
- Axel Johnson Inc
- Axfast AB
- AltoCumulus

== Axel Johnson AB ==
Axel Johnson AB is a Swedish family business that builds and develops trade and service businesses in the European market, with a main focus on the Nordic region. Group companies currently comprise Axel Johnson International, Axfood, Dustin, Novax, Martin & Servera and the solar energy group AxSol.

The wholly and partly owned companies in the Axel Johnson AB group have annual sales of approximately SEK 118 billion and some 27,000 employees (2022).

Axel Johnson AB is one of four independent companies in the Axel Johnson Group, together with property company AxFast, holding company Altocumulus and the US company Axel Johnson Inc. In addition, the Axel Johnson Group has an ownership interest in Nordstjernan. The Axel Johnson Group is owned by Antonia Ax:son Johnson (great-granddaughter of company founder Axel Johnson) and her family.

== AltoCumulus ==
AltoCumulus is an asset management company and family office based in Stockholm and Luxembourg.

== Nordstjernan ==
Nordstjernan is a family controlled investment company with active ownership in Nordic companies. Axel Johnson Group ownership in Nordstjernan amounts to six percent.

== Axfoundation ==
Axfoundation — Antonia Ax: Son Johnson Foundation for Sustainable Development is a detached, non-profit business founded in 1993. Axfoundation works for a more environmentally and socially sustainable society. One of the initiatives that Axfoundation is behind is the establishment and integration initiative, which works for a more open Sweden and increased contacts between new and established Swedes.

== Cooperation with colleges and universities ==
The company participates in the Stockholm Partner Program School of Economics through contributions to the university of support for research and education. In 2018 launched the School of Business Antonia Ax: son Johnson Tutorial program, in order to promote in-depth learning and dialogue between students and teachers. The program is financed by Axel Johnson group through a donation of SEK 50 million in 2017.
