= Nordstjernan =

Private Swedish investment company

Nordstjernan AB
- Company type: Privately held Aktiebolag
- Founded: 1890; 136 years ago
- Founder: Axel Johnson
- Headquarters: Stockholm, Sweden
- Key people: Peter Hofvenstam (CEO), Viveca Ax:son Johnson (Chairman), Antonia Ax:son Johnson (Vice Chairman)

Nordstjernan (Swedish pronunciation: [ˈnûːɖˌɧæːɳan]) is a Swedish investment company. Nordstjernan is a fourth-generation family company controlled by the Axel and Margaret Ax:son Johnson Foundation. The origin is the shipping company Nordstjernan, which was founded in 1890.

== History ==
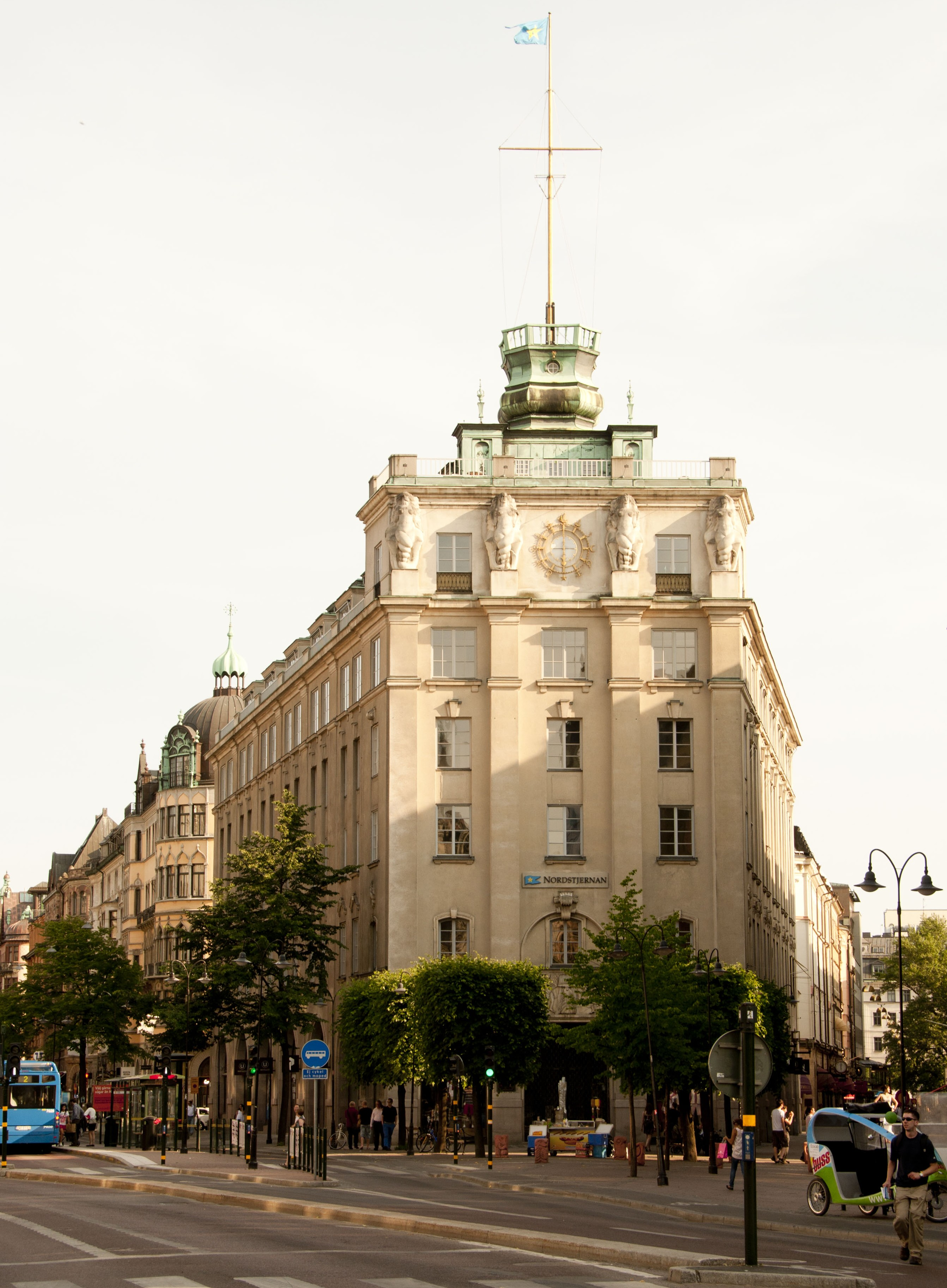
The main office in Stockholm

=== The first generation ===
The founder, Axel Johnson (1844-1910), was a businessman of his time and built up capital through knowledgeable share-trading. In 1890, he formed the Nordstjernan shipping company, which expanded rapidly. His business acumen, combined with personal contacts among the economic elite, meant that there were prerequisites for the development of the business concept in combination with a favourable level of financing.

By the start of the twentieth century, Axel Johnson was already a leading shipowner in Sweden and a pioneer of regular traffic to South America, with the La Plata route. It was Axel Johnson's final business transaction that put Nordstjernan on the map. He managed to break the international coffee monopoly, "the coffee conference", a strictly controlled pricing cartel for the transportation of coffee to Europe. Axel Johnson built, thanks to his talent, will and ambition, combined with favourable external factors, the company that was to form the basis of the Johnson Group, and which was later developed by his son, Axel Ax:son Johnson (1876-1958).

=== The second generation ===
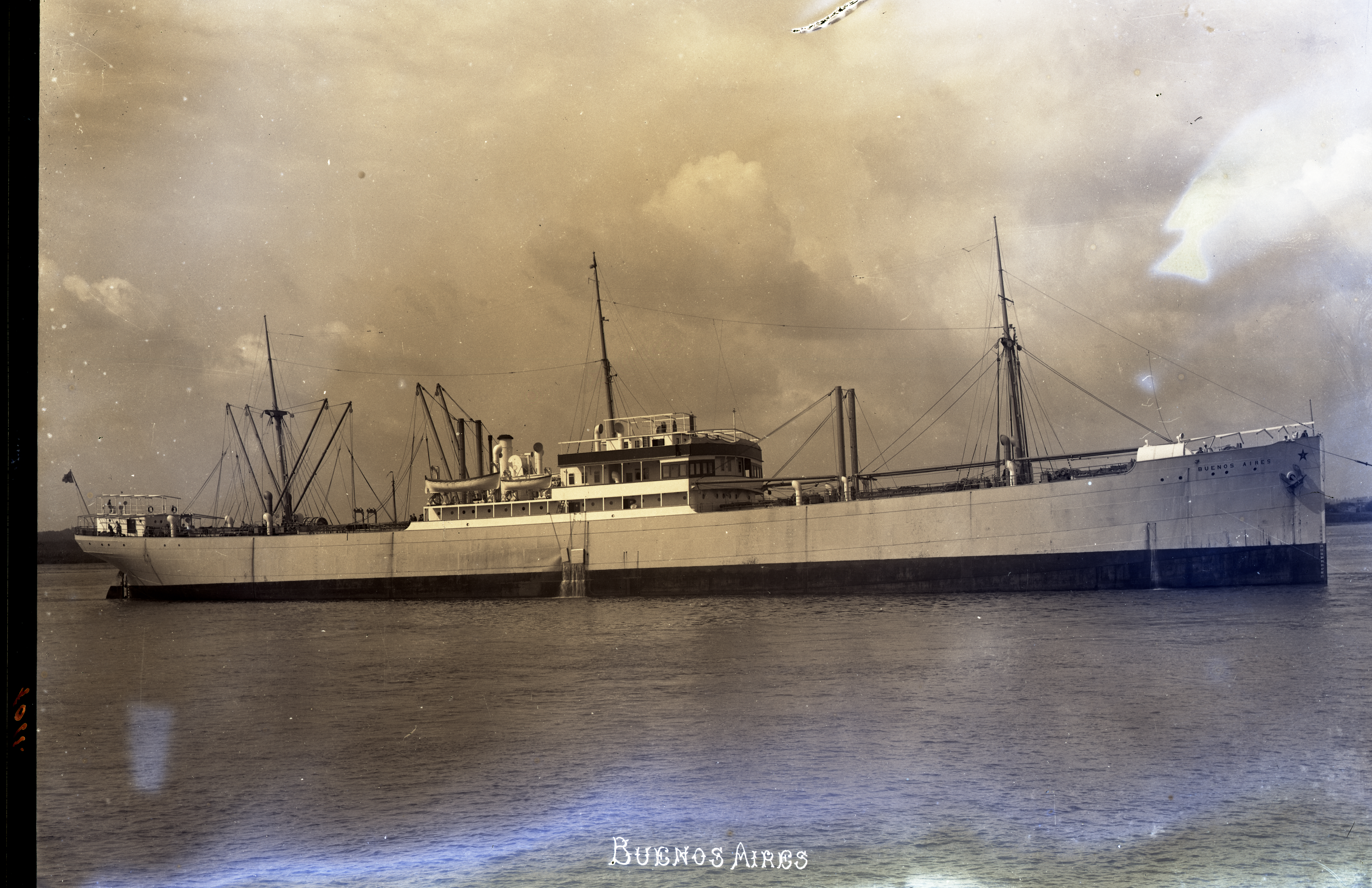
Buenos Aires, a motor ship built for Nordstjernan in 1920

Axel Ax:son Johnson, or the Consul-General as he called himself, took over from his father in 1910, aged 34. New technology was introduced, and old technology was sold before anyone else understood that it had become out-dated, such as the sale of steamships and the purchase of motor ships. Slightly more than 20 years later, in 1936, the Johnson Group was an exponent of modern Sweden. The Consul-General, who was described as "a collector of synergies," already had three major industrial deeds behind him by that time. At the start of the 1920s, Nordstjernan had the world's first diesel-driven ocean-going fleet and the head-start on competitors meant the ability to open new routes, particularly the Pacific Lines to the west coasts of North and South America via the Panama Canal. In 1924, he launched stainless steel in Sweden and, in 1928, he had Sweden's first oil refinery built in Nynäshamn.

The diversification and expansion of the Johnson Group was guided by the integration principle. The aim was to make the Group self-sufficient in goods and services. The trading house took care of the sales (steel) and purchases (coal) for Avesta Jernverk, the shipping company was partially formed to take care of the trading house's transport requirements, the oil refinery supplied the vessels of the shipping company with oil and the Swedish roads with asphalt. The investments formed the core of the empire, which comprised a hundred companies at the time of his death. The Consul-General left behind him Sweden's largest individually controlled group of companies.

=== The third generation ===
The Consul-General's oldest son, Mining Engineer Axel Ax:son Johnson (1910-1988), took over the reins and the further development of the Group. Nordstjernan became a pioneer in container transport. In this, the Mining Engineer was following the traditional Johnson principle, which was self-sufficiency through integration. Fruit companies were purchased, later becoming SABA in cooperation with Saléns, in order to fill the space in newly built refrigerated (reefer) vessels.

Under the leadership of the Mining Engineer, the computer company Datema was started and connections with the Soviet Union were developed and increased. In 1918, Johnson had become the first foreign company to sign a trade agreement with the new communist government. The Johnson Group gradually became one of the Soviet Union's largest single trading partners.

At the beginning of the 1960s, Nordstjernan was expanded and internationalized, like the rest of Swedish industry. This was a consequence of the head-start achieved because Sweden was not involved in World War II. New markets opened up and trade was liberalized. Nordstjernan evolved into a vast conglomerate. The crisis experienced by Sweden in the 1970s was reflected in all of Nordstjernan's sectors. Long-term structural changes and economic cycles caused major losses in most of the businesses operated by the Group - shipping, engineering, oil and steel. The 1970s crisis forced Nordstjernan to break with the sacred principle of complete independence, and the listing of the company began to be discussed with the aim of gaining access to external venture capital.

In 1981, Bo Ax:son Johnson (1917-1997) took over his brother's earlier assignments and functions in the Johnson Group, with the exception of those taken over by Axel's daughter Antonia Ax:son Johnson (1943-), A. Johnson & Co and A. Johnson & Co Inc (now the Axel Johnson Group).

Bo Ax:son Johnson began what is called a "Cultural Revolution" and implemented major changes in Nordstjernan's operations. This meant investment in one core business, the construction sector, which constituted about 30 percent of Nordstjernan's sales in 1985, and was a sector in which the Group had long had an interest in the form of wholly owned companies, including Strå Kalkbruk (1915), Nya Asfalt (1928) and Svenska Väg (1930).

The structural transformation and concentration into one core operation is something of a record in Swedish industry. Some 180 companies and legal entities were sold in the ensuing years. No fewer than five companies were listed on the stock market in the process, including Avesta Jernverk (1987), Databolin (1987), Silja Line (1990), NK (1987 and 1997) and Linjebuss (1992). This streamlining process created the opportunities for NCC, the construction and real estate company, to expand. This company was originally listed as Nordstjernan, but changed its name to NCC following the acquisition of ABV in 1988.

In the 1980s, Nordstjernan was transformed from a closed family company and industrial conglomerate to become a listed Nordic construction and real estate company - NCC. Following the acquisition of SIAB in spring 1997, which was Bo Ax:son Johnson's last business transaction, the aim of becoming the largest, market-leading construction company in the Nordic region had been realized. Nordstjernan remains the principal owner of NCC.

=== The fourth generation ===
Following the death of Bo Ax:son Johnson in 1997, the two cousins Antonia Ax:son Johnson (1943-) and Viveca Ax:son Johnson (1963-) took over the responsibility of Nordstjernan. A new Board of Directors and management team was appointed. Today, the main investment of Nordstjernan is NCC, the second-largest construction company in Northern Europe.

== Key people ==
Peter Hofvenstam (born 1965) is CEO of Nordstjernan AB since 2019.

Viveca Ax:son Johnson (born 1963) is Chairman) of the board of directors since 2007. Antonia Ax:son Johnson (born 1943) is Vice Chairman since 2007.
