= Antonia Ax:son Johnson =

Swedish businesswoman, billionaire (born 1943)

Antonia Ax:son Johnson KmstkVO
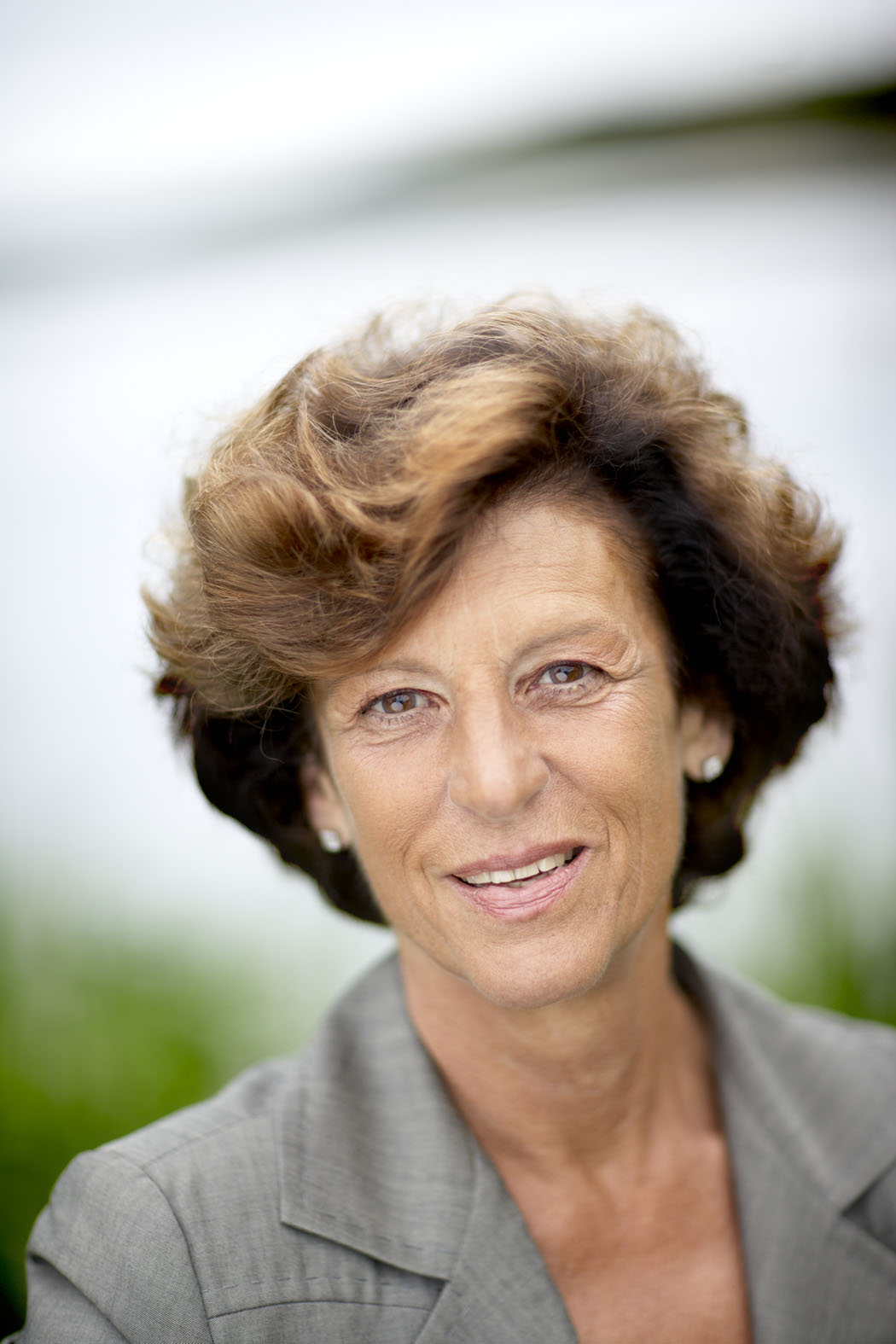
- Born: 6 September 1943 (age 83); New York City, U.S.
- Occupation: Axel Johnson Heiress
- Children: 4
- Parent(s): Axel Ax:son Johnson (junior); Antonia de Souza
- Website: www.axeljohnson.se

Antonia Margaret Ax:son Johnson (Note: Ax:son is an abbreviation of Axelsson.) KmstkVO (Swedish: [anˈtǒːnɪa ˈâksɛlˌsɔn ˈjǔːnsɔn]; born 1943) is the fourth-generation head of the family company Axel Johnson AB, founded by her great-grandfather in 1873. In 1982 she succeeded her father as chairman of the board for Axel Johnson AB, Sweden, and Axel Johnson Inc., Stamford, U.S.

According to Forbes Johnson was the third richest Swedish billionaire in 2013. As of April 2024 Forbes reported her net worth as $10.2B.

The colon in Ax:son indicates a contraction in the Swedish style. The full name is Axelson.

== Education ==
Antonia Ax:son Johnson attended Radcliffe College in Cambridge, Massachusetts, as an exchange student, and she holds a master's degree in psychology and economics from the Stockholm University. She has been awarded the honorary degree of doctor of civil law from Bishop's University, Quebec, Canada, as well as a doctor of humane letters from Middlebury College of Vermont. She also studied in Ibero in Mexico City.

== Wealth ==
Antonia Ax:son Johnson has a net worth of US$10.2 billion, largely inherited and still growing. The Axel Johnson Group is said to be worth in excess of US$11 billion.

== Distinctions ==
- Sweden: Commander Grand Cross of the Royal Order of Vasa, 21 March 2024

== See also ==
- Ax:son Johnson family
