= Regner Leuhusen =

Swedish Army officer

Friherre Regner Leuhusen
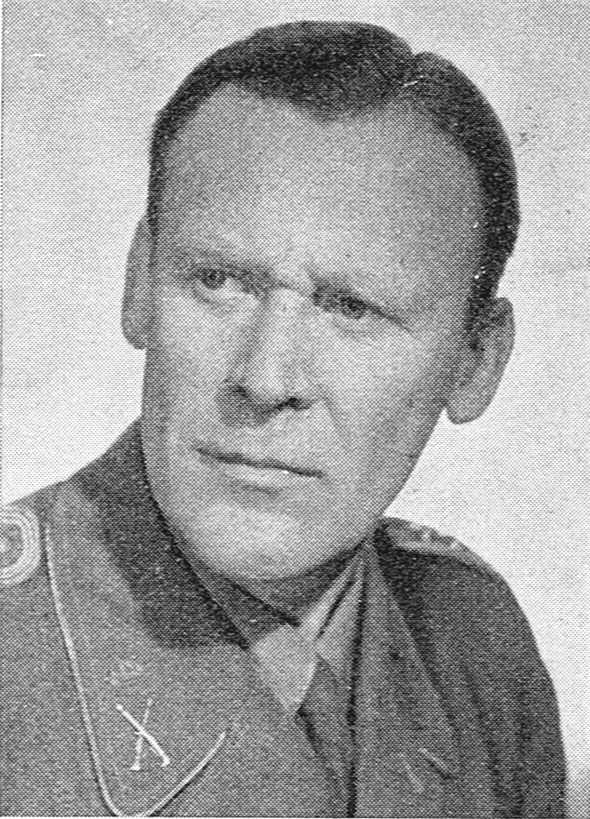
- Leuhusen as colonel
- Born: Regner Niels Carlsson Leuhusen; 22 December 1900; Stockholm, Sweden
- Died: 10 March 1994 (aged 93); Båstad, Sweden
- Military career
- Allegiance: Sweden
- Branch: Swedish Army
- Service years: 1921–1966
- Rank: Lieutenant General
- Commands: Infantry Gunnery School; Värmland Regiment; VII Military District; V Military District

Lieutenant General Friherre Regner Niels Carlsson Leuhusen (22 December 1900 – 10 March 1994) was a Swedish Army officer. Leuhusen served as commander of Värmland Regiment (1951–1953), and as Commanding General of the VII Military District (1957–1959) and the V Military District (1963–1966).

== Early life ==
Leuhusen was born on 22 December 1900 in Stockholm, Sweden, the son of ryttmästare, Friherre Carl Leuhusen and his wife Lizinka (née Sörensen). He passed mogenhetsexamen on 13 May 1919. Leuhusen became an officer candidate in Svea Life Guards on 7 September 1919 and enrolled at the Military Academy Karlberg in Stockholm on 15 October 1920.

== Career ==
Leuhusen graduated from the Military Academy Karlberg on 17 December 1921 and was commissioned as an officer and assigned as a second lieutenant to Svea Life Guards on 31 December 1921. He was promoted to underlöjtnant on 31 December 1923 and to lieutenant on 28 May 1926. Leuhusen became captain in the General Staff in 1935 and he served in Norrbotten Regiment in 1939 and was major at Military Academy Karlberg in 1941. He served as a teacher of land warfare at the Royal Swedish Air Force Staff College in 1941. Leuhusen was major in the General Staff Corps in 1942 and served as head of the Central Department in the Army Inspectorate (Arméinspektionen) from 1942.

He was promoted to lieutenant colonel in 1944 and served in Jönköping-Kalmar Regiment in 1945. He was promoted to colonel in 1947 and was assigned to Svea Life Guards. Leuhusen then served as commander of the Swedish Infantry Gunnery School from 1946 to 1951 and of Värmland Regiment from 1951 to 1953. He was colonel in the General Staff Corps and served as chief of Section II in the Army Staff in 1953. Leuhusen was promoted to major general in 1957 and served as Commanding General, VII Military District between 1 April 1957 and 30 September 1959. He was then Commanding General, V Military District from 1959 to 1966. He retired from active service in 1966 and was promoted to lieutenant general on the reserve list.

Besides his military career, Leuhusen was the King in Council's representative at the Central Board of the National [Swedish] Rifle Clubs (Skytteförbundens överstyrelse) from 1947. He has also been credited by Major General Claës Skoglund with inventing motorized bikejoring (cykeltolkning), based on skijoring, which is a way to pull military bicycles on a wire behind a motor vehicle to move large masses of light infantry faster.

== Personal life ==
In 1933, Leuhusen married Marie-Louise Cervell (1902–1994), the daughter of consul Gustaf Johanson and Anna (née Valentin). They had two children: Carl Herman (1934–2010) and Caroline (born 1938). Leuhusen's brother-in-law was colonel Frank Cervell.

From 1936 to 1963, Leuhusen owned a villa on Kopparbovägen 48 in Kopparbo in Kolmården. He was the owner of Boxholm's manor in Östergötland from 1962.

== Death ==
Leuhusen died on 10 March 1994. He was interred at Båstad's new burial ground, south of St. Mary's Church in Båstad.

== Dates of rank ==
- 1921 – Second lieutenant
- 1923 – Underlöjtnant
- 1926 – Lieutenant
- 1935 – Captain
- 1941 – Major
- 1944 – Lieutenant colonel
- 1947 – Colonel
- 1957 – Major general
- 1966 – Lieutenant general

== Awards and decorations ==
=== Swedish ===
- (Sweden) King Gustaf V's Jubilee Commemorative Medal (1948)
- (Sweden) Commander Grand Cross of the Order of the Sword (6 June 1964)
- (Sweden) Commander 1st Class of the Order of the Sword (5 June 1954)
- (Sweden) Commander of the Order of the Sword (1951)
- (Sweden) Knight of the Order of the Sword (1942)
- (Sweden) Knight of the Order of the Polar Star (1950)
- (Sweden) Knight of the Order of Vasa (1945)
- (Sweden) Knight of the Order of Saint John
- (Sweden) Home Guard Medal of Merit in gold (6 June 1951)
- (Sweden) Landstormen Silver Medal (Landstormens silvermedalj)
- (Sweden) Central Board of the National Swedish Rifle Association's silver medal (Sveriges skytteförbunds överstyrelses silvermedalj)

=== Foreign ===
- (Norway) Commander with Star of the Order of St. Olav (1 July 1964)
- (Denmark) Commander of the Order of the Dannebrog
- Commander of the Order of the Lion of Finland
- (Finland) Finnish commemorative medal Pro benignitate humana

== Honours ==
- Member of the Royal Swedish Academy of War Sciences (1943)

Military offices
Preceded by Sven Ramström	Swedish Infantry Gunnery School; 1946–1951	Succeeded by Wilhelm Reuterswärd
Preceded by Fredrik Grevillius	Värmland Regiment; 1951–1953	Succeeded by Sven Holmberg
Preceded by Hilding Kring	Commanding General, VII Military District; 1957–1959	Succeeded by Fale Burman
Preceded by Sven Salander	Commanding General, V Military District; 1959–1966	Succeeded by Stig Synnergren
