= Sven Salander =

Swedish Army officer

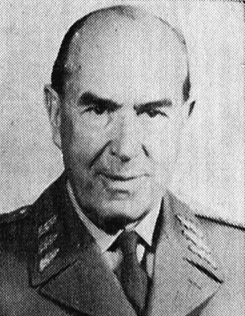
- Born: Sven Philip Salander; 5 July 1894; Stockholm, Sweden
- Died: 31 July 1965 (aged 71); Tjörnarp, Sweden
- Burial place: Norra begravningsplatsen
- Relatives: Pernilla Stalfelt (granddaughter)
- Military career
- Allegiance: Sweden
- Branch: Swedish Army
- Service years: 1913–1959
- Rank: Lieutenant general
- Commands: Norrbotten Artillery Corps; V Military District

Lieutenant General Sven Philip Salander (5 July 1894 – 31 March 1965) was a senior Swedish Army officer. He served as commanding general of the V Military District from 1947 to 1959.

== Early life ==
Salander was born on 5 July 1894 in Hedvig Eleonora Parish, Stockholm, Sweden, the son of Captain Nils Salander and his wife Elsa Hilda Sofia Söderhielm. Salander passed studentexamen in Stockholm in 1911.

== Career ==
Salander was commissioned as an officer in 1913 and received the rank of underlöjtnant and was assigned to Svea Artillery Regiment the same year. He attended the Artillery and Engineering College from 1915 to 1918 and the Swedish Army Riding and Horse-Driving School from 1919 to 1920. Salander served in the Artillery Staff from 1923 to 1930, was promoted to major in 1934 and then served as head of department in the Artillery Staff from 1934 to 1937. He was promoted to lieutenant colonel and served as chief of staff in the Artillery Inspectorate (Artilleriinspektionen) in 1937.

In 1940, Salander was promoted to colonel and was appointed commander of Norrbotten Artillery Corps in Boden. Two years later, he was appointed Inspector of the Artillery. Salander was promoted to major general in 1945 and served ad Acting Commanding General, V Military District based in Karlstad between 1945 and 1947 and then as Commanding General of the same military district from 1947 and 1959 when he retired and was promoted to lieutenant general on the retired list.

Salander undertook military study trips to Germany in 1941 and Denmark in 1945 and has collaborated with articles in Artilleri-Tidskrift and the daily press, etc.

== Personal life ==
In 1926, Salander married Karin Stjerndahl (born 1905), the daughter of district police superintendent (landsfiskal) Oscar Stjerndahl and Emma Person. They had two sons, Nils (born 1927) and Leif (born 1930), and two daughters, Ann-Marie (born 1932) and Agneta (1936–2007). He was the grandfather of the children's writer and illustrator Pernilla Stalfelt.

== Death ==
Salander died on 31 July 1965 in Tjörnarp Parish, Kristianstad County. He was interred on 18 September 1965 at Norra begravningsplatsen in Solna Municipality.

== Dates of rank ==
- 1913 – Underlöjtnant
- 1917 – Lieutenant
- 19?? – Captain
- 1934 – Major
- 1937 – Lieutenant colonel
- 1940 – Colonel
- 1945 – Major general
- 1959 – Lieutenant general

== Awards and decorations ==
- (Sweden) Commander Grand Cross of the Order of the Sword
- (Sweden) Commander of the Order of the Sword (before 1945)
- (Sweden) Knight of Order of Vasa (before 1945)

== Honours ==
- Member of the Royal Swedish Academy of War Sciences (1936)

Military offices
Preceded by August Rehnberg	Norrbotten Artillery Corps; 1940–1942	Succeeded by Fernando Odenrick
Preceded by Axel Rappe	Inspector of the Artillery; 1942–1945	Succeeded by Knut Gyllenstierna
Preceded by Axel Bredberg	Commanding General, V Military District; 1947–1959	Succeeded by Regner Leuhusen
