= Axel Rappe (1884–1945) =

Swedish Army officer

Friherre Axel Rappe
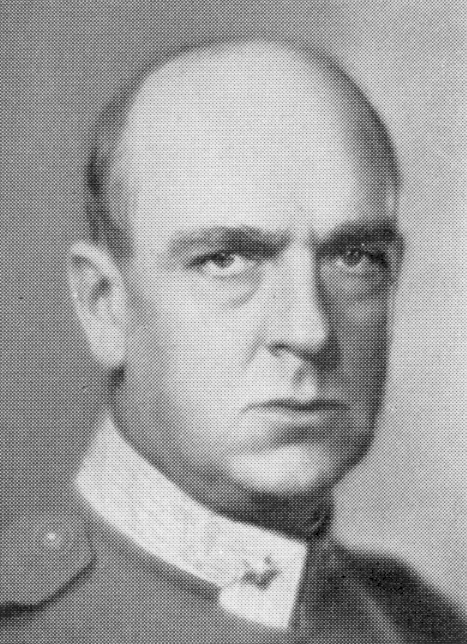
- Born: Axel Oscar Rappe; 22 June 1884; Stockholm, Sweden
- Died: 31 October 1945 (aged 61); Karlstad, Sweden
- Relatives: Axel Rappe (father), Signe Rappe-Welden (sister)
- Military career
- Allegiance: Sweden
- Branch: Swedish Army
- Service years: 1904–1944
- Rank: Major general (Sweden); Lieutenant colonel (Finland)
- Commands: Göta Artillery Regiment; Svea Artillery Regiment; Inspector of the Artillery; Deputy Chief of the Defence Staff; V Military District; I Army Corps
- Conflicts: Finnish Civil War; Battle of Varkaus; Battle of Mouka; Battle of Kinnilä; Battle of Karelia

Major General, Friherre Axel Oscar Rappe (22 June 1884 – 31 October 1945) was a Swedish Army officer. Rappe's senior commands include commanding officer of the Göta Artillery Regiment and Svea Artillery Regiment, Inspector of the Artillery and military commander of the V Military District. He also served in Finland during the Finnish Civil War where attained the rank of lieutenant colonel.

== Early life ==
Rappe was born on 22 June 1884 in Stockholm, Sweden, the son of general, friherre Axel Rappe and his wife Anna (née Sandahl). He was brother of hovsångerska Signe Rappe-Welden.

== Career ==
=== Military career ===
Rappe was commissioned as an officer in 1904 and was assigned as a underlöjtnant to the Svea Artillery Regiment. Rappe attended the Artillery and Engineering College from 1906 to 1907 when he was promoted to lieutenant. He then attended the Royal Swedish Army Staff College from 1908 to 1910 and served as an officer candidate in the General Staff from 1911 to 1913. Rappe served as a teacher at the Artillery and Engineering College from 1914 to 1918 and he was promoted to captain in 1917.

He left the Swedish Army in 1918 to participate in the Finnish Civil War. In Finland, Rappe served in the General Staff of Carl Gustaf Emil Mannerheim and was promoted to lieutenant colonel. He also served as chief of staff of the Eastern Army. Back in Sweden, he was appointed captain in the Svea Artillery Regiment in 1918. He then served as a teacher at the Artillery and Engineering College from 1922 to 1928. In 1927, he served as captain in the General Staff and in 1928 he was promoted to major and was appointed chief of staff of the military command of Upper Norrland. Two years later Rappe was appointed chief of staff of the Eastern Army Division (Östra arméfördelningen) from 1930 to 1931 and from 1931 to 1935 he served as head of the Central Department of the General Staff.

Rappe was appointed lieutenant colonel in the General Staff in 1931 and colonel in the General Staff in 1935. He then served as regimental commander of the Göta Artillery Regiment (A 2) from 1936 to 1938 when he was promoted to major general, and then he served as regimental commander of the Svea Artillery Regiment (A 1) from 1938 to 1940. Rappe served as Deputy Chief of the Defence Staff from 1939 to 1941 and Inspector of the Artillery as well as commanding officer of the Artillery Staff Corps (Artilleristabskåren) from 1941 to 1942. In 1942, he was appointed military commander of the V Military District and in 1944 Rappe was appointed military commander of the IV Military District and Commandant General in Stockholm. However, the nomination was recalled, most likely to keep Rappe on the post as commanding officer of the I Army Corps (Första armékåren).

=== Other work ===
Rappe was a member of the Field Service Regulations Committee 1927 (Fälttjänstreglementskommittén) in 1927 and was its chairman from 1935 to 1937. He served as military expert in the 1930 Defense Commission. Rappe was also a member of the Committee for the Reorganization of the Central Military Administration (Kommittén för omorganisationen av den centrala militärförvaltningen) from 1940 to 1941.

== Personal life ==
On 22 June 1923 in Strängnäs, Rappe married Gurli Matilda Johansson (12 February 1888 in Stockholm – 21 February 1966 in Sköldinge), the daughter of the carpenter Claes August Johansson and his wife Edla Matilda Gustafsson (previously Thulin).

== Death ==
Rappe died suddenly only 61 years old on 31 October 1945 in Karlstad.

== Dates of rank ==
Rappe's dates of rank:

=== Sweden ===
- 8 December 1904 – Underlöjtnant
- 31 August 1907 – Lieutenant 2nd Class
- 9 June 1911 – Lieutenant 1st Class
- 30 December 1916 – Captain 2nd Class
- 11 April 1919 – Captain 1st Class
- 1 January 1928 – Major
- 18 December 1931 – Lieutenant colonel
- 23 June 1935 – Colonel
- 3 November 1938 – Major general

=== Finland ===
- 22 February 1918 – Major
- 12 April 1918 – Lieutenant colonel

== Awards and decorations ==
=== Swedish ===
- (Sweden) Commander 1st Class of the Order of the Sword (6 June 1939)
- (Sweden) Commander of the Order of Vasa (6 June 1944)
- (Sweden) Knight of the Order of the Polar Star (1934)

=== Foreign ===
- (Finland) 1st Class of the Order of the Cross of Liberty with star and sword
- Grand Cross of the Order of the Lion of Finland (1944)
- Commander 1st Class of the Order of the Lion of Finland
- (Nazi Germany) Order of the German Eagle with Star
- (Ottoman Empire) 4th Class of the Order of the Medjidie

== Honours ==
- Member of the Royal Swedish Academy of War Sciences (1932)

== Bibliography ==
- Rappe, Axel (1938). Aktuella försvarsproblem. Offentliga föredrag vid Göteborgs högskola; Göteborgs-serien (in Swedish). Gothenburg: Wettergren & Kerber. SELIBR 1375372.
- Rappe, Axel (1928). Ledningen av östarméns operationer (in Swedish). Helsinki. SELIBR 2670861.
- Rappe, Axel (1925). Civis: Folkets bärkraft och försvaret. [Rubr.] (in Swedish). Stockholm. SELIBR 3064413.
- Rappe, Axel (1923). Sveriges läge: en krigspolitisk studie (in Swedish). Stockholm: Norstedt. SELIBR 1476796.

Military offices
Preceded by Gunnar Salander	Göta Artillery Regiment; 1936–1938	Succeeded by Sune Bergelin
Preceded by Hjalmar Thorén	Svea Artillery Regiment; 1938–1940	Succeeded by Samuel Åkerhielm
Preceded by None	Deputy Chief of the Defence Staff; 1939–1941	Succeeded by Samuel Åkerhielm
Preceded by Sture Gadd	Inspector of the Artillery; 1941–1941	Succeeded by Sven Salander
Preceded by None	V Military District; 1942–1944	Succeeded by Axel Bredberg
