= Oath of allegiance =

Individual oath to a state

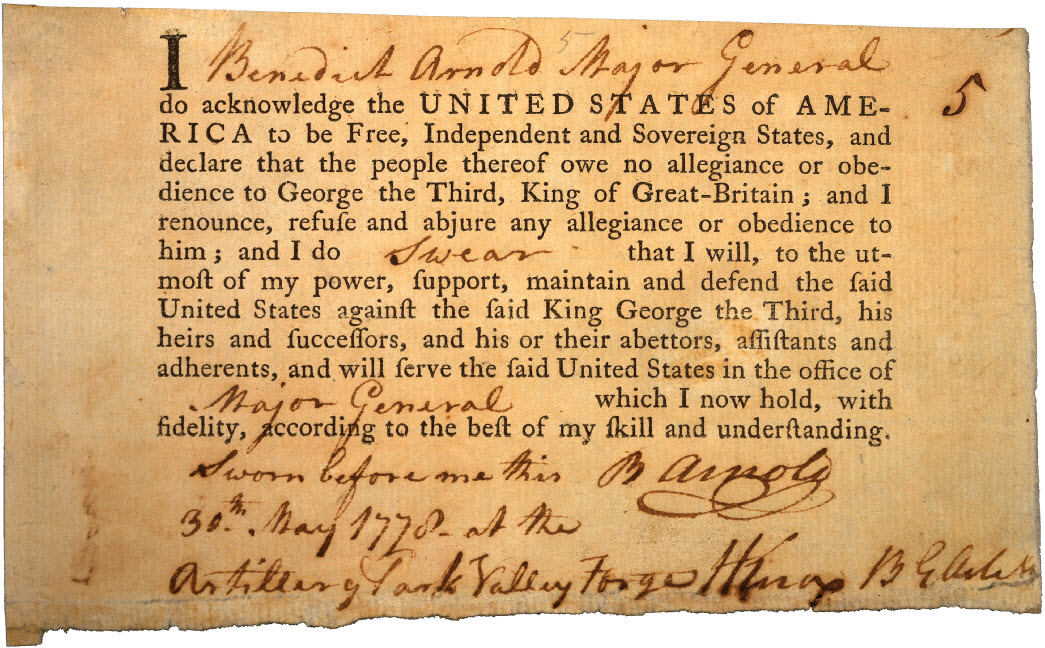
- Major General Benedict Arnold's oath of allegiance to the United States taken on May 30th, 1778, at the Artillery Park, Valley Forge.

U.S. military recruits taking their oath of allegiance

An oath of allegiance is an oath whereby a subject or citizen acknowledges a duty of allegiance and swears loyalty to a monarch or a country. In modern republics, oaths are sworn to the country in general, or to the country's constitution. For example, officials in the United States, take an oath of office that includes swearing allegiance to the United States Constitution. However, typically in a constitutional monarchy, such as in the United Kingdom, Australia, and other Commonwealth realms, oaths are sworn to the monarch. Armed forces typically require a military oath. In feudal times, a person would also swear allegiance to their feudal superiors. To this day the oath sworn by freemen of the City of London contains an oath of obedience to the Lord Mayor of the City of London.

Oaths of allegiance are commonly required of newly naturalised citizens (see oath of citizenship), members of the armed forces, and those assuming public (particularly parliamentary and judicial) offices. Clergy in the Church of England are required to take an Oath of Supremacy acknowledging the authority of the British monarch.

A typical example of an oath of allegiance is that sworn by members of Parliament in the Netherlands:

I swear (affirm) allegiance to the King, to the Charter for the Kingdom of the Netherlands, and to the Constitution. I swear (affirm) that I will faithfully perform the duties my office lays upon me. So help me God almighty! (This I declare and affirm)

In many Commonwealth realms, all that is required is an oath to the monarch, and not the constitution or state. There have been moves in some of the realms to make the oath of citizenship sworn by new citizens refer to the country rather than the monarch. However, the oaths sworn by judges, members of parliament, etc., have not been changed. All of these moves have not succeeded as the King or Queen is the personification of the Canadian, British, or Australian state (or that of any other Commonwealth realm). Allegiance sworn to the monarch is the same as to the country, its constitution or flag. The European Court of Human Rights ruled in 1999 that the oath of allegiance to a reigning monarch is "reasonably viewed as an affirmation of loyalty to the constitutional principles supporting the workings of representative democracy."

== See also ==
- 1997 Constitution of Fiji: Chapter 17
- Bay'ah
- Hitler Oath (Germany between the years 1934 and 1945)
- Loyalty oath
- National Pledge (India)
- National Pledge (Singapore)
- Oath of Allegiance (Australia)
- Oath of Allegiance (Canada)
- Oath of Allegiance (Ireland)
- Oath of Allegiance (New Zealand)
- Oath of Allegiance (Philippines)
- Oath of Allegiance (Sweden)
- Oath of Allegiance (United Kingdom)
- Oath of Allegiance (United States)
- Oath of citizenship
- Oath of office
- Patriotic Oath (Philippines)
- Pledge of Allegiance (South Korea)
- Pledge of Allegiance (United States)
- Pledge of Allegiance to the Philippine Flag
- Rukun Negara
- South African schools pledge
