= Axel Bredberg =

Swedish Army officer (1884–1960)

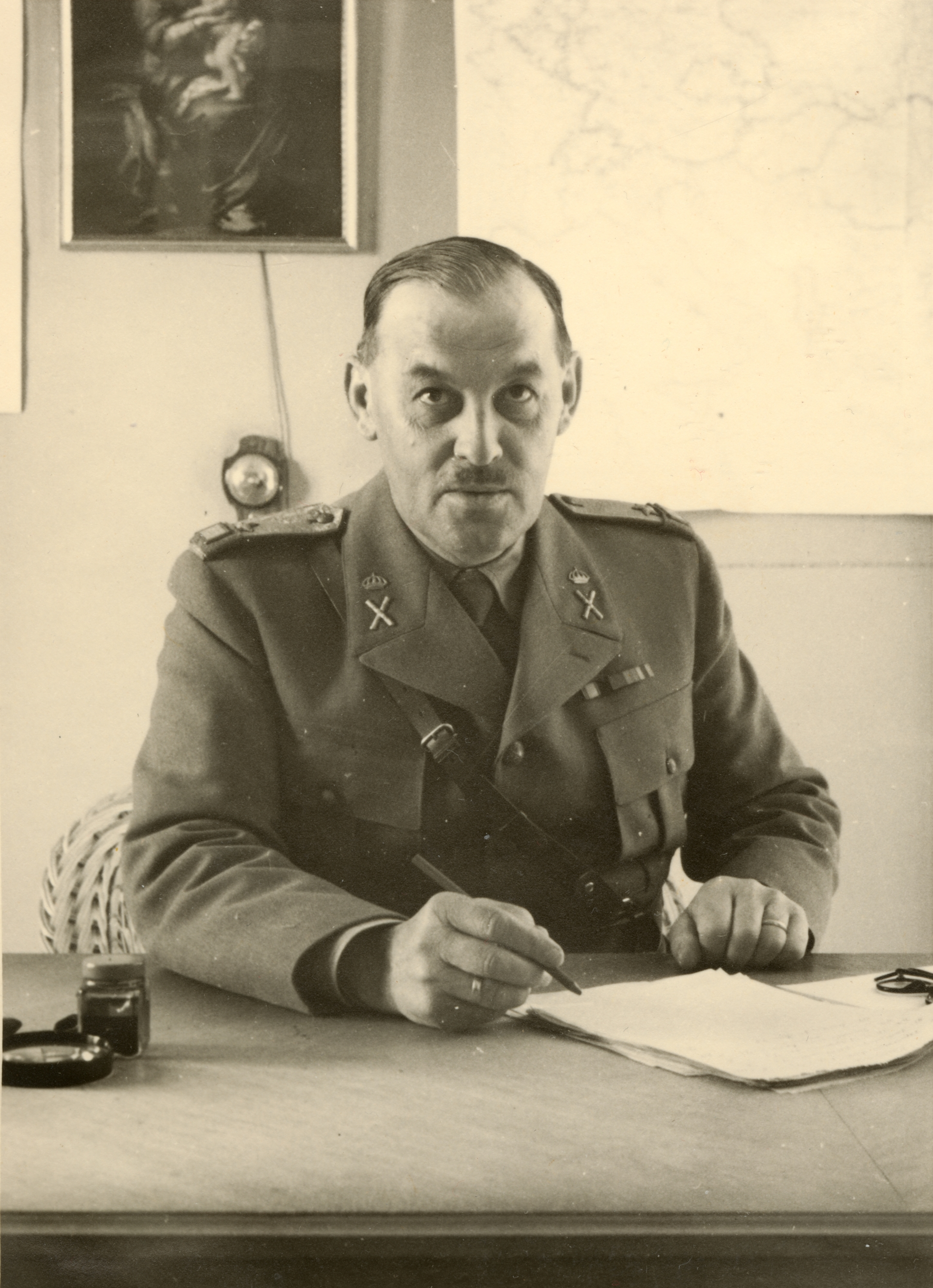
- Bredberg in 1940.
- Born: 24 February 1884; Jönköping, Sweden
- Died: 5 February 1960 (aged 75); Stockholm, Sweden
- Military career
- Allegiance: Sweden
- Branch: Swedish Army
- Service years: 1904–1947
- Rank: Lieutenant General
- Commands: Swedish Army Service Troops; Defence Staff; V Military District

Lieutenant General Axel Bredberg (24 February 1884 – 5 February 1960) was a Swedish Army officer. His senior commands include Inspector of the Swedish Army Service Troops from 1933 to 1942, Chief of the Defence Staff from 1942 to 1944 and military commander of the V Military District from 1945 to 1947.

== Early life ==
Bredberg was born on 24 February 1884 in Jönköping, Sweden, the son of Anders Petter Johansson-Bredberg and his wife Emma (née Svensson). He was the brother of lieutenant colonel Ernst Bredberg.

== Career ==
=== Military career ===
Bredberg was commissioned as a underlöjtnant in the Kronoberg Regiment (I 11) in 1904. He was promoted to lieutenant in 1907 and served as a lieutenant in the General Staff in 1914 and as captain in the General Staff in 1916. Bredberg served as a teacher of tactics at the Royal Swedish Army Staff College from 1918 to 1925 and as captain in the Skaraborg Regiment (I 9) from 1920 to 1922. He served as captain in the General Staff in 1922 and as major there in 1925.

Bredberg was made available for service in the Defense Audit (Försvarsrevisionen) from 1920 to 1923 and to the head of the General Commission of the Ministry of Defence and the Special Committee of the Riksdag from 1923 to 1925. Bredberg also had special assignments: reorganization of the Road and Waterway Construction Service Corps, the Reserve Officer Regulation (Reservofficersförordningen), the Enrollment Regulation (Inskrivningsförordningen) and the Air Defense Commission (Luftförsvarskommissionen) from 1924 to 1930. He was head of the General Staff's Organizational Department from 1924 to 1927.

Bredberg served as major and teacher at the Royal Swedish Army Staff College from 1928 to 1931 and he was promoted to lieutenant colonel in the Swedish Army in 1928 and in the General Staff in 1930. He served in the Älvsborg Regiment (I 15) in 1931, and served as acting regimental commander there from 1932 to 1933. Bredberg was promoted to colonel in 1933 and was appointed Inspector of the Swedish Army Service Troops. He was promoted to major general in 1937 and in 1942 he was appointed Chief of the Defence Staff. Bredberg remained in this position until January 1944. In 1945, Bredberg was appointed military commander of the V Military District. In 1949, he was promoted to lieutenant general.

=== Other work ===
Bredberg was chairman of the Swedish Association of Army, Navy and Air Force Officers (Svenska officersförbundet) from 1936 to 1942, the Försvarsväsendets rullföringsnämnd ("Defense Committee's Enrollment Board") from 1941 to 1942 and the Militära experttjänstekommissionen ("Military Expert Service Commission") in 1942. He was a member of the Inskrivningsrådet ("Enrollment Council") and board member of the Royal Automobile Club in 1942. Bredberg was also a member of the Statens organisationsnämnd ("National Organization Board") in 1944 and chairman of the Försvarets centrala organisationskommission ("Swedish Armed Forces Central Organization Commission") in 1944 and the Sjukvårdskommissionen ("Healthcare Commission") in 1944.

== Personal life ==
In 1908, he married Sigrid Sundling (1885–1969). They were the parents of colonel Bertil Bredberg (born 1909).

== Death ==
Bredberg died on 5 February 1960 in Engelbrekt Parish in Stockholm. He was buried at S:ta Birgitta griftegård in Borås on 20 December 1960.

== Dates of rank ==
- 1904 – Underlöjtnant
- 1907 – Lieutenant
- 1914 – Captain
- 1925 – Major
- 1928 – Lieutenant colonel
- 1933 – Colonel
- 1937 – Major general
- 1949 – Lieutenant general

== Awards and decorations ==
=== Swedish ===
- (Sweden) Commander Grand Cross of the Order of the Sword (15 November 1944)
- (Sweden) Commander First Class of the Order of Vasa (5 June 1943)
- (Sweden) Knight of the Order of the Polar Star

=== Foreign ===
- Commander of the Order of the White Rose of Finland

== Honours ==
- Member of the Royal Swedish Academy of War Sciences (1931)

Military offices
Preceded by Olof Thörnell	Inspector of the Swedish Army Service Troops; 1933–1942	Succeeded by Ivar Gewert
Preceded by Samuel Åkerhielm	Chief of the Defence Staff; 1942–1944	Succeeded by Carl August Ehrensvärd
Preceded by Axel Rappe	V Military District; 1945–1947	Succeeded by Sven Salander
Professional and academic associations
Preceded by Oscar Osterman	Chairman of the Swedish Association of Army, Navy and Air Force Officers; 1936–1942	Succeeded by Einar Björk
