= Oath of Allegiance (Sweden) =

The Oath of Allegiance of Sweden (Swedish: Tro- och huldhetsed, lit. 'Fidelity and Allegiance Oath') was an oath of allegiance to the King of Sweden that had to be taken by all senior public officeholders in Sweden before assuming office. It was abolished when the present-day Instrument of Government came into force on 1 January 1975.

The oath was as follows:

Jag N.N. lovar och svär, vid Gud och Hans Heliga Evangelium, att jag städse skall vara min rätte Konung, den Stormäktigste Furste och Herre, N.N., Sveriges, Götes och Vendes Konung, samt det Kungl. Huset huld och trogen. Jag skall ock med liv och blod försvara det Konungsliga väldet samt Riksdagens rättigheter; allt i överensstämmelse med Rikets Grundlagar, dem jag till alla delar skall lyda och efterkomma. Detta lovar jag på heder och samvete hålla, så sant mig Gud hjälpe till liv och själ.

This in translation becomes;

I N.N. [do] promise and swear, by God and His Holy Gospels, that I always shall be to my rightful King, the Most Potent Prince and Lord, N.N., King of Sweden, the Goths and the Wends, and the Royal House true and faithful. I shall also with my life and blood defend the Royal form of government and the rights of the Riksdag; all in accordance with the fundamental laws of the Realm, which I in all [their] parts shall obey and follow. This I pledge on my honor and conscience to deliver, so truly help me God to life and spirit.

== See also ==
- King in Council (Sweden)
