= Bergslagen Military District =

Former military district in Sweden

- Bergslagens militärområde
- Active: 1942–1991
- Country: Sweden
- Allegiance: Swedish Armed Forces
- Branch: Multi (Sea, Air and Land)
- Type: Military district
- Role: Operational, territorial and tactical operations
- Size: 5 brigades
- Garrison/HQ: Karlstad

Insignia
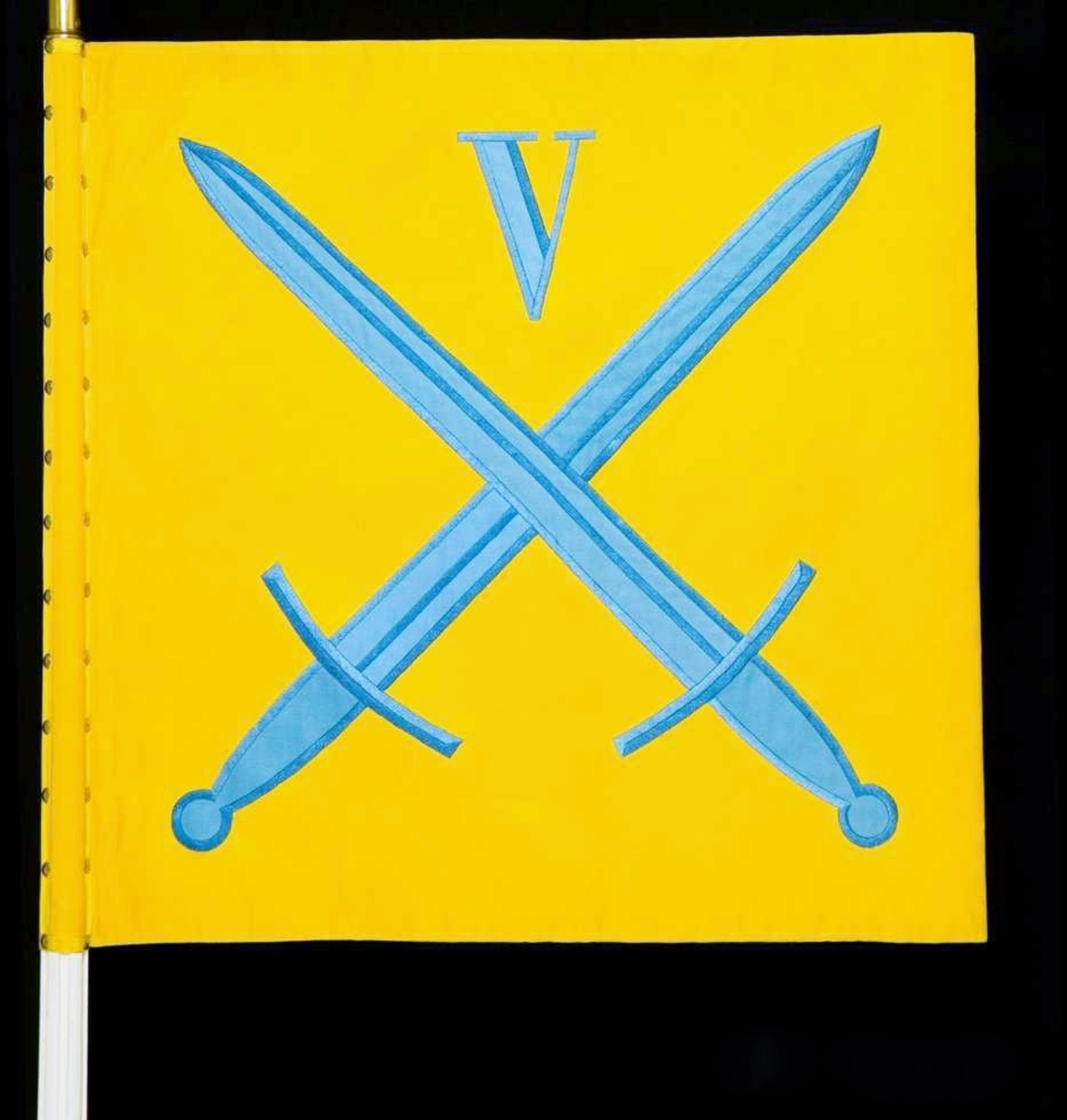
- Command flag

Bergslagen Military District (Swedish: Bergslagens militärområde, Milo B), originally V Military District (Swedish: V. militärområdet) was a Swedish military district, a command of the Swedish Armed Forces that had operational control over the informal Bergslagen region, for most time of its existence corresponding to the area covered by the counties of Värmland, Örebro and Kopparberg (now Dalarna County). The headquarters of Milo B were located in Karlstad.

== History ==
Milo B was created in 1966 along with five other military districts as part of a reorganisation of the administrative divisions of the Swedish Armed Forces. It can be seen as the successor of V Military District (V. militärområdet) created in 1942, but that did not have the same tasks as Milo B. The military district consisted of the land covered by the above-mentioned counties. In 1991, the number of military districts of Sweden was decreased to five, and as a consequence of that, Milo B was merged with Eastern Military District (Milo Ö) to create a new military district, Middle Military District (Milo M).

== Units 1989 ==
In peacetime the Bergslagen Military District consisted of the following units, which were training recruits for wartime units:

- Bergslagen Military District (Milo B), in Karlstad
  - I 2/Fo 52 – Värmland Regiment / Värmland Defense District, in Karlstad
  - I 3/Fo 51 – Life Regiment Grenadiers / Örebro Defense District, in Örebro
  - I 13/Fo 53 – Dalarna Regiment / Kopparberg Defense District, in Falun
  - A 9 – Bergslagen Artillery Regiment, in Kristinehamn
  - ArtSS - Artillery School Training Center, in Älvdalen

In wartime the Bergslagen Military District would have activated the following major land units, as well as a host of smaller units:

- IB 2 - Värmland Brigade, in Karlstad, a Type 77 infantry brigade based on the I 2 - Värmland Regiment
- IB 3 - Life Brigade, in Örebro, a Type 66M infantry brigade based on the I 3 - Life Regiment Grenadiers
- NB 13 - Dalarna Brigade, in Falun, a Type 85 Norrland Brigade (optimized for arctic/winter warfare) based on the I 13 - Dalarna Regiment
- IB 33 - Närke Brigade, in Örebro, a Type 77 infantry brigade based on the I 3 - Life Regiment Grenadiers
- IB 43 - Kopparberg Brigade, in Falun, a Type 66M infantry brigade based on the I 13 - Dalarna Regiment

== Heraldry and traditions ==
=== Coat of arms ===
The coat of arms of the Bergslagen Military District Staff 1983–1991. Blazon: "Azur, an erect sword with the area letter (B - Bergslagen) surrounded by an open chaplet of oak leaves, all or."

== Commanding officers ==
=== Military commanders ===
- 1942–1944: Axel Rappe
- 1945–1947: Axel Bredberg
- 1944–1945: Bertil Uggla (acting)
- 1945–1947: Sven Salander (acting)
- 1947–1959: Sven Salander
- 1959–1966: Regner Leuhusen
- 1966–1967: Stig Synnergren
- 1967–1973: Stig Löfgren
- 1973–1979: Sigmund Ahnfelt
- 1979–1983: Gösta Hökmark
- 1983–1991: Bengt Tamfeldt

=== Deputy military commanders ===
- 1942–1944: Anders Bergquist
- 1945–1951: Harald Hægermark

=== Chiefs of Staff ===
- 1942–1944: Gustav Åkerman
- 1944–1949: Börje Furtenbach
- 1949–1954: Sten Langéen
- 1954–1960: Allan Månsson
- 1960–1963: Bo Sandmark
- 1963–1966: Åke Lundberg
- 1966–1968: Karl Eric Holm
- 1966–1968: Gunnar Nordlöf (acting)
- 1968–1972: Gunnar Nordlöf
- 1972–1974: Karl-Gösta Lundmark
- 1974–1984: Sven Werner
- 1984–1986: Percurt Green
- 1986–1987: Bertel Österdahl
- 1987–1989: Lars-Olof Strandberg
- 1989–1990: Bernt Östh
- 1990–1991: Vacant

== Names, designations and locations ==
Name	Translation	From		To
V. militärområdet	V Military District	1942-10-01	–	1966-09-30
Bergslagens militärområdet	Bergslagen Military District	1966-10-01	–	1991-06-30
Designation		From		To
V. Milo		1942-10-01	–	1966-09-30
Milo B		1966-10-01	–	1991-06-30
Location		From		To
Stockholm Garrison		1942-07-06	–	1942-09-30
Karlstad Garrison		1942-10-01	–	1991-06-30

== See also ==
- Military district (Sweden)
