= King in Council (Sweden) =

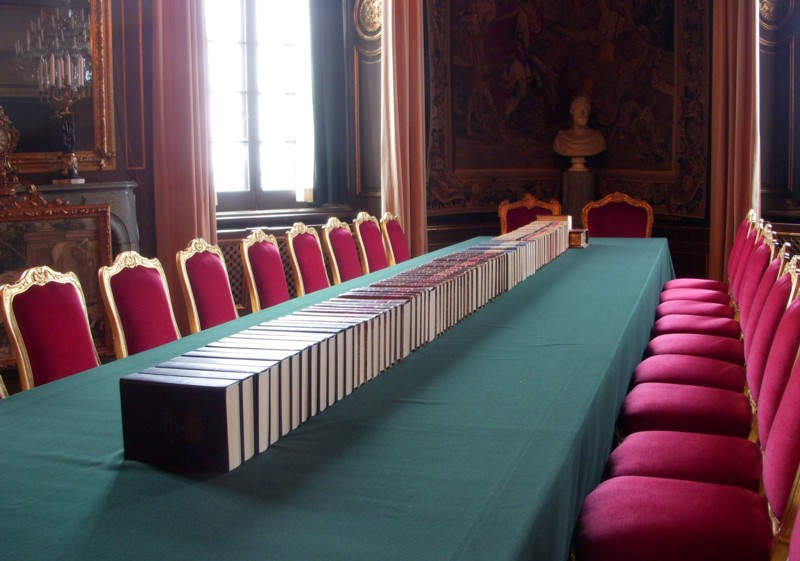
The Council Room (Konseljsalen) at Stockholm Palace in 2011

King in Council, or Royal Majesty, (most formally Konungen i Statsrådet, but a term for it most often used in legal documents was Kunglig Majestät or short form Kungl.Maj:t or K.M:t. in Swedish) was a term of constitutional importance that was used in Sweden before 1975 when the 1974 Instrument of Government came into force.

Royal Majesty denoted several functions, but most importantly, it was the commonly used term that designated the supreme executive authority under the 1809 Instrument of Government: where the King made all decisions of state in the presence of his cabinet ministers. The 1974 Instrument of Government removed the Monarch from all exercise of formal political powers and created its successor: the Government (Swedish: Regeringen) chaired and led in all aspects by the Prime Minister.

== History of the term Kunglig Majestät ==
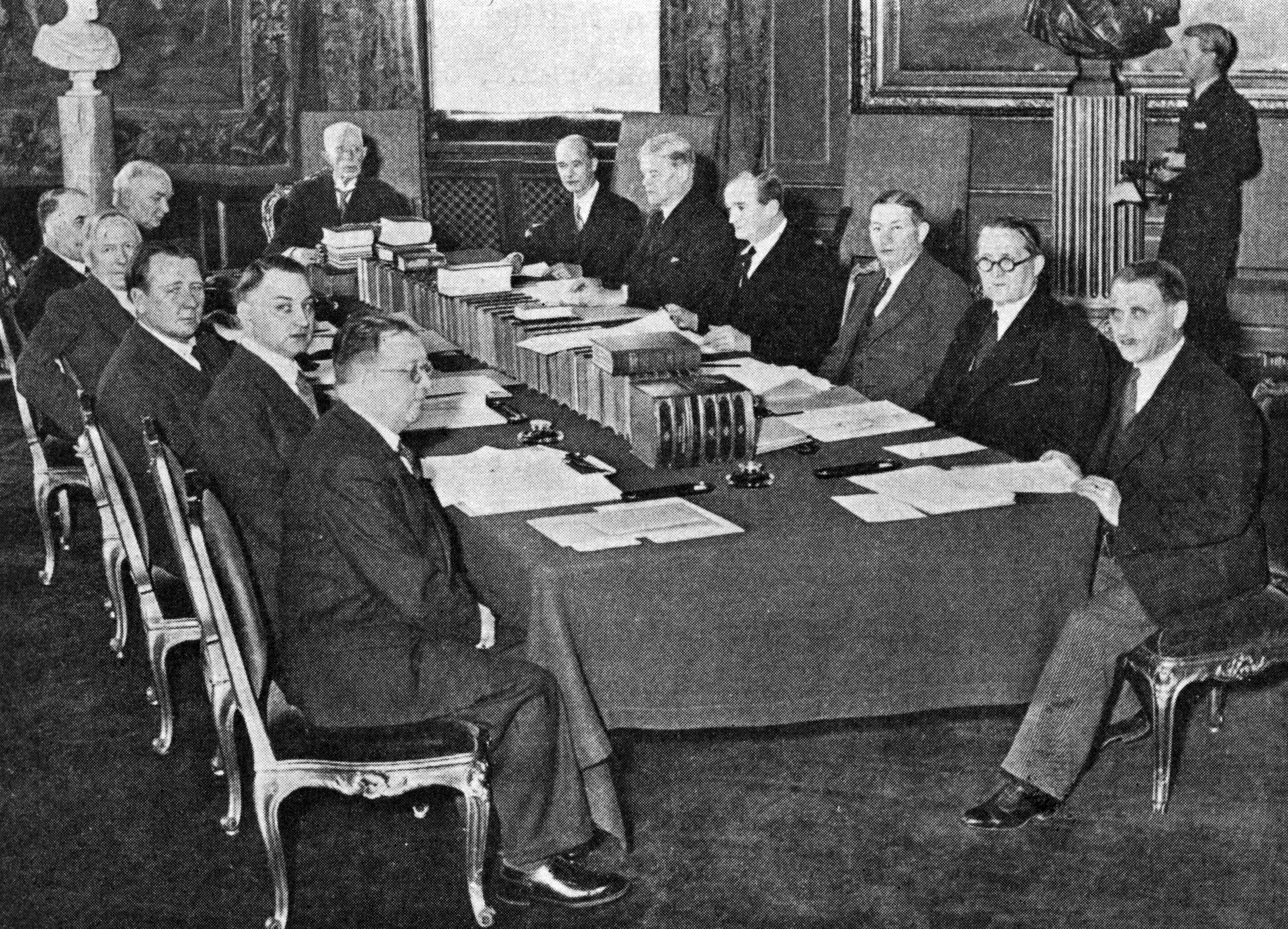
The King in council in 1938. In the back is Gustav V.

The term Kunglig Majestät was earliest in use in Sweden in the 16th century, when the King of Sweden and other kings in Europe began to use the title Majesty, which only the Holy Roman Emperor earlier used. The prefix "Royal" was probably added to differ the title from the Imperial Majesty.

Originally the term Kunglig Majestät therefore referred to the Monarch personally but later only to him (her) as a Sovereign in the Privy Council (Council of State) (Swedish: Statsrådet "Council of State", before 1789 Riksrådet "Council of the Realm").

Most commonly, decisions in the council required the king's formal participation. But when the king was away in other countries, or in remote parts within the country, the Council of State could reign in his name (sections 39–43 in the Instrument of Government 1809). After 1863, the heir apparent, or if he was prevented, the nearest in line to the throne, could reign as Regent (Swedish: Regent) in the king's name. When there was no person in line to the throne available, the Council of State alone again could reign in the king's or the crown's name. The same rules are today used in the new Instrument of Government when the king is unable to fulfil his duties, but the title now is riksföreståndare, instead of Regent. "Riksföreståndare" is a historic Swedish title with medieval roots.

The term Kunglig Majestät was also used by three courts acting on the king's behalf and using the king's seal according to section 23 in the 1809 Instrument of Government. This was a remnant from the Judicial committee – Justitierevisionen ("the Justice revision") of the Privy Council or the Council of the Realm (Swedish: Riksrådet), before the Supreme Court was established in 1789.

The different uses of the term Kunglig Majestät were thus:

- Kungl. Maj:t i Statsrådet ("The King in the Council of State"),
- Kungl. Maj:t i kommandokonselj ("The King in the 'Command Council' "), i.e. with military advisers (mostly the Minister for Defence) from the Ministry of Defence (Swedish: Försvarsdepartementet)
- Kungl. Maj:t i Högsta Domstolen ("The King in the Supreme Court)
- Kungl. Maj:t i Regeringsrätten ("The King in the Supreme Administrative Court")
- Kungl. Maj:t i Kammarrätten ("The King in the Administrative High Court")

== Current usage ==
Today, with the exception of remnants of previous usage, the term Royal Majesty is at present in Sweden only used for Royal orders of knighthood, Kunglig Majestäts Orden.

== See also ==
- History of Sweden
- Oath of Allegiance (Sweden)
- Privy Council of Sweden
- Royal Order of the Seraphim
- Conseil du Roi (historical French counterpart)
