= South African schools pledge =

Oath of allegiance for South African schools

In February 2008 the South African government started a public participation process to create a pledge (or oath) of allegiance to be recited daily by schoolchildren. The draft pledge was based on the preamble of the Constitution of South Africa.

== Draft pledge ==
The first draft of the pledge reads as follows:

We the youth of South Africa
Recognising the injustices of our past,
Honour those who suffered and sacrificed for justice and freedom.
We will respect and protect the dignity of each person,
And stand up for justice
We sincerely declare that we shall uphold the rights and values of our Constitution
And promise to act in accordance with the duties and responsibilities
that flow from these rights.
ǃKE E꞉ ǀXARRA ǁKE
Nkosi Sikelel' iAfrika

== Criticism ==
The description of past injustices has been the focus of early controversy. Opposition party the Freedom Front Plus describing the pledge as an attempt by the African National Congress to instill a "permanent guilty complex" in schoolchildren. Other criticism has centered on the wording rather than the intention of the draft pledge.
