= Kapten =

Swedish company grade officer rank

Kapten (English: Captain in the Swedish Army/Air Force, Lieutenant in the Navy) is a company grade officer rank. In the army/airforce, it ranks above lieutenant and below major. In the navy, it ranks above sub-lieutenant and below lieutenant commander. It is equivalent to the specialist officers rank of förvaltare. The rank has been used in Sweden since the Middle Ages.

== Army/Air Force/Navy ==
Captain Kapten
- Country: Sweden
- Service branch: Army; Air Force; Navy (Amphibious Corps)
- Abbreviation: Kn (Swedish), Capt (English)
- Rank: Captain
- NATO rank code: OF-2
- Non-NATO rank: O-3
- Next higher rank: Major
- Next lower rank: Lieutenant
- Equivalent ranks: Lieutenant (navy); Ryttmästare (cavalry); Förvaltare

Kapten (captain) is a rank in the Swedish Army, Swedish Air Force and in the Swedish Navy (Coastal Artillery 1902–2000, Amphibious Corps 2000–present).

=== History ===
A kapten (captain) usually commanded an infantry company or an artillery battery. The name appeared quite early in the Middle Ages and then applied to the highest commander in an area, a city etc. With the standing armies, which began to be established in the latter half of the 15th century, it was the name of the commander of a unit in both the infantry and the cavalry, which unit was first called company, then fana and from the latter half of the 16th century company again, whose strength was then still far less than before. The captains of the Swedish Coastal Artillery corresponded to the kapten (captain) of the army and kapten (lieutenant) of the navy.

=== Duties ===
A captain in the army serves in three areas, as a commanding officer, as a staff officer and as an instruction officer, at skill levels B (Intermediate), C (Advanced) and D (Expert). Captain in the Amphibious Corps works as a commander, for example as platoon leader for advanced platoon or as deputy company commander and in exceptional cases company commander. In addition to the army requiring a completed tactical course Army (TakA) for a future captain, the focus is on creating an officer who is skilled in, for example, leading combat training with his own company (within the battalion) and competent to work as a company commander or staff officer. Common is that the individual should be able to work as a teacher in officer training. The requirement for service is at least two years as a lieutenant.

=== Promotion ===
According to Chapter 2, Section 1 of FFS 2018:7, a person who is eligible for promotion has served in the Swedish Armed Forces to such an extent that assessment of suitability, knowledge and skills could be carried out, is deemed suitable for promotion, possesses the knowledge and skills required for the higher rank, and meets time requirements according to Section 2 (must have held the rank for at least two years). For promotion from lieutenant to captain, it is only required that the lieutenant is promotable according to Chapter 2, Section 1. For a lieutenant who has completed the Swedish Armed Forces' pilot training, promotion may only take place if the lieutenant has an academic degree at the undergraduate level.

Promotion of captain to major may take place when the captain has completed applicable promotion training with approved results. After completing a tactical staff course at the Swedish Defence University, a captain who is OFSK may only be promoted to major with a passing grade if the position is within the functional area where the captain's special competence is located, and if the position's rank code is OF 3. Responsible head of promotion to captain is the unit commander.

In the case of reserve officers, promotion of lieutenant to captain may take place if the lieutenant holds an academic degree at the undergraduate level, or at least 180 credits if the program includes more than 180 credits. Promotion of captain to major may take place when the captain has completed applicable promotion training with approved results.

=== Rank insignia ===
==== Collar patches ====
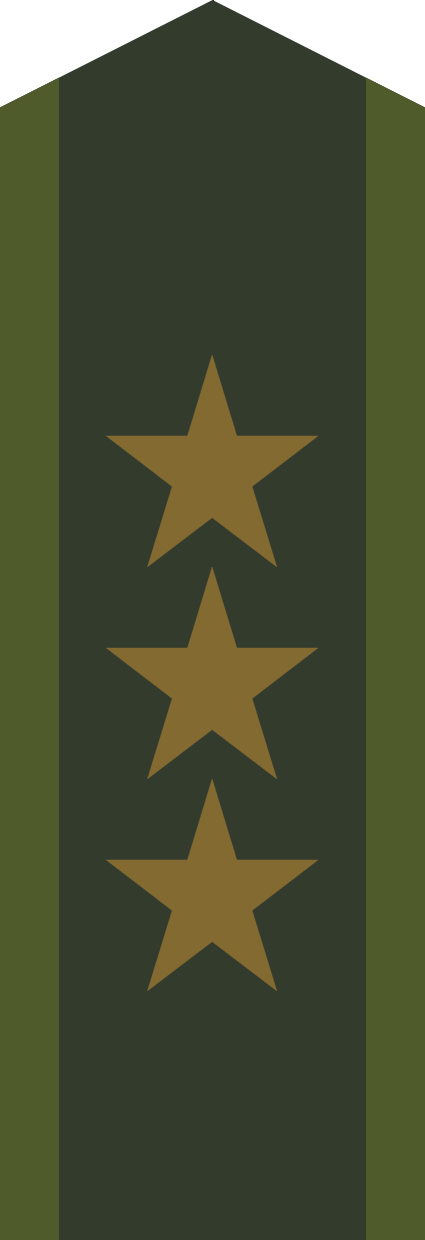
Collar patch m/58 for a captain

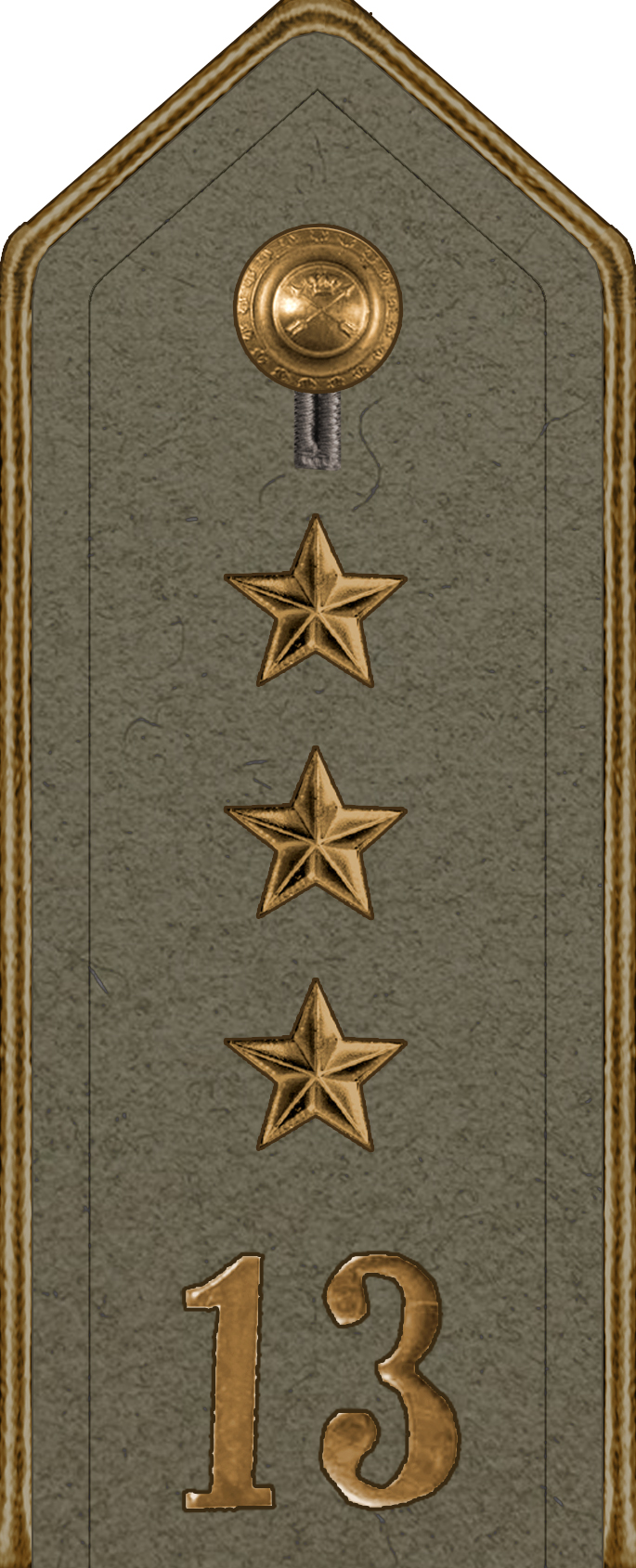
Collar patch

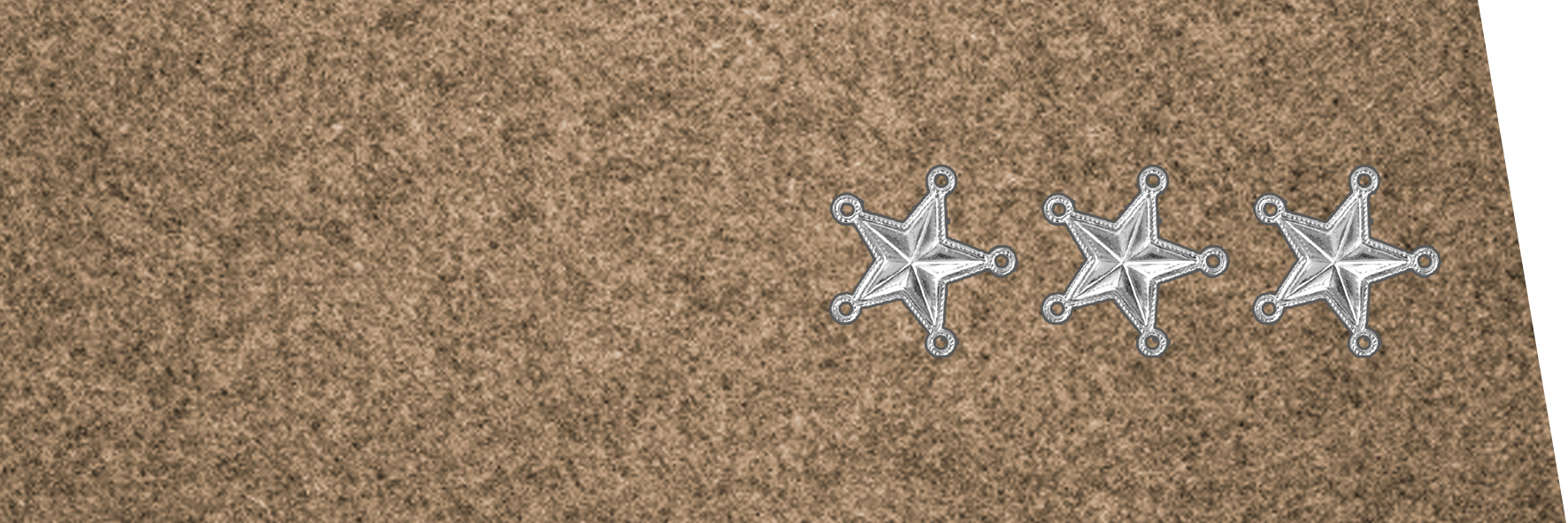
Collar patch

==== Shoulder marks ====
===== Air Force =====
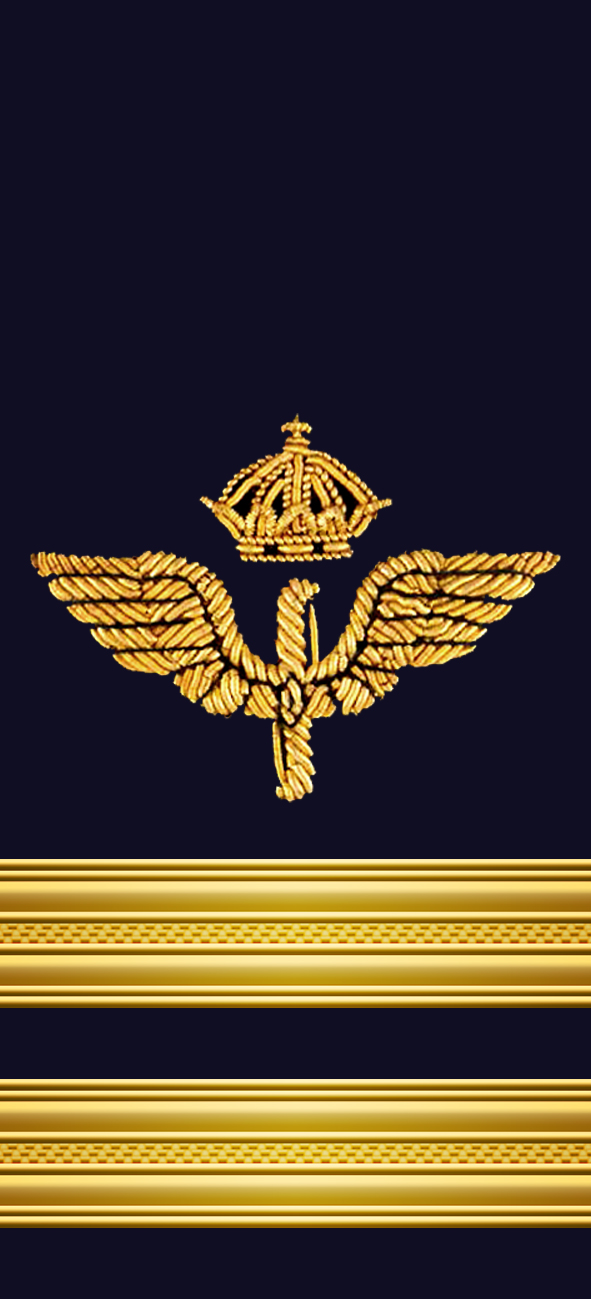
(2003–present)

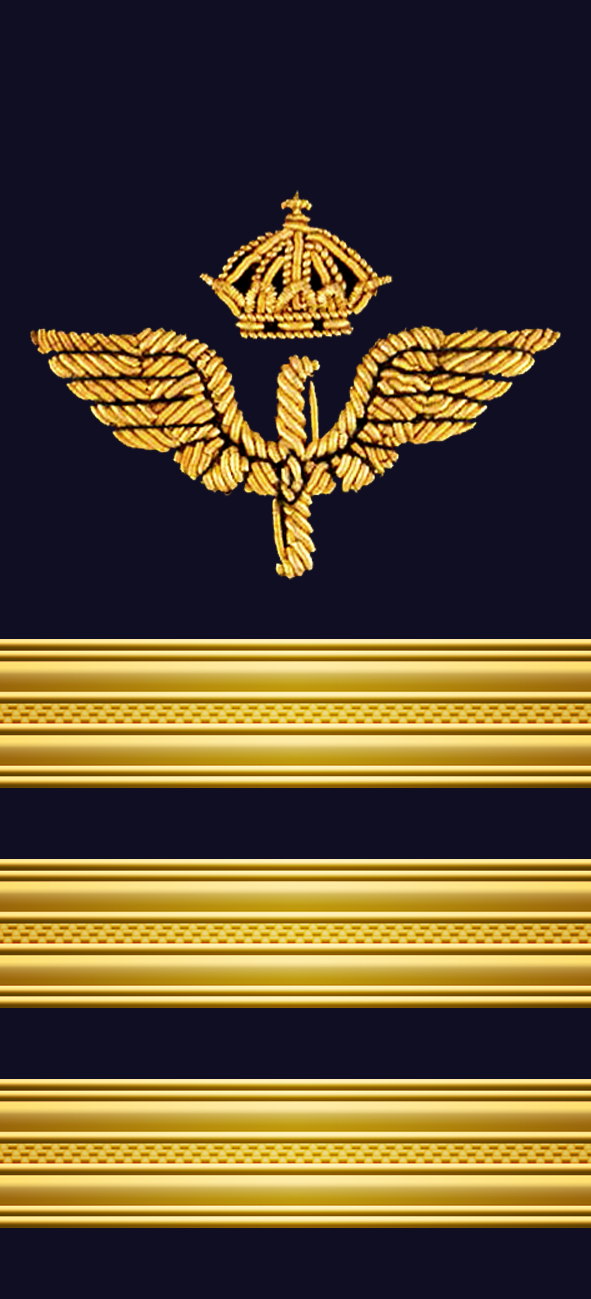
(–2003)

===== Army =====
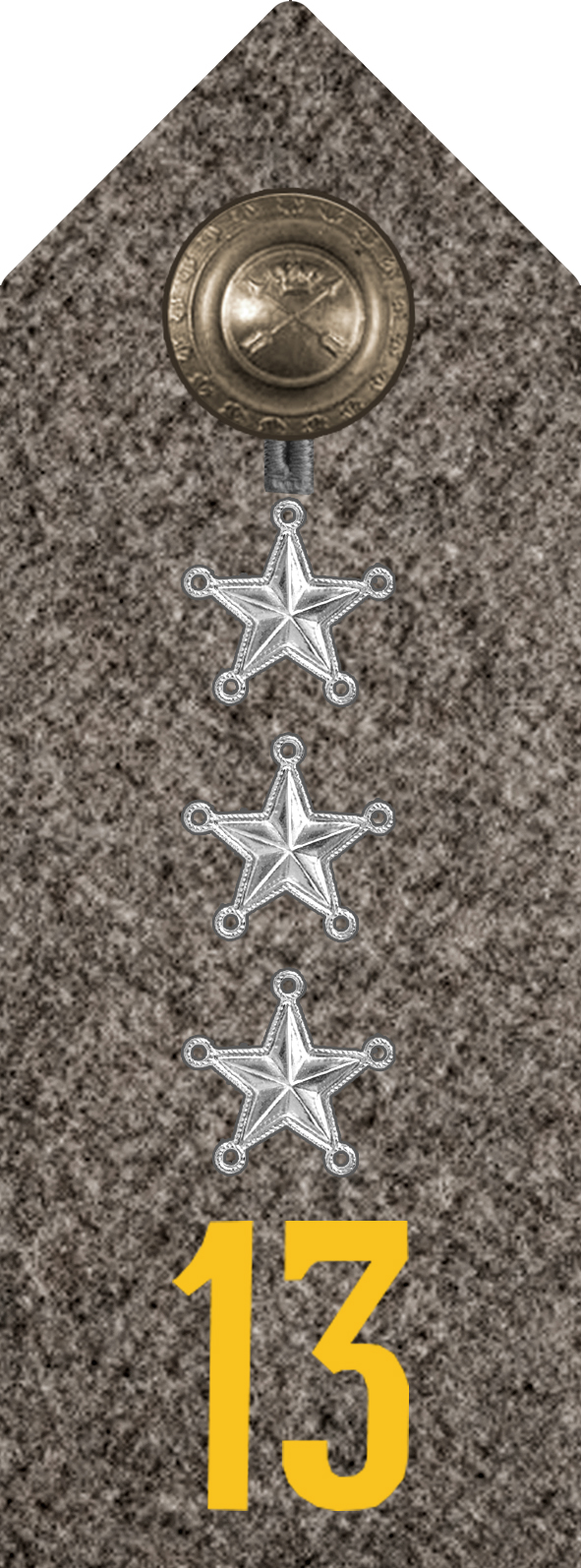
Shoulder mark m/1923
(13 = Dalarna Regiment)

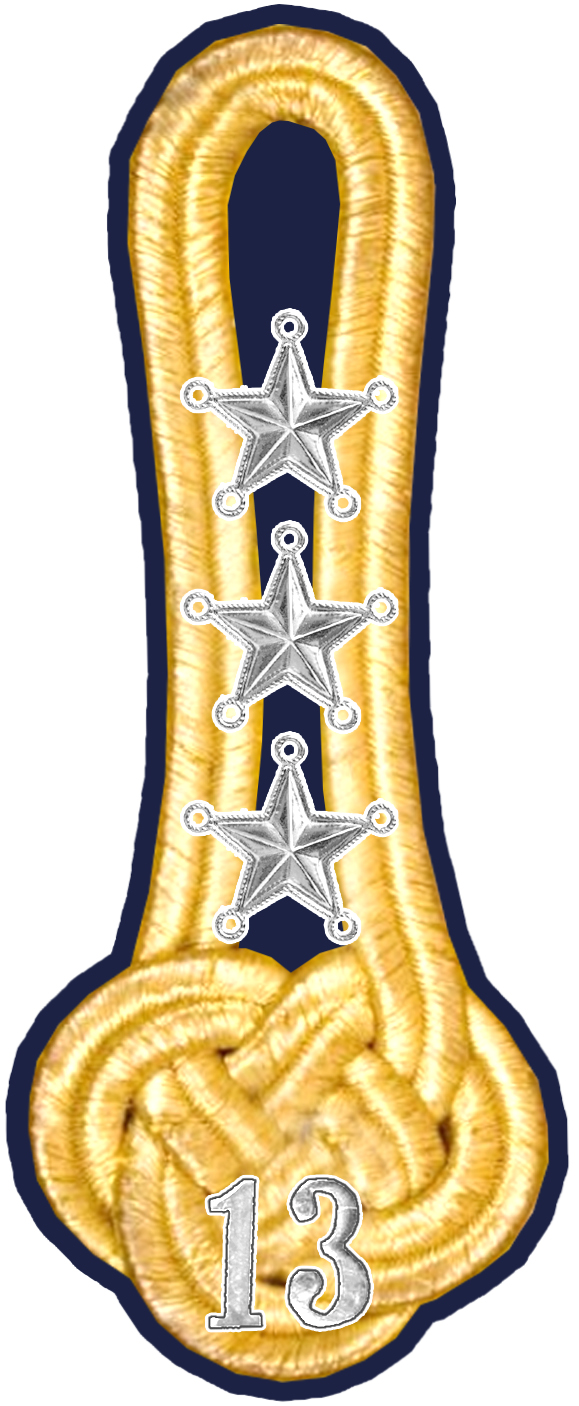
Shoulder mark m/1910
(13 = Dalarna Regiment)

===== Navy (Amphibious Corps) =====
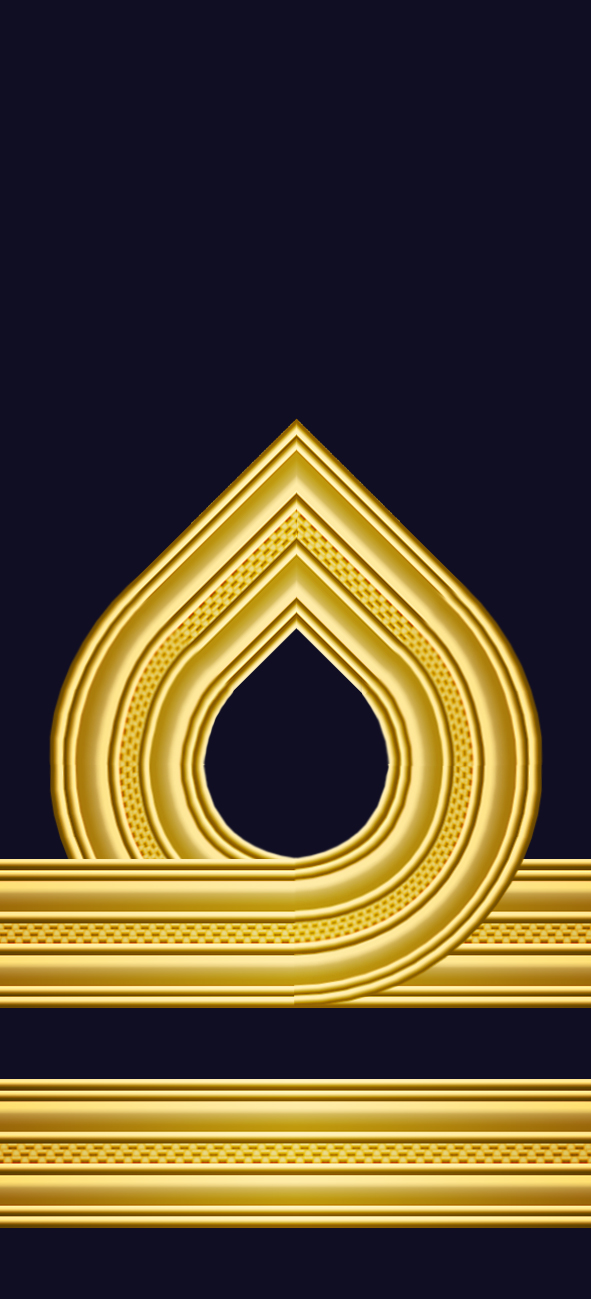
Embroidered shoulder mark (Navy)
(2003–present)

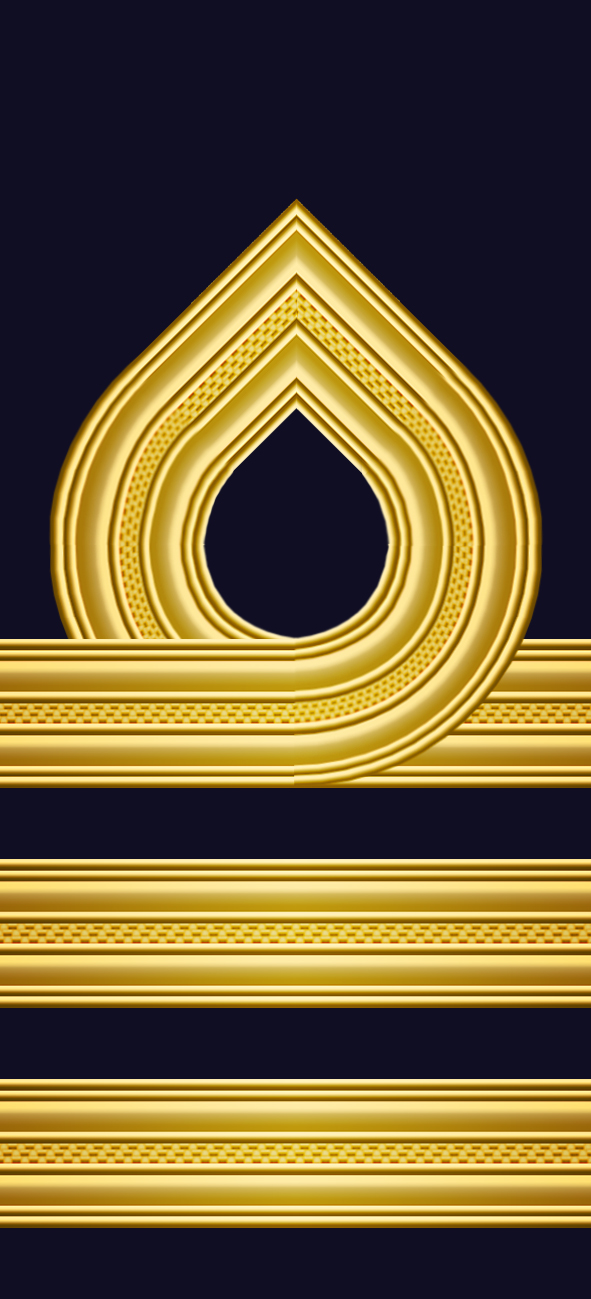
Embroidered shoulder mark (Navy)
(–2003)

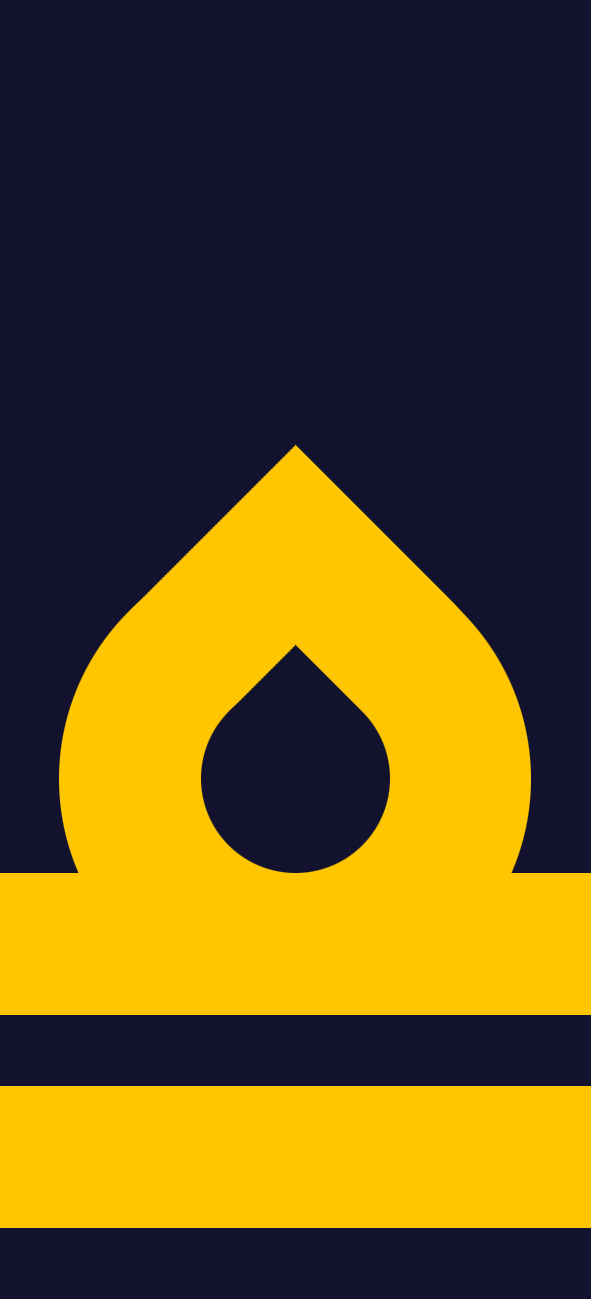
Woven shoulder mark (2003–present)

==== Air Force ====
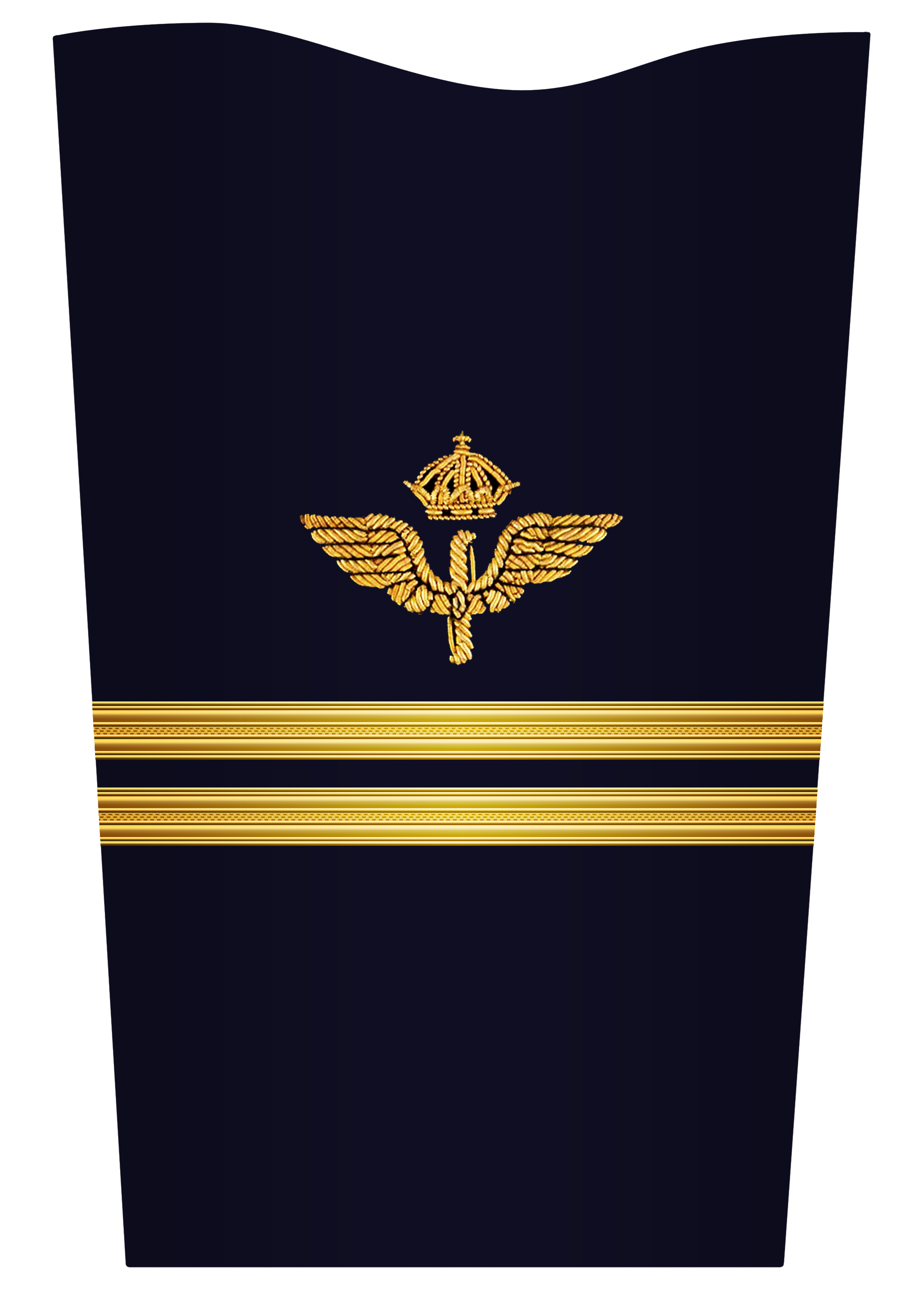
Mess jacket sleeve insignia for a captain

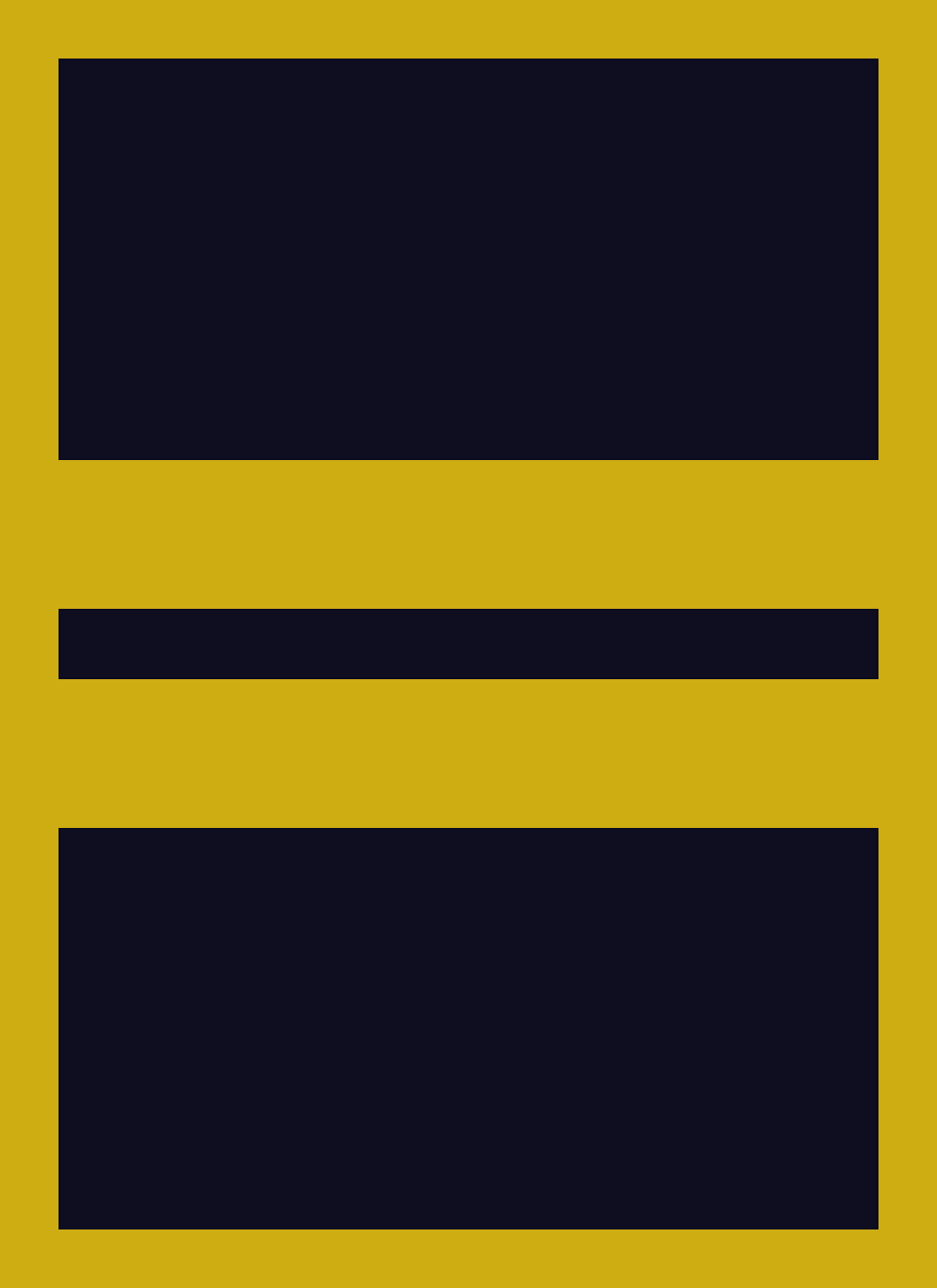
Flight suit sleeve insignia for a captain
(2003–present)

===== Army =====
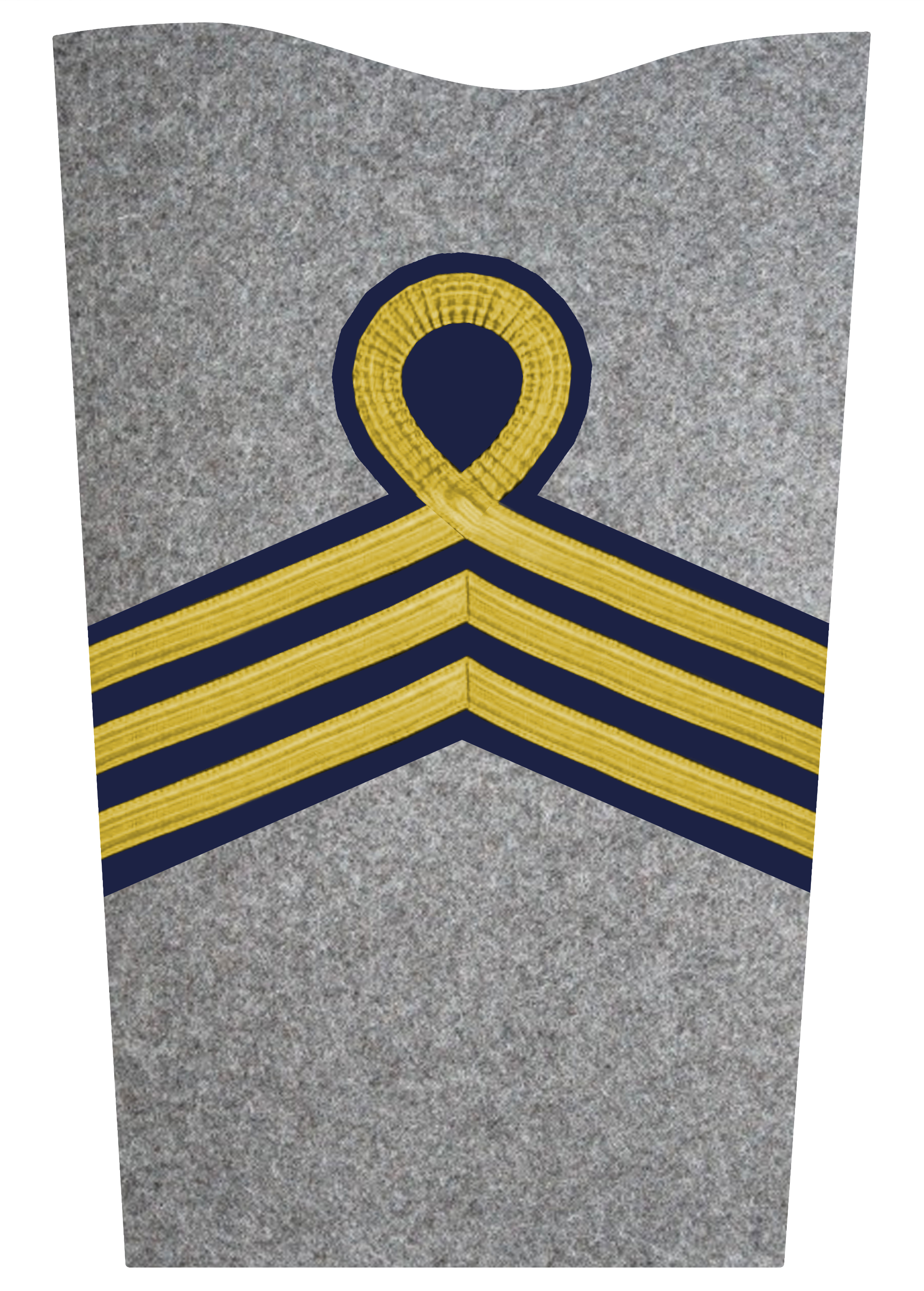
Sleeve insignia on uniform m/1906 for a captain.

===== Navy (Amphibious Corps) =====
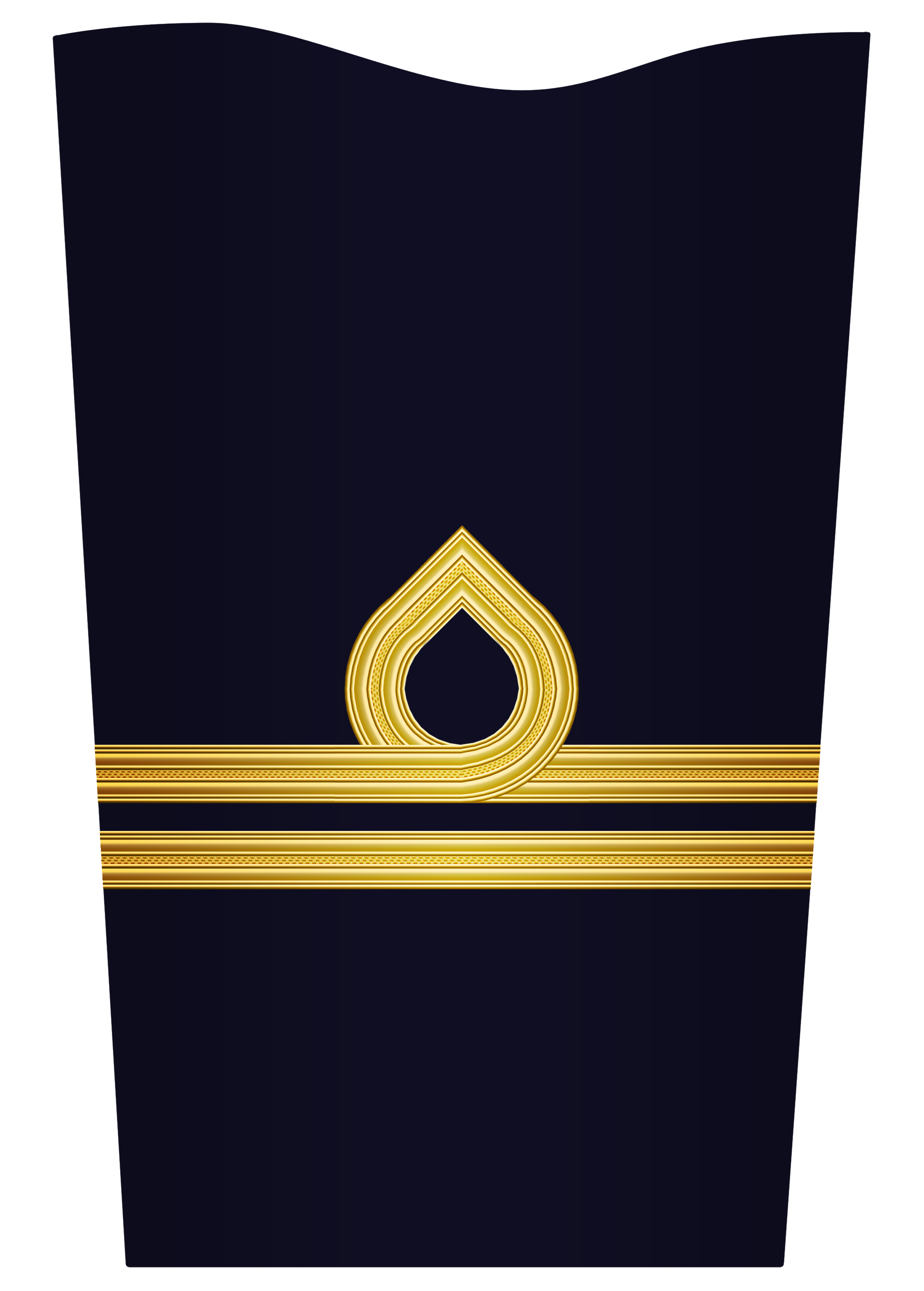
Sleeve insignia on innerkavaj m/48 ("inner jacket m/48") for a captain.
(2003–present)

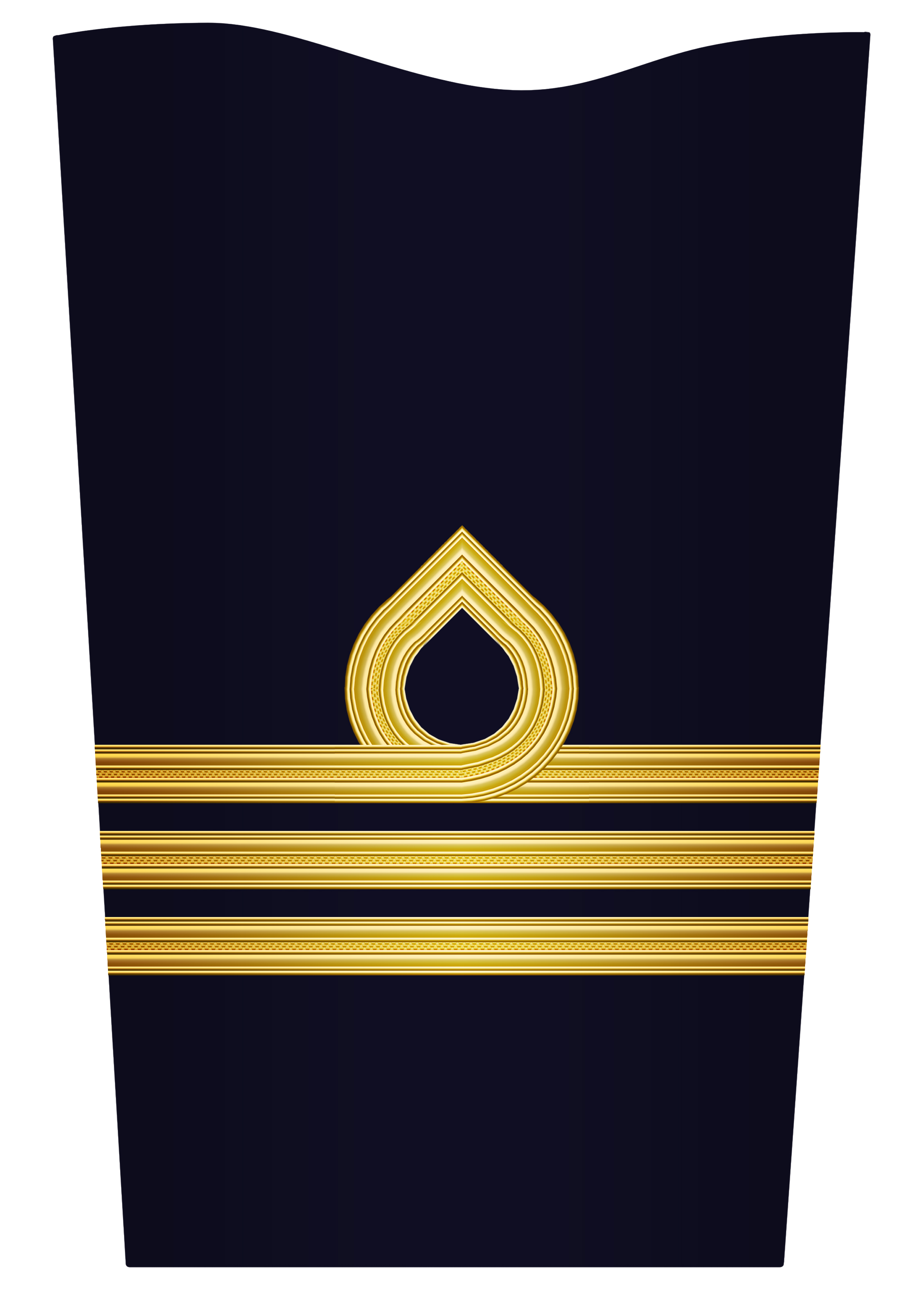
Sleeve insignia on innerkavaj m/48 ("inner jacket m/48") for a captain.
(–2003)

=== Hats ===
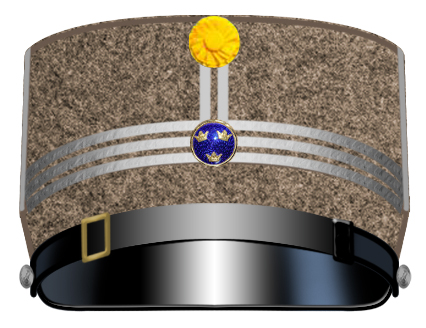
Hat (Mössa m/1923) for a captain

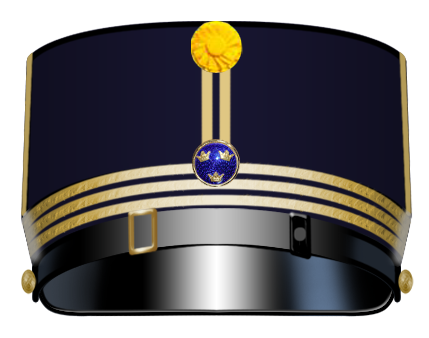
Camp hat (Lägermössa m/1865-99) for a captain

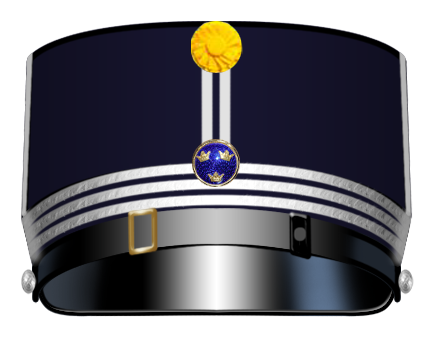
Hat (Mössa m/1865-99) for a captain in the Life Guards infantry

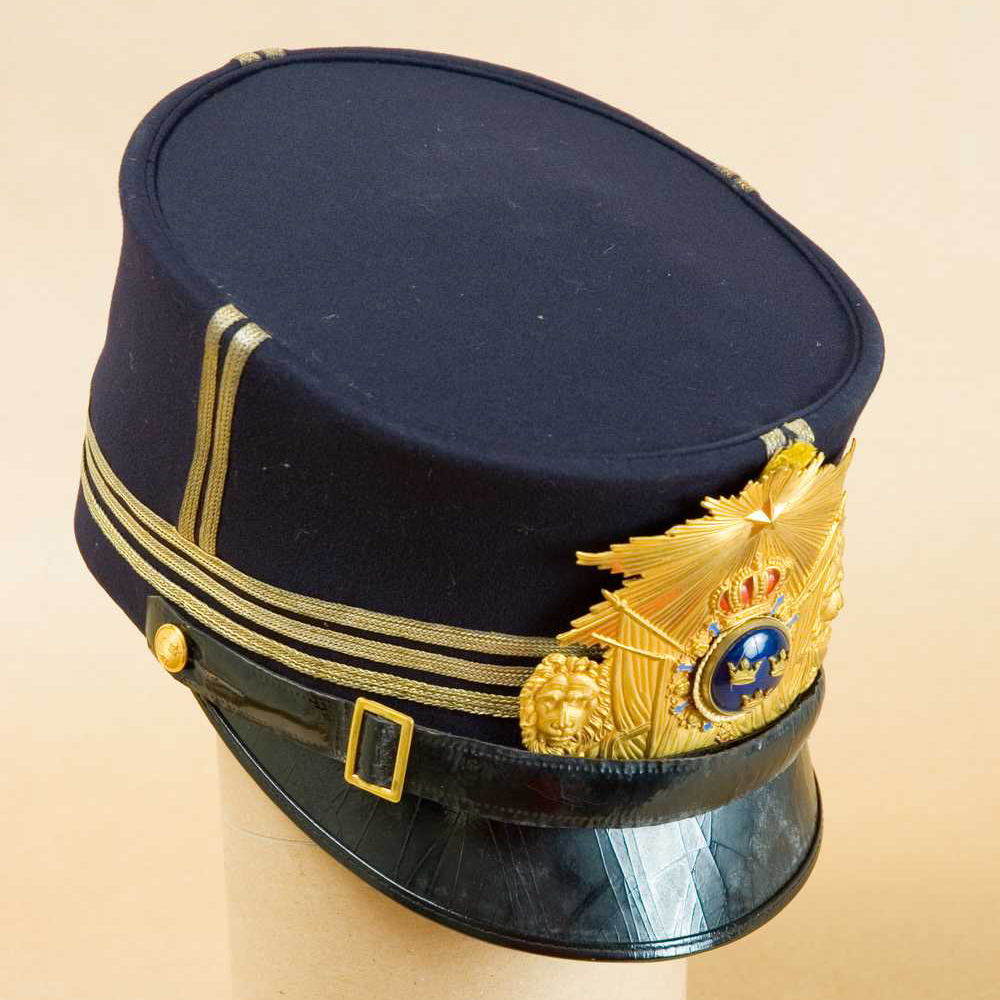
Hat (Mössa m/1865-99) for a captain in the Life Regiment of Foot

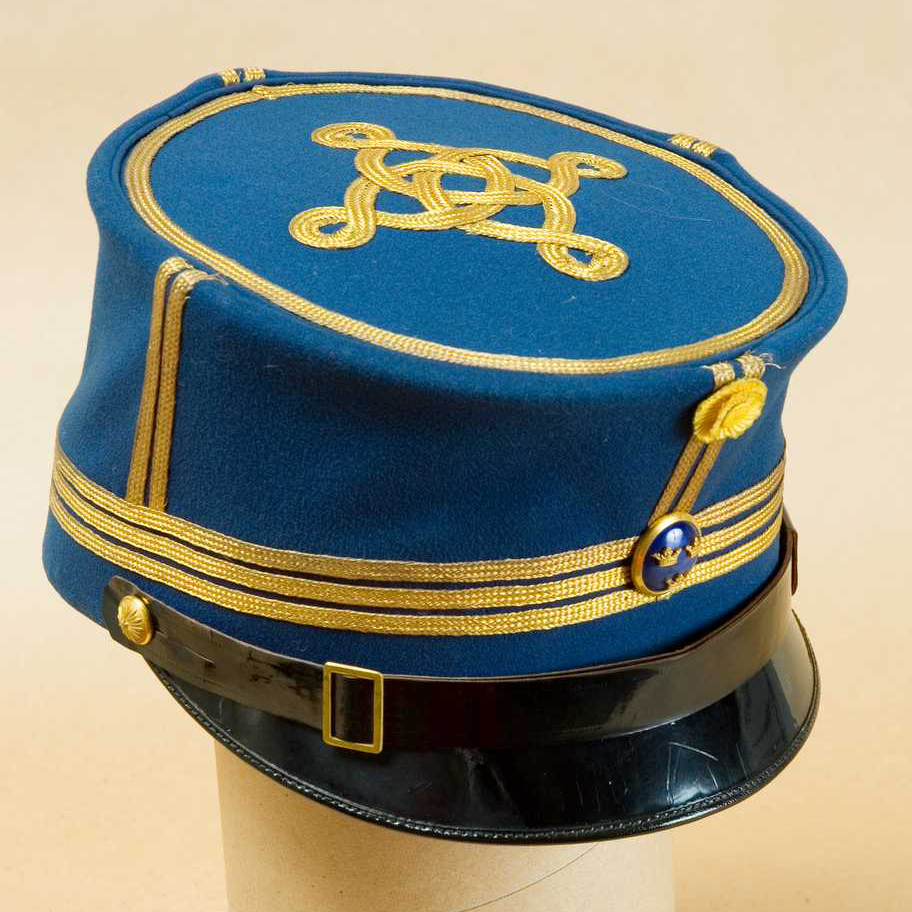
Hat (Mössa m/1865-99) for a captain in the Fortification Corps

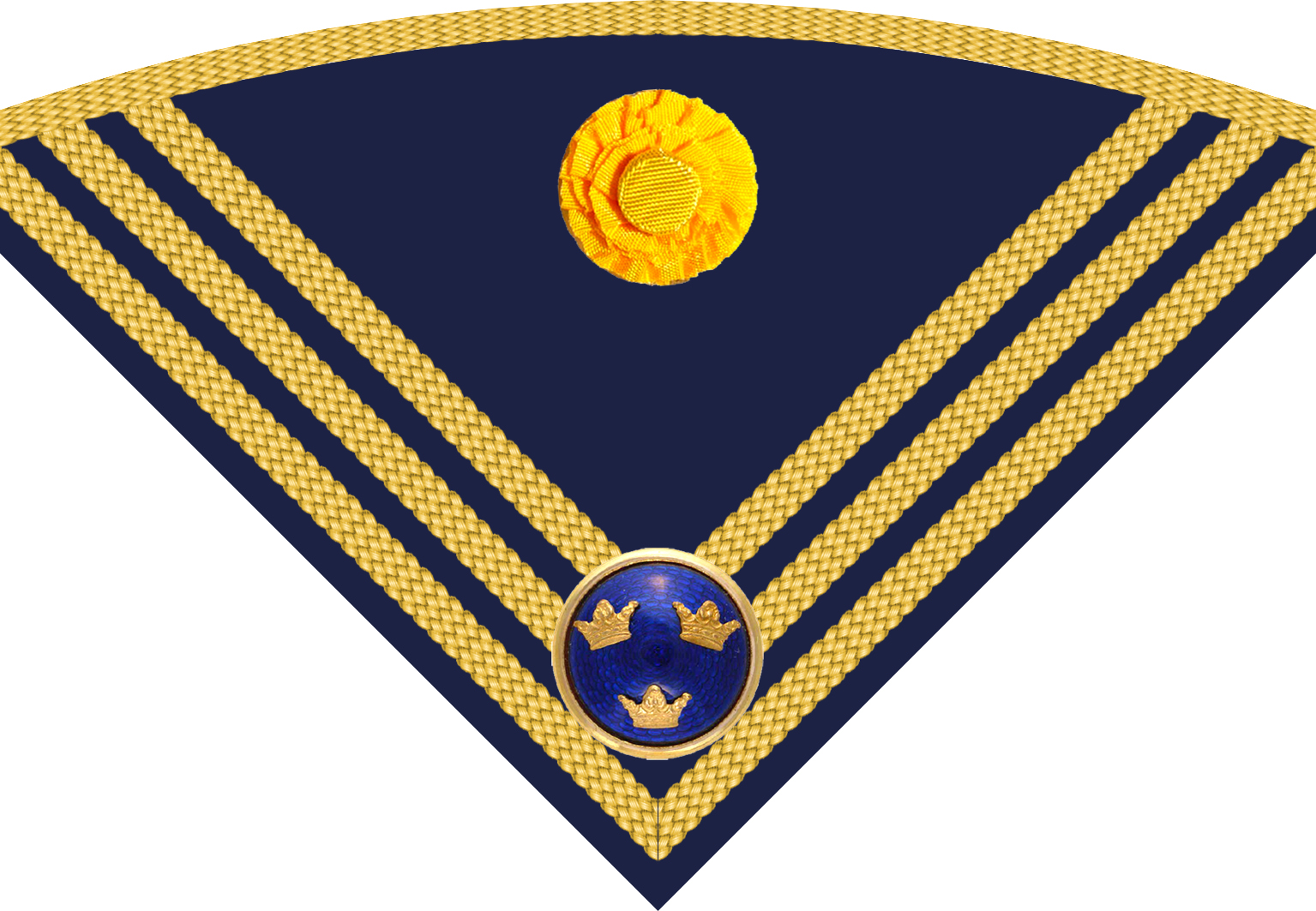
Rank insignia for a captain on hat (Hatt m/1910-14) in the army
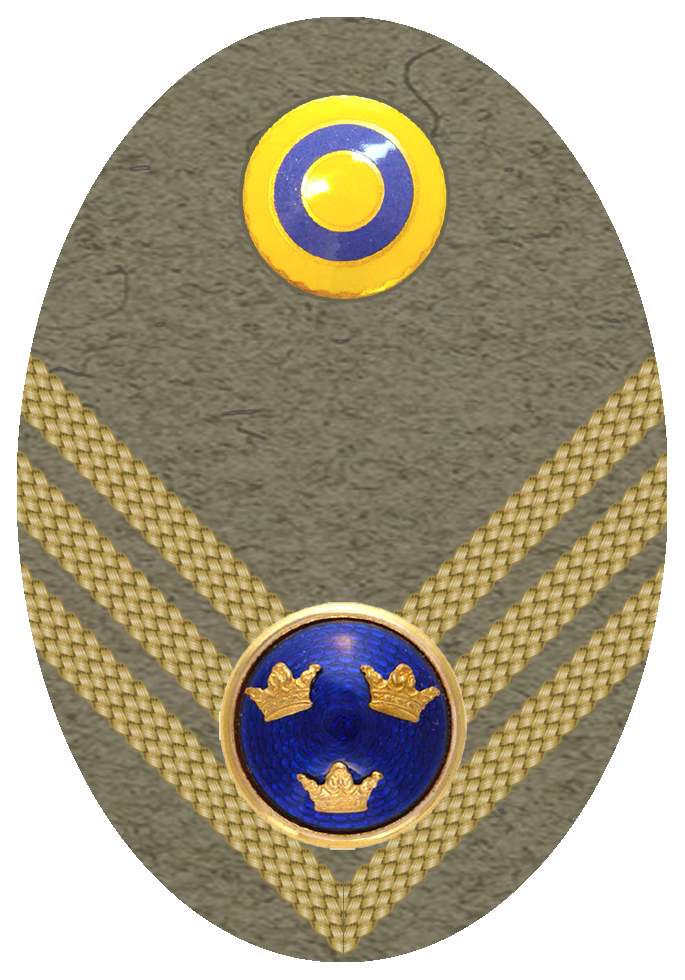
Hat badge (Mössmärke m/1946) for a captain in the army

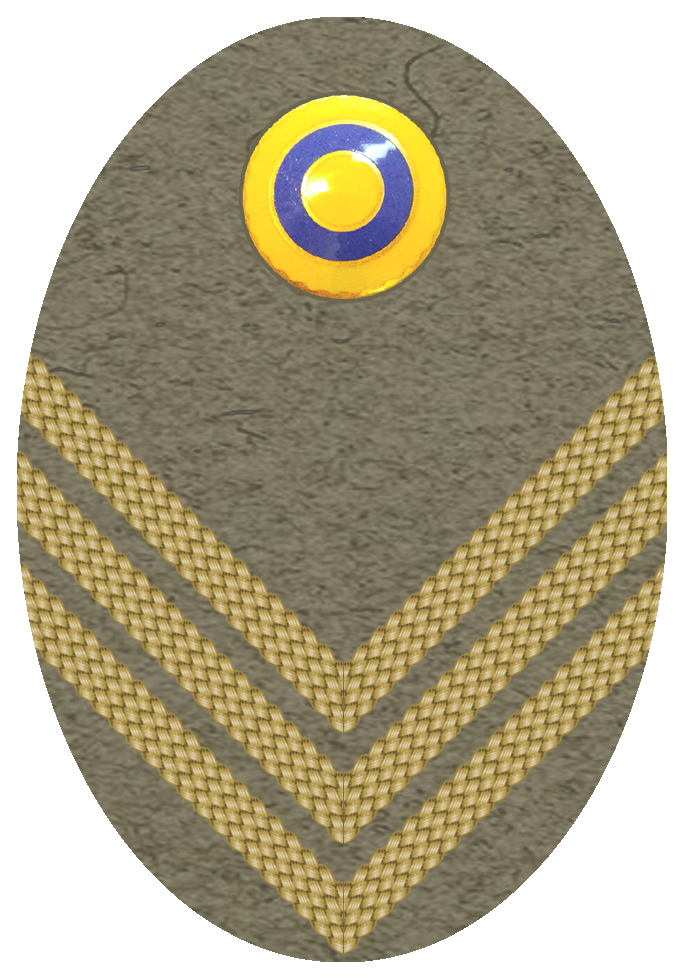
Hat badge (Mössmärke m/1940) for a captain in the army

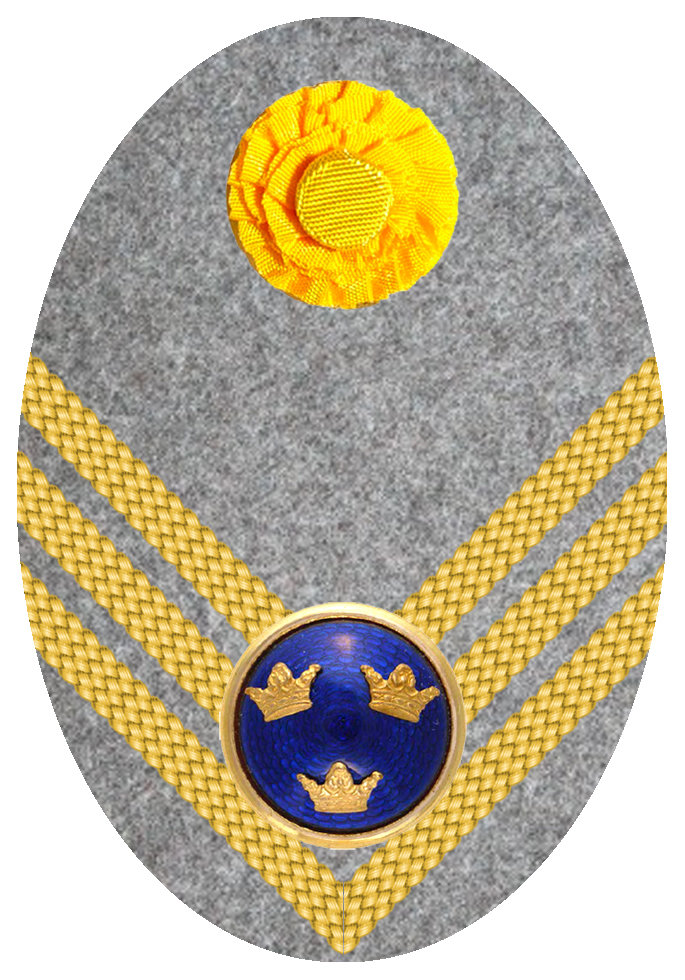
Hat badge (Mössmärke m/1914) for a captain in the army on fur hat (pälsmössa m/1909-14)

== Navy ==
Lieutenant (N) Kapten
- Country: Sweden
- Service branch: Navy
- Abbreviation: Kn (Swedish), Lt (N) (English)
- Rank: Lieutenant
- NATO rank code: OF-2
- Non-NATO rank: O-3
- Next higher rank: Lieutenant commander
- Next lower rank: Sub-lieutenant
- Equivalent ranks: Captain (army/air force); Förvaltare

Kapten (lieutenant; lit. 'Captain') is a rank in the Swedish Navy.

=== History ===
A kapten (lieutenant) in the Swedish Navy was until 1972 a rank above sub-lieutenant (löjtnant) and below lieutenant commander (kommendörkapten av 2:a graden/klassen). Since 1972, the rank is below lieutenant commander (örlogskapten).

The commander of a warship was always called kapten (captain), as is still the case on merchant ships. The kapten's duties on land were company commander, adjutant, teacher, instruction officer, etc. and on board commander of smaller ships, such as torpedo cruisers, destroyers, torpedo boats and submarines as well as gunboats, 2nd and 3rd class armored ships, or the second-in-command (sekond) on 1st class armored ships and armored cruisers, as well as flag lieutenant (flaggadjutant), squadrons, department or division, and – as far as younger kapten's are concerned – also artillery officer, navigation officer and officer on duty on larger ships.

Before 1866, the lieutenants of the navy had a higher rank and then corresponded to the army majors. What is now called kapten was then called kaptenslöjtnant.

On 1 July 2003, the Swedish Navy received new rank insignias. The new rank insignia system was inspired from Royal Navy. The idea was that the British system was more internationally viable and thus would facilitate contact between officers. However, this drew some criticism as a commander with four galloons now got three galloons, which in the old rank insignia system was the rank insignia for lieutenant (kapten). Since the same date, a lieutenant has two instead of three galloons.

=== Duties ===
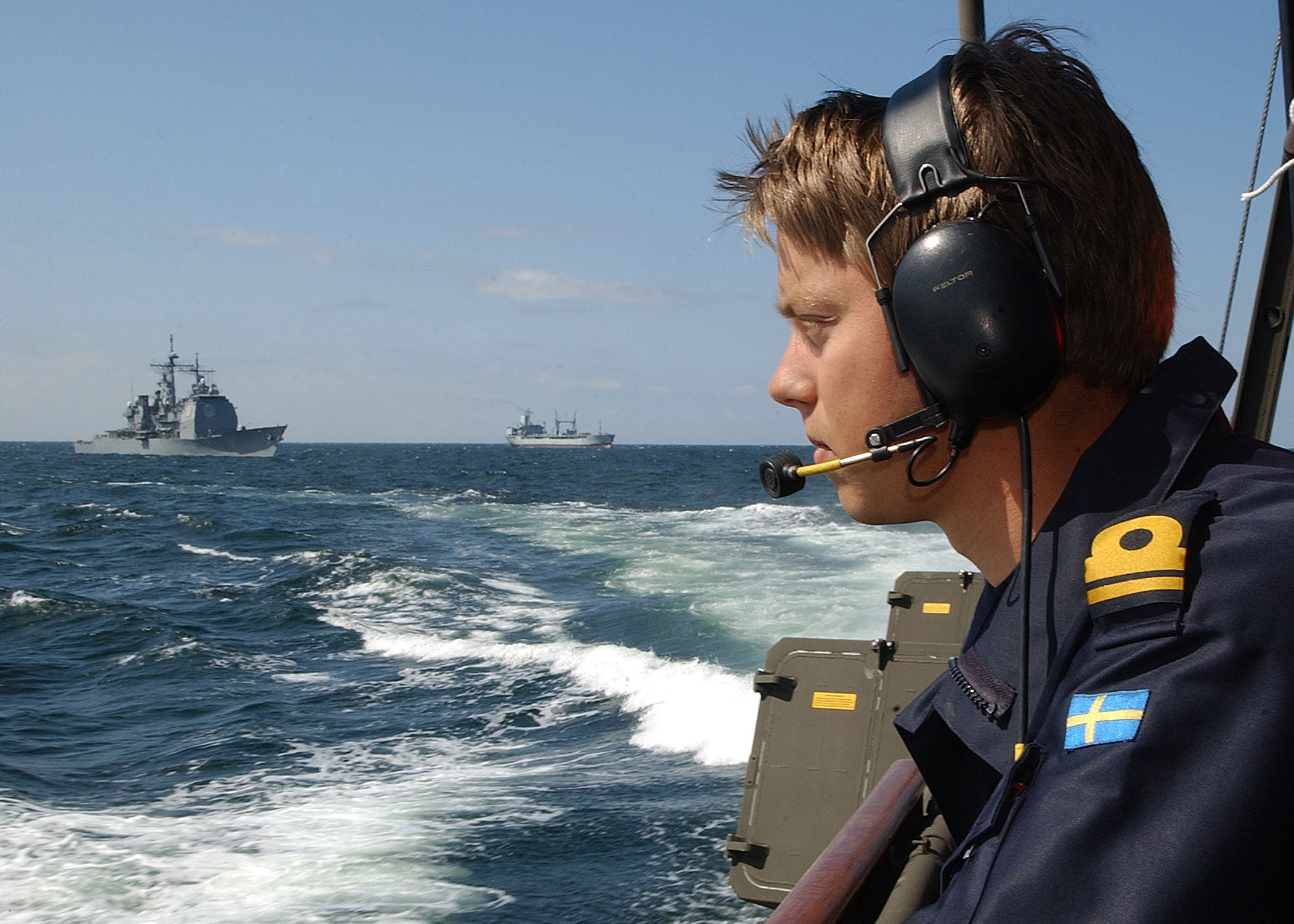
A naval officer with shoulder marks of a lieutenant.

The lieutenant of a naval unit works as a commander, for example, a battle command officer, a second-in-command (sekond) or as a commander of a smaller ship. As a staff officer, the lieutenant has more advanced positions than the sub-lieutenant. The lieutenant is also suitable to serve both at the Swedish Armed Forces' schools or at the Swedish Defence University as a teacher or other position. The individual must be able to work as a teacher in officer training. The navy specifies a total period of service of six years before it is time to become a lieutenant.

=== Promotion ===
According to Chapter 2, Section 1 of FFS 2018:7, a person who is eligible for promotion has served in the Swedish Armed Forces to such an extent that assessment of suitability, knowledge and skills could be carried out, is deemed suitable for promotion, possesses the knowledge and skills required for the higher rank, and meets time requirements according to Section 2 (must have held the rank for at least two years). For promotion from sub-lieutenant to lieutenant, it is only required that the sub-lieutenant is promotable according to Chapter 2, Section 1.

Promotion of lieutenant to lieutenant commander may take place when the lieutenant has completed applicable promotion training with approved results. After completing a tactical staff course at the Swedish Defence University, a lieutenant who is OFSK may only be promoted to lieutenant commander with a passing grade if the position is within the functional area where the lieutenant's special competence is located, and if the position's rank code is OF 3. Responsible head of promotion to lieutenant is the unit commander.

In the case of reserve officers, promotion of sub-lieutenant to lieutenant may take place if the sub-lieutenant holds an academic degree at the undergraduate level, or at least 180 credits if the program includes more than 180 credits. Promotion of lieutenant to lieutenant commander may take place when the lieutenant has completed applicable promotion training with approved results.

=== Uniform ===
==== Shoulder marks ====
The top galloon is shaped like a "loop" for an officer in the Swedish Navy (the loop is shaped like a "grenade" for an officer in the Swedish Amphibious Corps). The rank insignia is worn on the shoulder mark to jacket and coat (jacka m/87, kappa m/87), as well as to blue wool sweater (blå ylletröja m/87), trench coat (trenchcoat m/84), sea coat (sjörock 93, black raincoat and to white shirt (vit skjorta m/78). Rank insignia on shoulder mark (axelklaffshylsa 02B) is worn on all garments with shoulder straps.

1. The shoulder mark (Axelklaffshylsa m/02B) is designed as galloons sewn directly to another shoulder mark (axelklaffshylsa m/87 blå). Since 2003 it consists of two gold galloons. Before 2003, this type of shoulder mark with two galloons was worn by a sub-lieutenant (löjtnant).

2. Before 2003, a lieutenant wore three gold galloons. Since 2003, this shoulder mark is used by a commander.

3. The woven shoulder mark (AXELKLAFFSHYLSA M/02 INVÄVD KAPTEN FLOTTAN) is worn on the naval combat dress (sjöstridsdräkt m/93), duty uniform (arbetsdräkt m/87 (blå)) and combat uniform (Fältuniform m/90 lätt, m/90 lätt blå, m/90 tropik (green, beige and blue)).

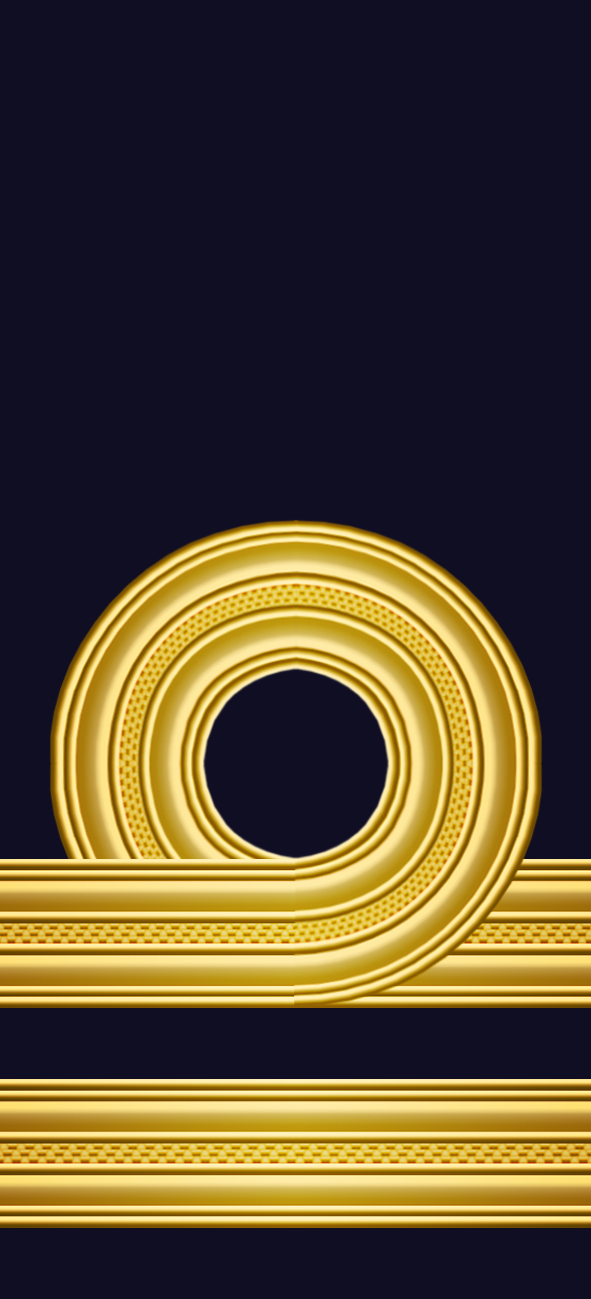
1. Embroidered shoulder mark (2003–present)

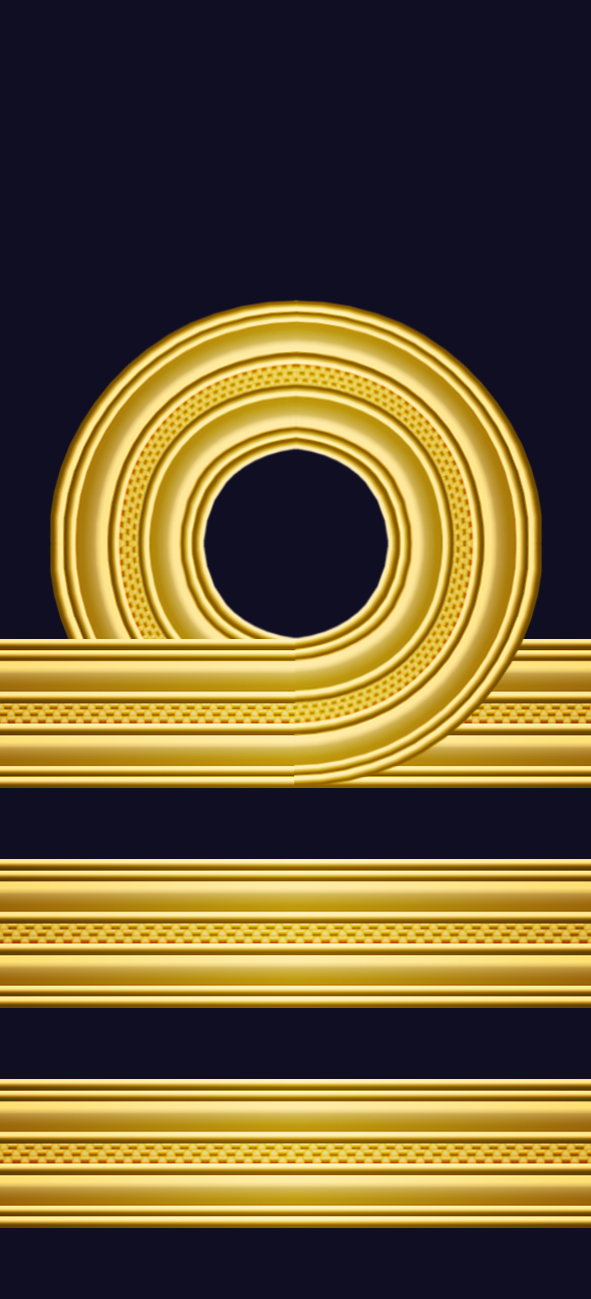
2. Embroidered shoulder mark (–2003)

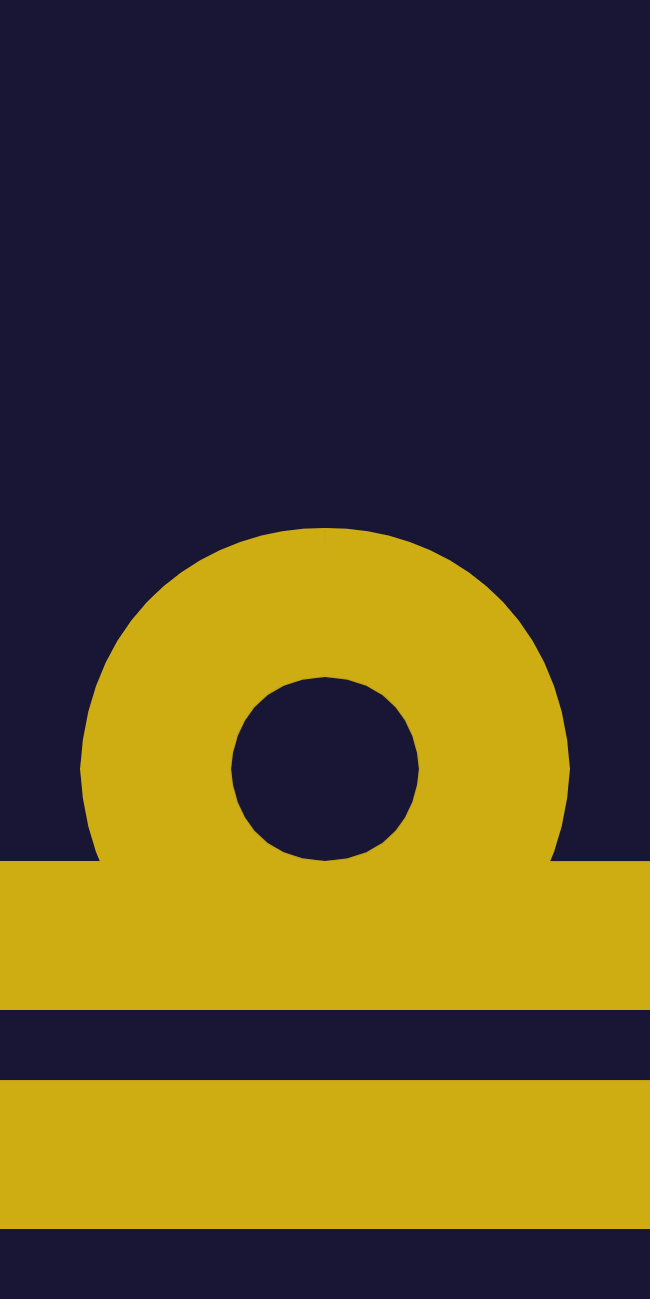
3. Woven shoulder mark (2003–present)

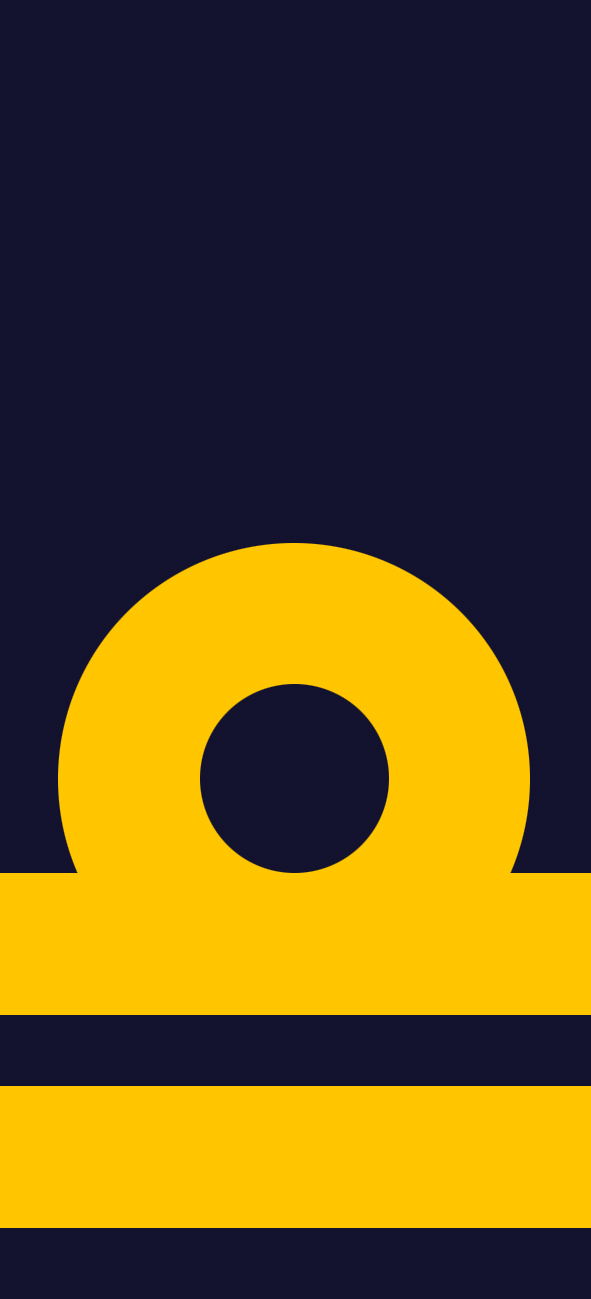
3. Woven shoulder mark (2003–present)

==== Sleeve insignias ====
Rank insignia is worn on both sleeves for inner suit jacket (innerkavaj m/48) and mess jacket (mässjacka m/1878).

1. On the sleeve an 12,6 mm rank insignia (gradbeteckning m/02) and galloon (galon m/02). The distance between galloons should be 6 mm. The distance from the bottom edge of the sleeve to the bottom edge of the top galloon should be 100 mm. This type of sleeve insignia with two galloons was worn by a sub-lieutenant (löjtnant) until 2003.

2. Before 2003, lieutenants wore three gold galloons and a loop of gold galloon. Since 2003, this type of sleeve insignia is used by a commander.

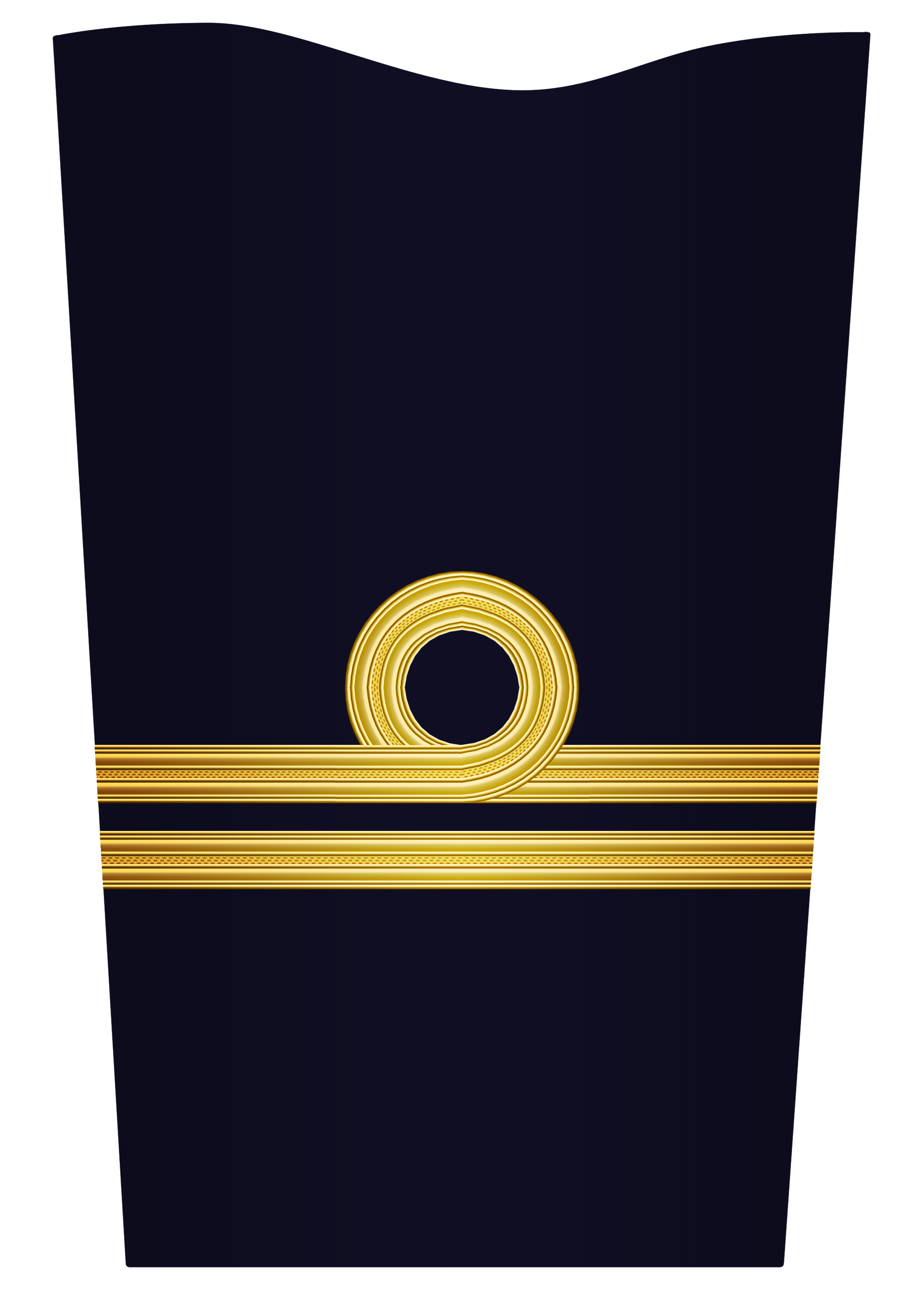
1. Sleeve insignia for a lieutenant (2003–present)

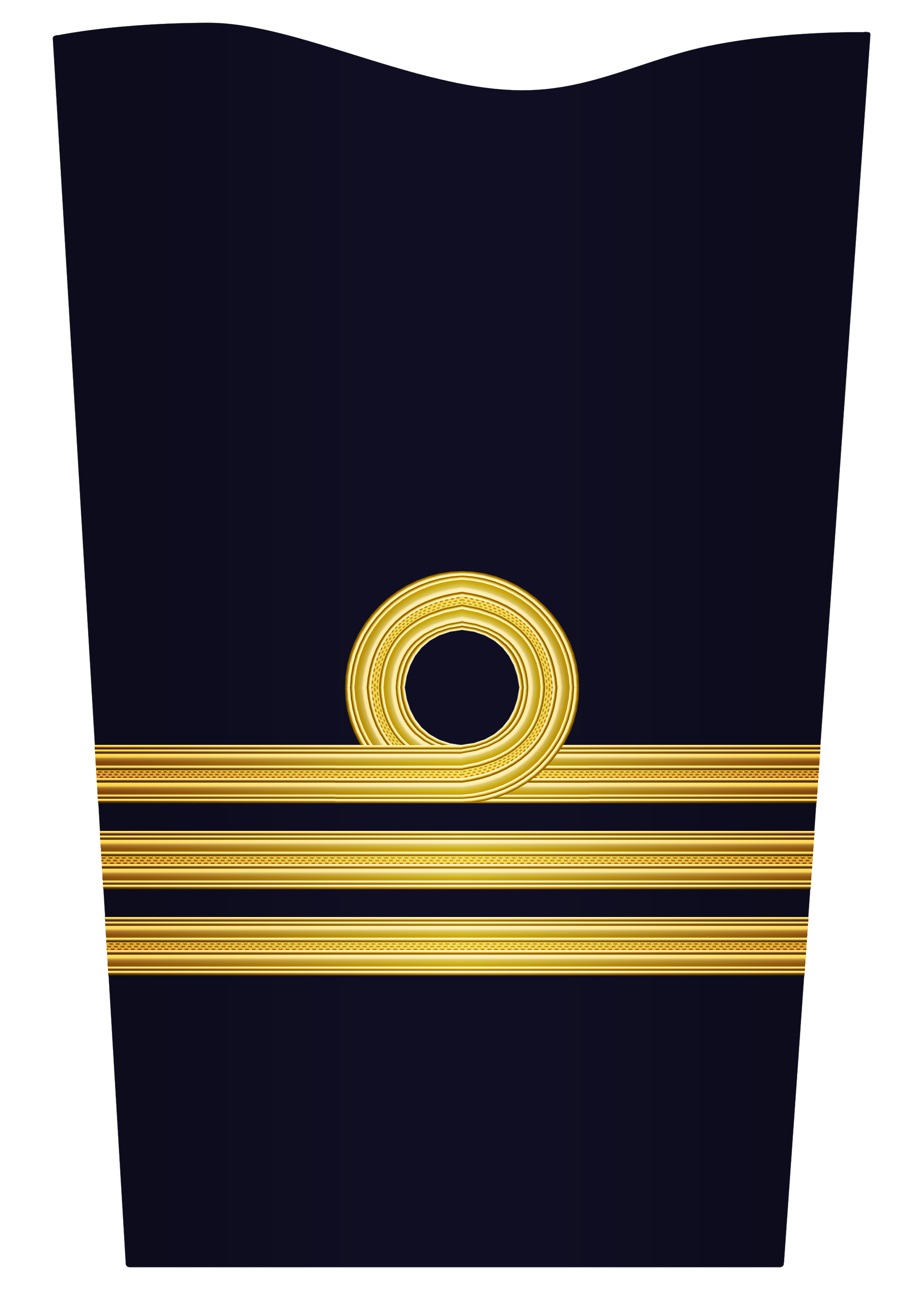
2. Sleeve insignia for a lieutenant (–2003)

==== Hats ====
===== Peaked cap =====
A lieutenant wears a peaked cap (skärmmössa m/48) which is fitted with a hat badge (mössmärke m/78 off för flottan) and with a lacing in form of a golden thread (mössnodd m/82).

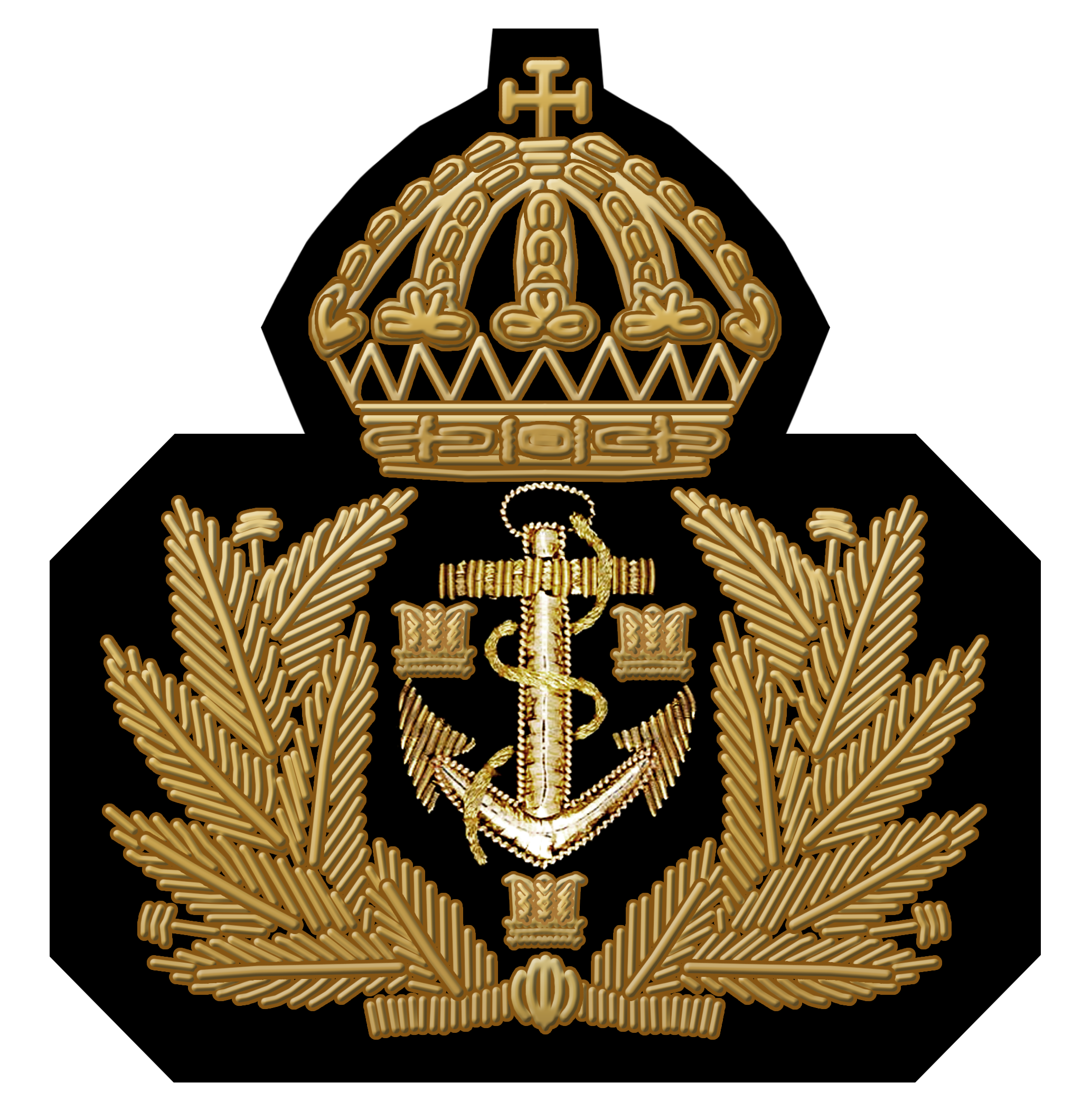
Hat badge

===== Side cap and winter hat =====
An officer wears a hat badge (mössmärke m/78 off) for the navy and another (mössmärke m/87 off) for amphibious units on the side cap (båtmössa m/48) and on the winter hat (vintermössa m/87).

==== Epaulette ====
A lieutenant wears epaulette's (epålett m/1878) to white tie (frack m/1878) and to coat (rock m/1878). On the epaulette, a lieutenant wears 2 mm fringes in two rows.
