= Björn von der Esch =

Swedish politician (1930–2010)

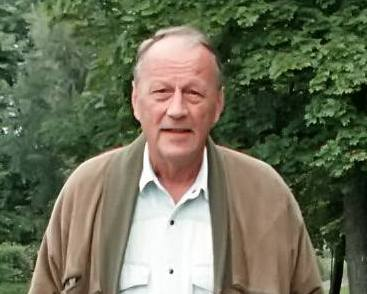

Member of the Sweden Parliament for Södermanland County
- In office 2002 – 2006 (kd)
- In office 1998 – 2002 (kd)
- In office 1991 – 1994 (m)

First Marshal of the Court
- In office 1975–1980
- Monarch: Carl XVI Gustaf
- Preceded by: Tom Wachtmeister
- Succeeded by: Lennart Ahrén

Personal details
- Born: Carl Gösta Björn Joachim von der Esch; 11 January 1930 Essen, Germany
- Died: 10 March 2010 (aged 80) Västerljung, Sweden
- Party: Moderate Party (1991–1994); Christian Democrats (1998–2006); June List (2008–2010)
- Spouse: Signe Lundström (m. 1956)
- Children: 4

Military service
- Allegiance: Swedish Armed Forces
- Branch/service: Swedish Navy
- Years of service: 1952–
- Rank: Lieutenant commander (reserve)

Carl Gösta Björn Joachim von der Esch (11 January 1930 – 10 March 2010) was a Swedish Christian democratic politician, member of parliament 1998–2006.

== Early life and education ==
von der Esch was born on 11 January 1930 in Essen, Germany, the son of German ambassador Hansjoachim von der Esch and his Swedish wife Marianne (née Sandstedt). His grandfather was the Prussian Lieutenant General Hans von der Esch (1862–1934).

von der Esch passed studentexamen in 1949 and completed his officer training at the Royal Swedish Naval Academy in 1952. He served as an officer in the Swedish Navy from 1952 and transferred to the reserve in 1958, later attaining the rank of lieutenant commander in 1963. He attended forestry and sawmill school in 1958 and agricultural college in 1960. He earned a Bachelor of Arts degree in 1963, a Master of Political Science in 1965, and a Doctorate in Economics from Uppsala University in 1973.

== Career ==
von der Esch worked as a farmer from 1960 to 1975 and again from 1981 onward. Between 1965 and 1969, he was employed at the administrative office of the Swedish Agricultural Federation. From 1975 to 1980, he served as First Marshal of the Court and head of the Office of the Marshal of the Court, including the Department of the Keeper of the Privy Purse and Treasurer to His Majesty the King (Hovförvaltningen).

He was member of parliament for the Moderate Party from 1991 to 1994, replacing Per Westerberg during his time as a minister. At the time of the Swedish 1994 referendum on membership in the European Union, Esch clashed with the Moderate Party as he campaigned on the "no" side. When he subsequently formed a list of EU critics that ran in the 1995 European Parliament election in Sweden, he was expelled from the party. This list was unsuccessful in the election, and von der Esch returned to parliamentary politics in 1998 as a Christian Democrats.

In the 2003 referendum on joining the Economic and Monetary Union and the euro, he again campaigned on the "no" side. He later joined the June List, became its vice chairman in 2008, and was on second place on the June List ballot in the 2009 European Parliament election in which the party lost its representation in the European Parliament.

== Personal life ==
In 1956, von der Esch married Signe Lundström (1934–2022), the daughgter of Major General Åge Lundström and Margit (née von Geijer). They had four children: Louise, Susanne, Joachim, and Carl (born 1969).

== Death ==
von der Esch died on 10 March 2010.

== Awards and decorations ==
- (Iceland) Grand Cross of the Order of the Falcon (10 June 1975)
- (Norway) Grand Cross of the Order of St. Olav (1975)

Court offices
Preceded by Tom Wachtmeister	First Marshal of the Court; 1975–1980	Succeeded by Lennart Ahrén
