= Justice List =

Swedish electoral alliance

Justice List (in Swedish: Rättviselistan) was an alliance formed in Sweden in June 1995, ahead of the European Parliament elections. The main constituents were two trotskyist parties, the Socialist Party (SP) and Workers League Offensive (AFO). Also the Democratic Welfare Party in Helsingborg participated as well as individual social democrats and trade unionists.

== Elections ==
The list got 14,904 votes (0.56% of the votes). The electoral districts in which the list got most votes by percentage were Malmöhus län norra 2.7% (2039 votes) and Västerbottens län 1.3% (1180 votes). The municipalities in which the list got the highest number of votes were Helsingborg 5.3% (1733 votes) and Stockholm 0.6% (1478 votes).

== End of the party ==
Although the cooperation between SP and AFO might have been intended to last, the alliance was soon broken after the elections. SP accused AFO of economic mismanagement of joint funds.
