= Free EU-Critics =

Swedish effort to exit the European Union

Free EU-Critics (in Swedish: Fria EU-kritiker) was a political project in Sweden launched ahead of the 1995 European Parliament elections by Moderate politician Björn von der Esch, intended to present an alternative for right-wing ('bourgeoisie') Eurosceptics. The list presented by the group included members and former members from a variety of political parties, united in their opposition to European Union membership. The list received 0.7% of the vote in the 1995 election.
