= 1995 European Parliament election in Sweden =

- 17 September 1995

22 seats to the European Parliament
- Turnout: 41.63%
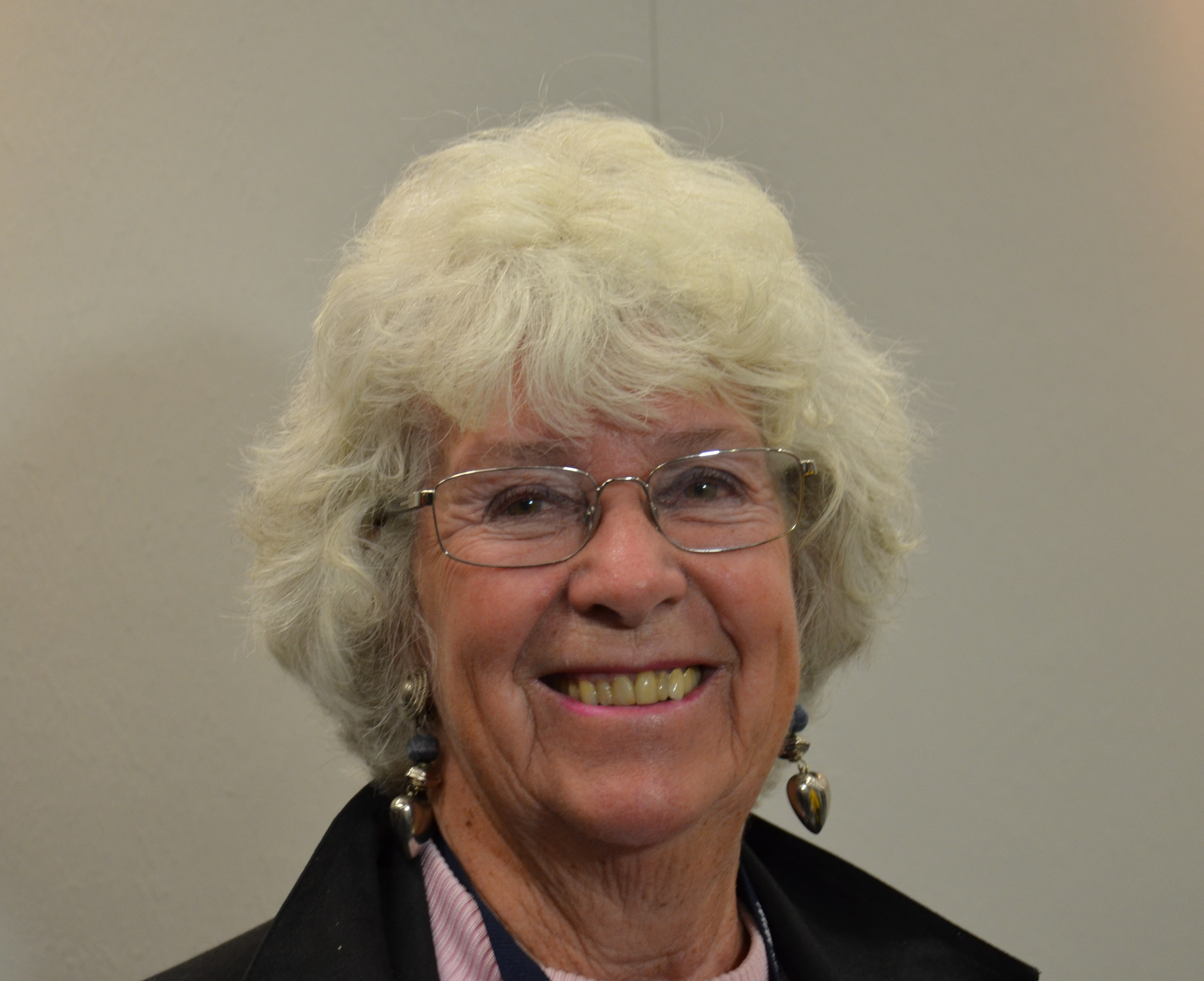

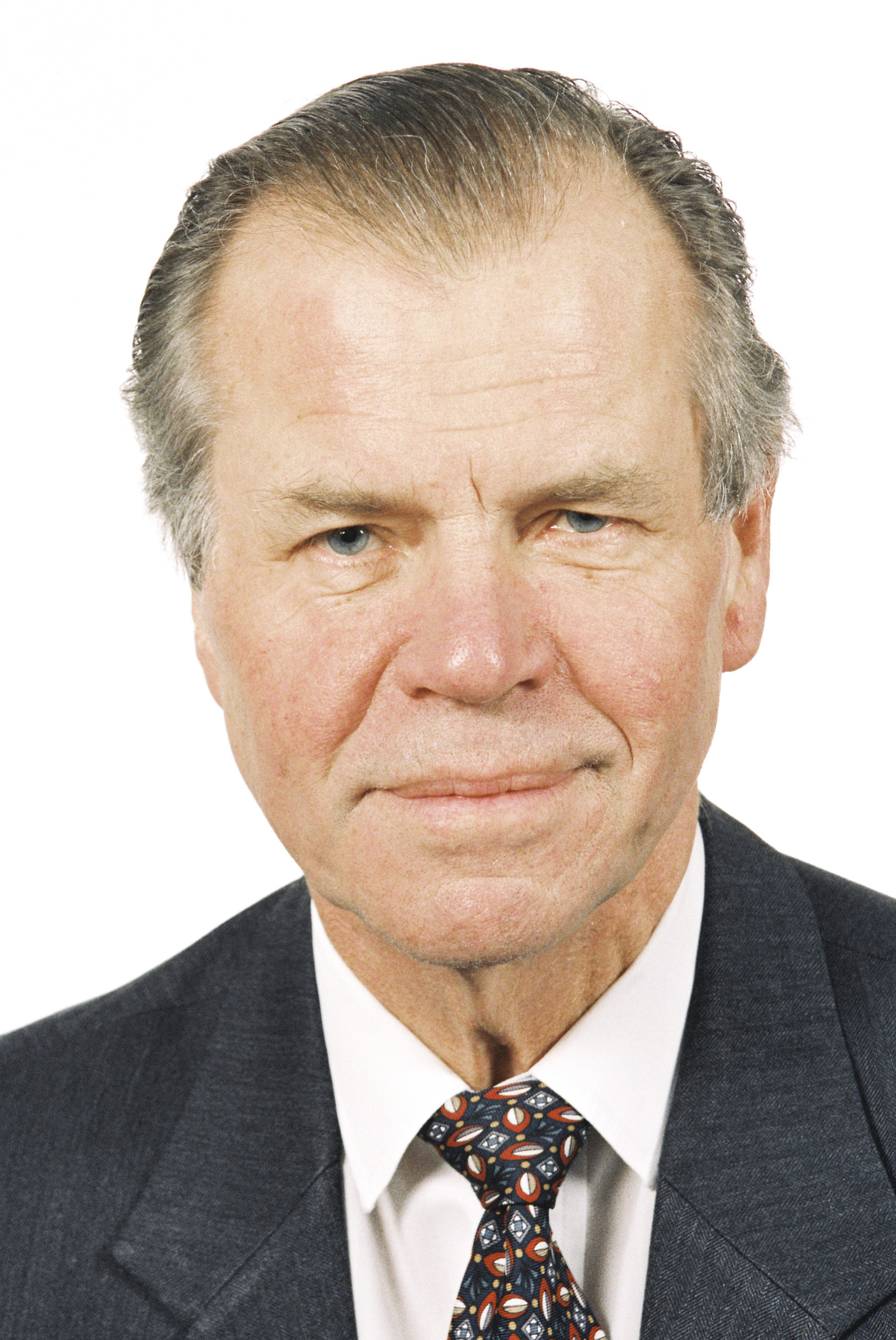

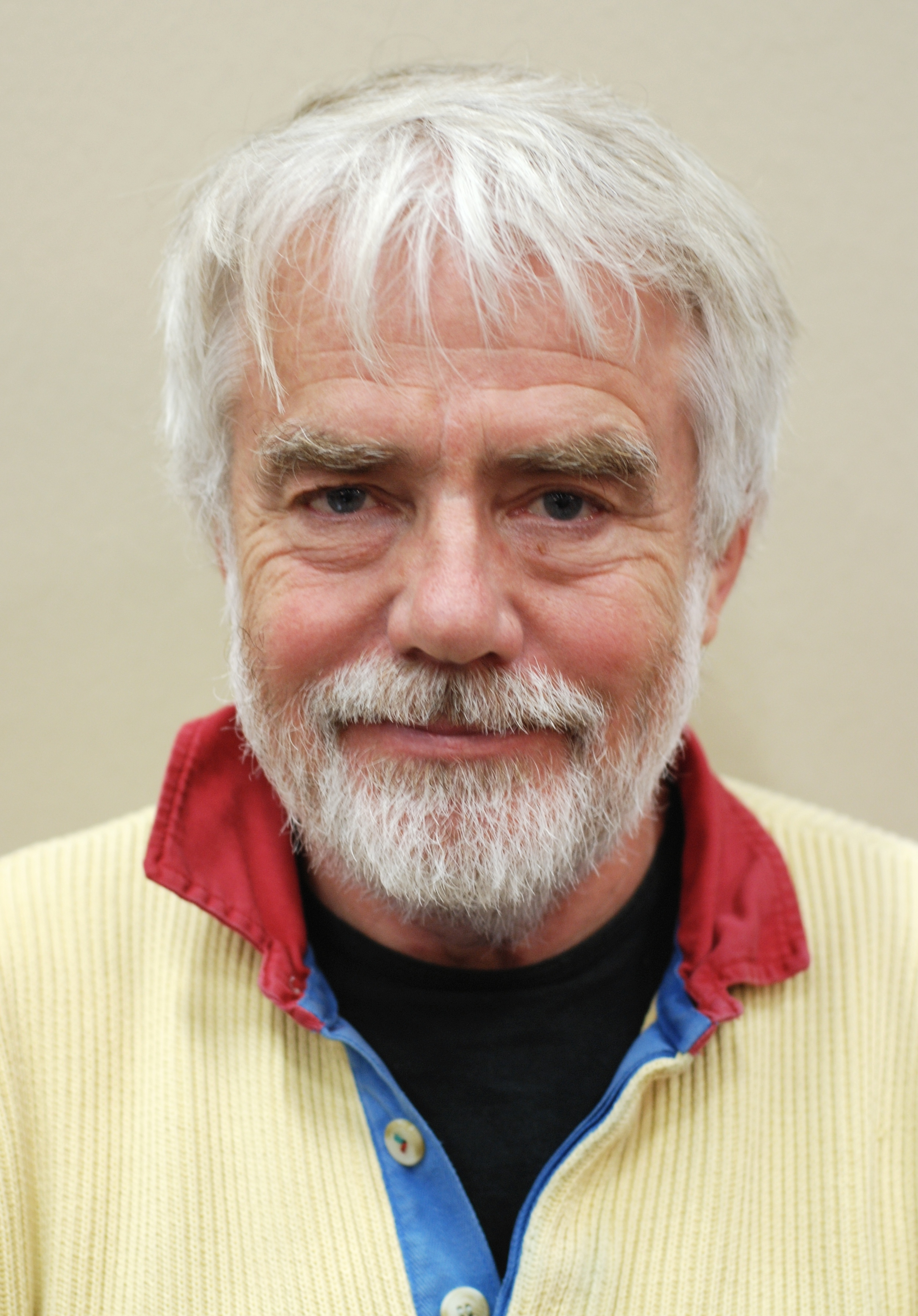

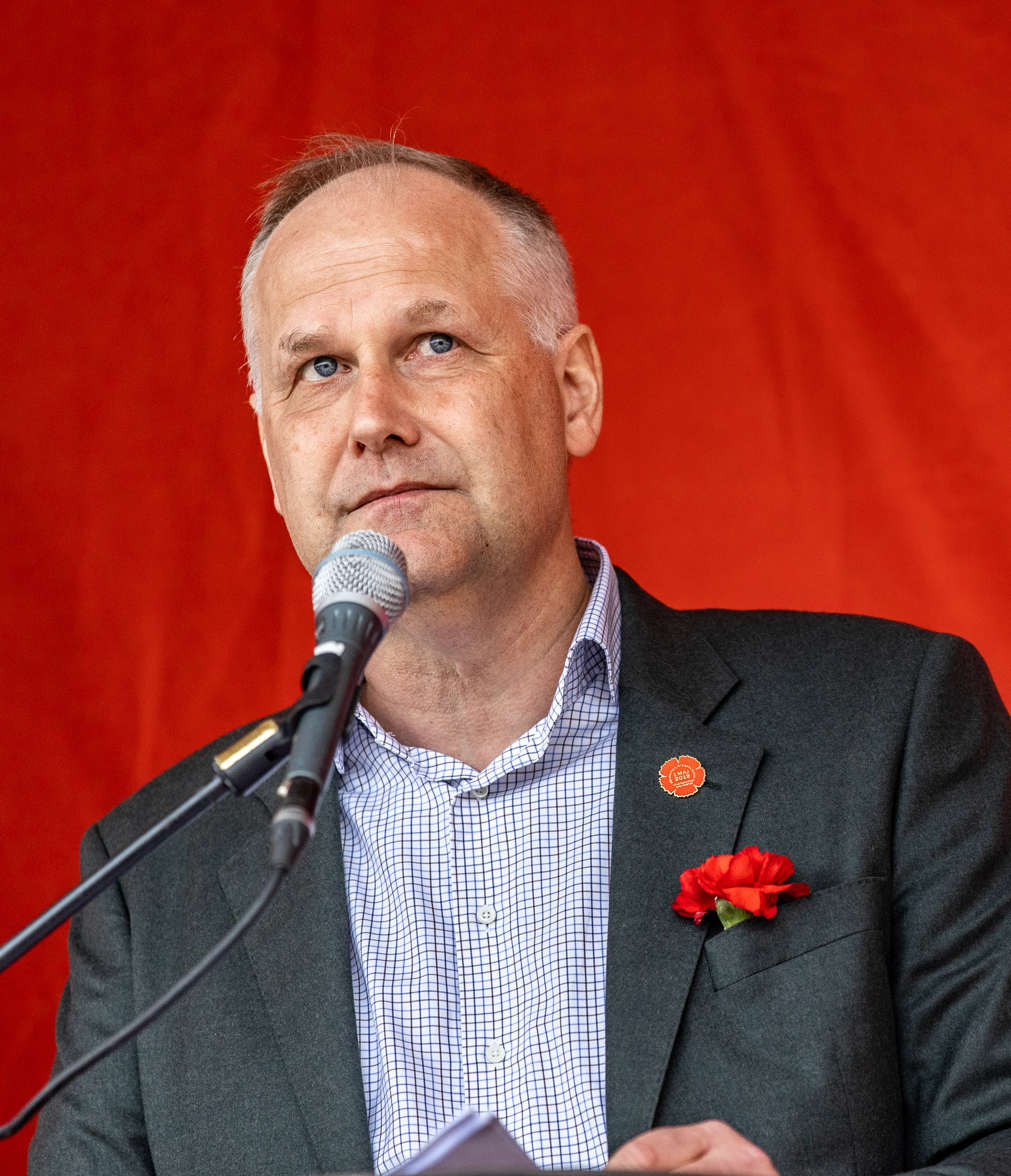

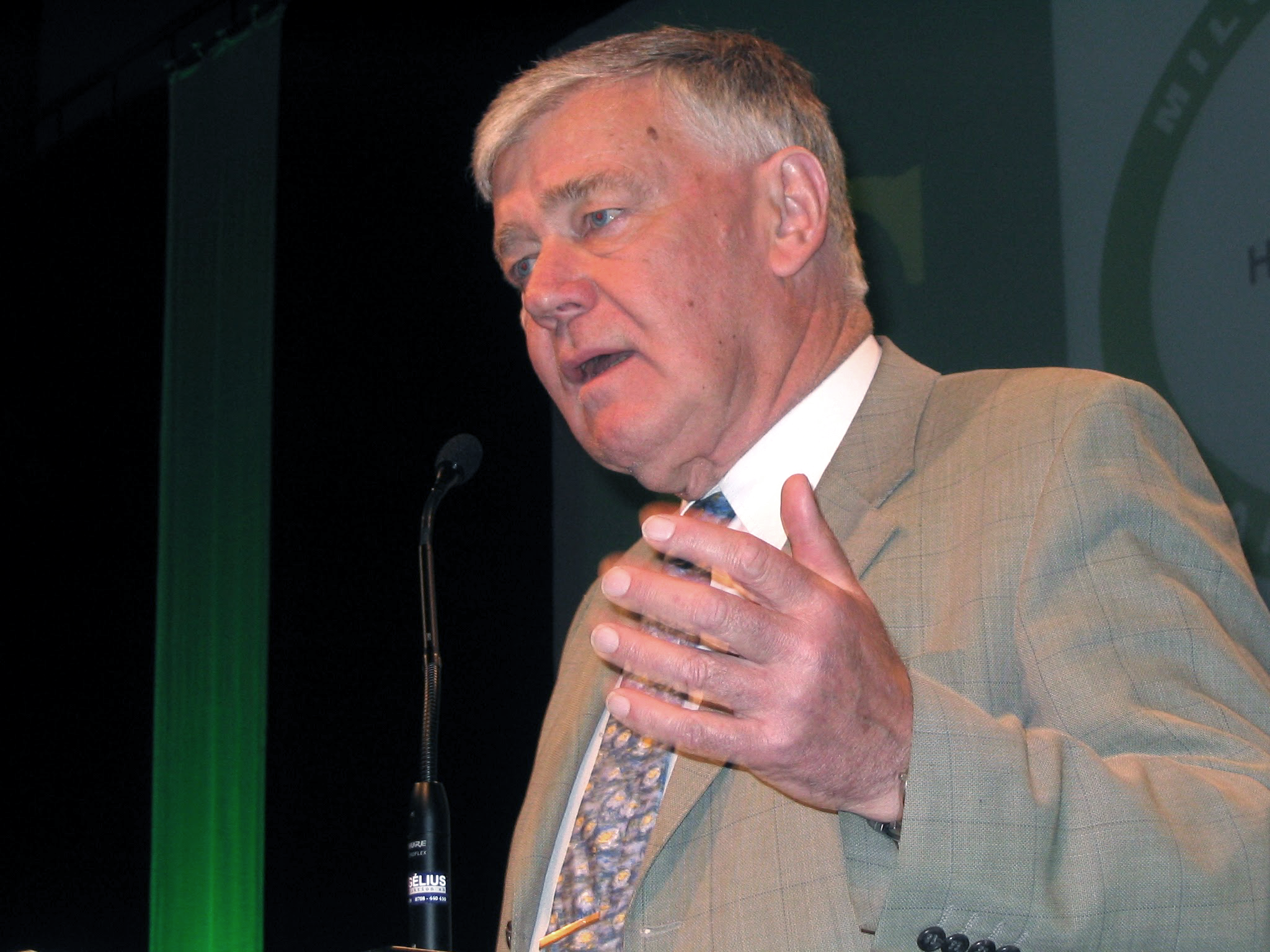

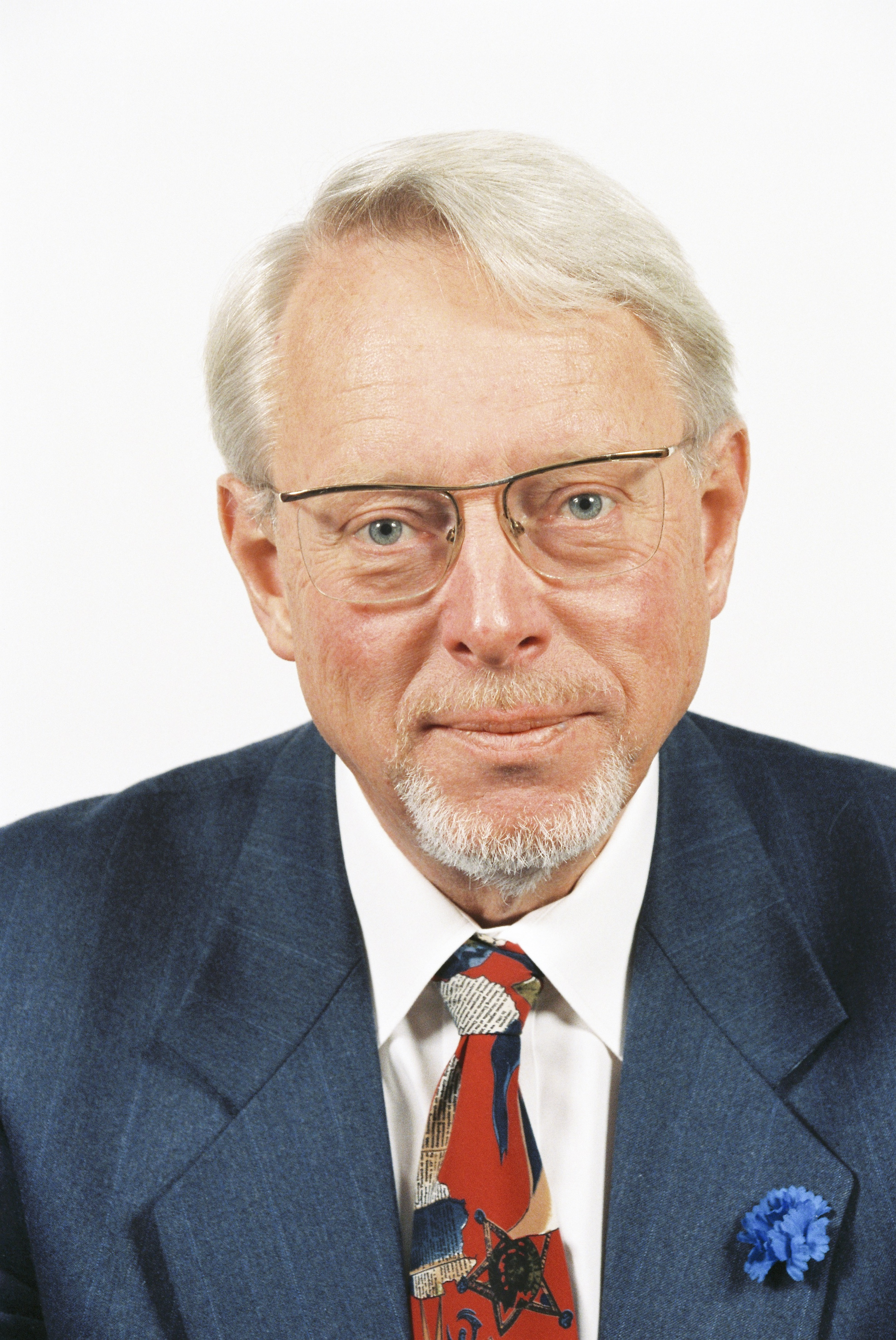
	First party	Second party	Third party
Leader	Maj Britt Theorin; Maj-Lis Lööw	Staffan Burenstam Linder	Per Gahrton
Party	Social Democrats	Moderate	Green
Alliance	PES	EPP	G
Seats won	7	5	4
Popular vote	752,817	621,568	462,092
Percentage	28.06%	23.17%	17.22%
	Fourth party	Fifth party	Sixth party
Leader	Jonas Sjöstedt	Karl Erik Olsson	Hadar Cars
Party	Left	Centre	Liberals
Alliance	GUE/NGL	ALDE	ALDE
Seats won	3	2	1
Popular vote	346,764	192,077	129,376
Percentage	12.92%	7.16%	4.82%

The 1995 European Parliament election in Sweden was the election of Members of the European Parliament representing the Sweden constituency for the 1995–1999 term of the European Parliament.

Austria, Finland and Sweden acceded to the Union on 1 January 1995. 59 delegates (21 from Austria, 16 from Finland, 22 from Sweden) were appointed to the Parliament on accession, bringing the total up to 626. Elections to elect the 22 MEPs for Sweden were held on 17 September 1995 and the now-elected MEPs took their seats with effect from 9 October 1995.

The Swedish Social Democratic Party won these elections, They have won every European parliament election since, as of 2024.

== Results by group ==
The map shows which European party group received the most votes in each municipality

The results by political group of the Sweden election were as follows:

Group	Before election 16 September 1995		Election 17 September 1995	After election 9 October 1995		See also
PES	11	Birgitta Ahlqvist; Axel Andersson; Jan Andersson; Reynoldh Furustrand; Inga-Britt Johansson; Maj-Lis Lööw; Kristina Persson; Bengt-Ola Ryttar; Yvonne Sandberg-Fries; Maj Britt Theorin; Tommy Waidelich;	−4	7	Birgitta Ahlqvist; Jan Andersson; Anneli Hulthén; Maj-Lis Lööw; Maj Britt Theorin; Tommy Waidelich; Sören Wibe;	
ELDR	3	Hadar Cars; Karl Erik Olsson; Karin Starrin;	+0	3	Hadar Cars; Hans Lindqvist; Karl Erik Olsson;	
EPP	6	Charlotte Cederschiöld; Karin Falkmer; Holger Gustafsson; Per Stenmarck; Margaretha af Ugglas; Ivar Virgin;	−1	5	Staffan Burenstam Linder; Gunilla Carlsson; Charlotte Cederschiöld; Per Stenmarck; Ivar Virgin;	
UFE	–	–	+0	–	–	
EUL/NGL	1	Bengt Hurtig;	+2	3	Marianne Eriksson; Jonas Sjöstedt; Jörn Svensson;	
G	1	Per Gahrton;	+3	4	Per Gahrton; Ulf Holm; MaLou Lindholm; Inger Schörling;	
ERA	–	–	+0	–	–	
EN	–	–	+0	–	–	
NI	–	–	+0	–	–	
Total	22		+0	22		

== Results ==
Party	Votes	%	Seats
Swedish Social Democratic Party	752,817	28.06	7
Moderate Party	621,568	23.17	5
Green Party	462,092	17.22	4
Left Party	346,764	12.92	3
Centre Party	192,077	7.16	2
Liberal People's Party	129,376	4.82	1
Christian Democrats	105,173	3.92	0
Sarajevo List	26,875	1.00	0
Free EU-Critics	18,398	0.69	0
Justice List	14,904	0.56	0
New Democracy	2,841	0.11	0
Other parties	10,266	0.38	0
Total	2,683,151	100.00	22
Valid votes	2,683,151	98.38	
Invalid/blank votes	44,166	1.62	
Total votes	2,727,317	100.00	
Registered voters/turnout	6,551,781	41.63	
Source: Alexandersson
