= Major (Sweden) =

Swedish military rank

Major Major
- Country: Sweden
- Service branch: Army; Air Force; Navy (Amphibious Corps)
- Abbreviation: Mj (Swedish), Maj (English)
- Rank: Major
- NATO rank code: OF-3
- Non-NATO rank: O-4
- Next higher rank: Lieutenant colonel
- Next lower rank: Captain
- Equivalent ranks: Lieutenant commander

Major (Maj) (Swedish: Major, Mj) is a field grade military officer rank in the Swedish Armed Forces, above the rank of captain and below the rank of lieutenant colonel. It is equivalent to the naval rank of lieutenant commander in the Swedish Navy.

== History ==
The rank of major was introduced in the middle of the 16th century in the Spanish and German armies, and its holders were assigned to the regimental commander. After the introduction of the battalion division, the major was eventually given command of a battalion in all armies, as was the lieutenant colonel. After the division of the regiment was established in Sweden in 1634, each regiment with regimental officers had a colonel (regimental commander), a lieutenant colonel and a major, of whom the latter often commanded the colonel's battalion. Like the 2nd major added in 1757 and the 3rd major added later in several regiments, the major had company commanders position until the 1833 pay regulation. All the regimental officers, with the exception of the regimental commander, were then called majors (1st, 2nd and 3rd major), of whom the 1st major usually had the rank of lieutenant colonel. The 2nd and 3rd major were changed to major in 1875, at the same time as the positions of lieutenant colonel and 1st major were firmly united in the infantry and cavalry; the term 1st major was removed in 1901.

Major has also existed as a rank in the Swedish Navy. During the 17th century, it appeared as a designation for the lowest flag officer rank in the navy.

== Duties ==
The major acts as a commander or deputy battalion commander both in the war organization or in basic training. In staff service, the major works as a section head, head of function or qualified administrator. The major can also serve at schools in various management, teacher and staff positions. The depth of competence can vary depending on time in the position and other abilities. The lower level refers to the start of the position.

== Promotion ==
According to Chapter 2, Section 1 of FFS 2018:7, a person who is eligible for promotion has served in the Swedish Armed Forces to such an extent that assessment of suitability, knowledge and skills could be carried out, is deemed suitable for promotion, possesses the knowledge and skills required for the higher rank, and meets time requirements according to Section 2 (must have held the rank for at least two years).

Promotion of a captain to major may take place when the captain has completed applicable promotion training with approved results. After completing a tactical staff course at the Swedish Defence University, a captain who is OFSK may only be promoted to major if the position is within the functional area where the captain's special competence is and the position's rank code is OF 3. Promotion of a major to lieutenant colonel may take place when the major has completed the applicable promotion training with approved results. Responsible head of promotion to major is the unit commander.

In the case of reserve officers, promotion of a captain to major may take place when the captain has completed applicable promotion training with approved results. Promotion to positions higher than major may take place after placement until further notice in a position at a higher position level than that corresponding to the individual's current rank, provided that the officer in the reserve has an academic degree at advanced level.

== Rank insignia ==
=== Collar patches ===
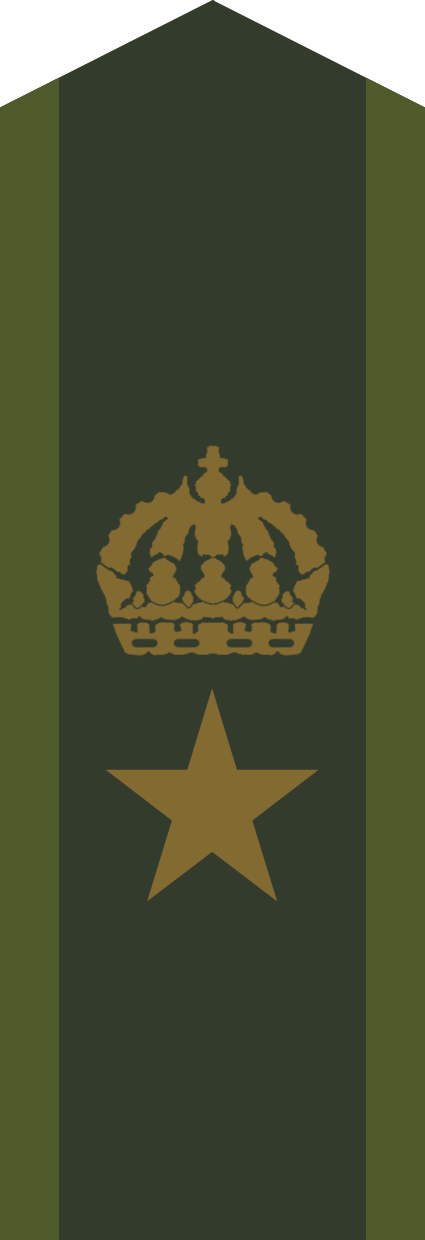
Collar patch m/58 for a major

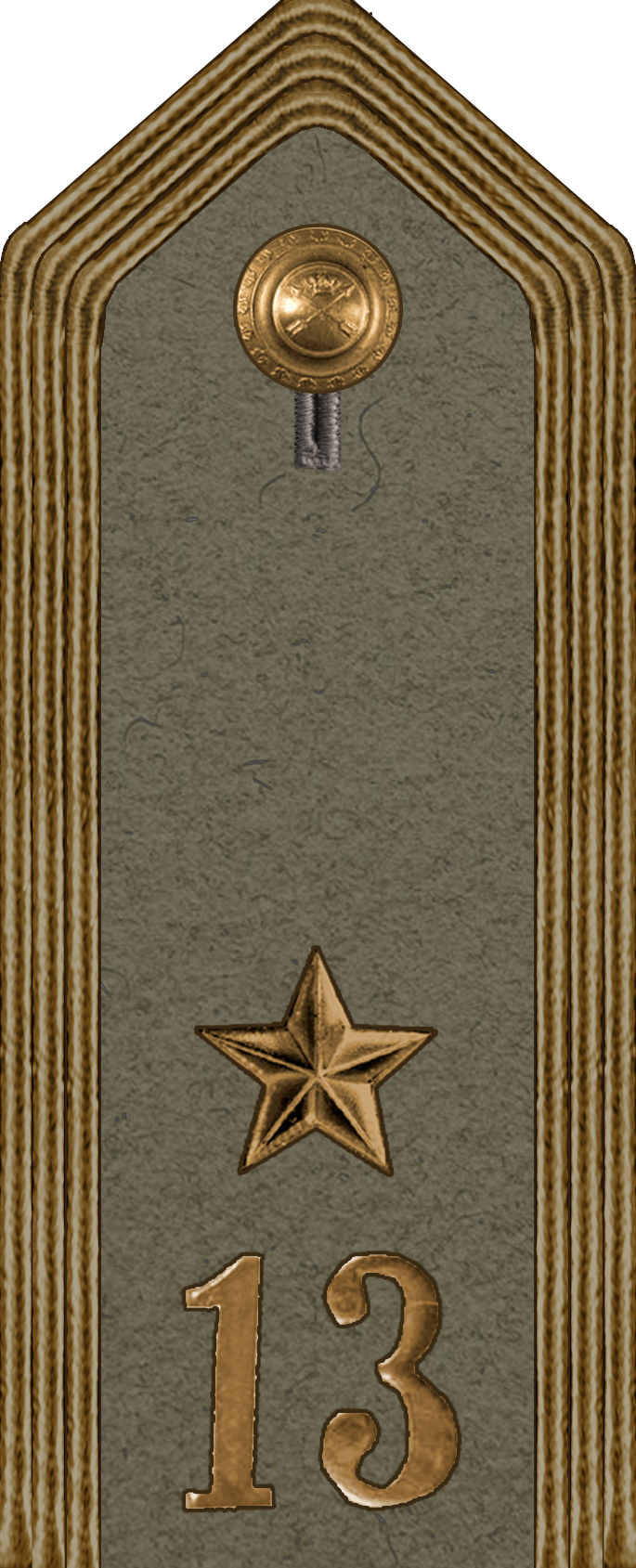
Collar patch

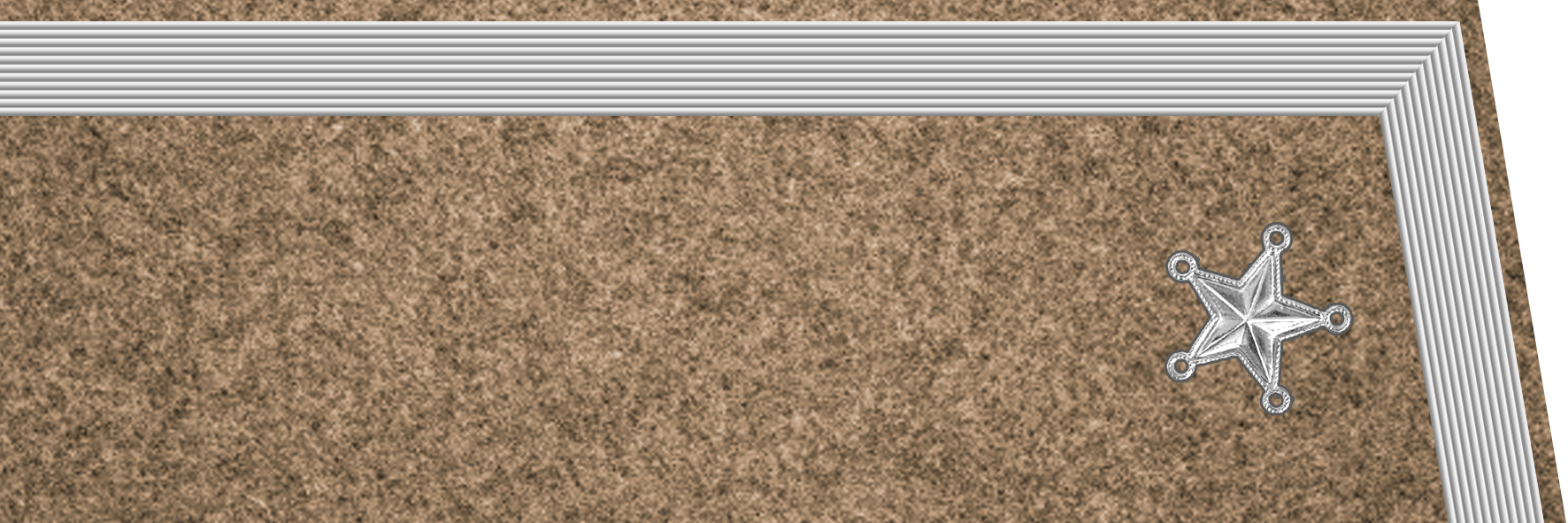
Collar patch

=== Shoulder marks ===
==== Air Force ====
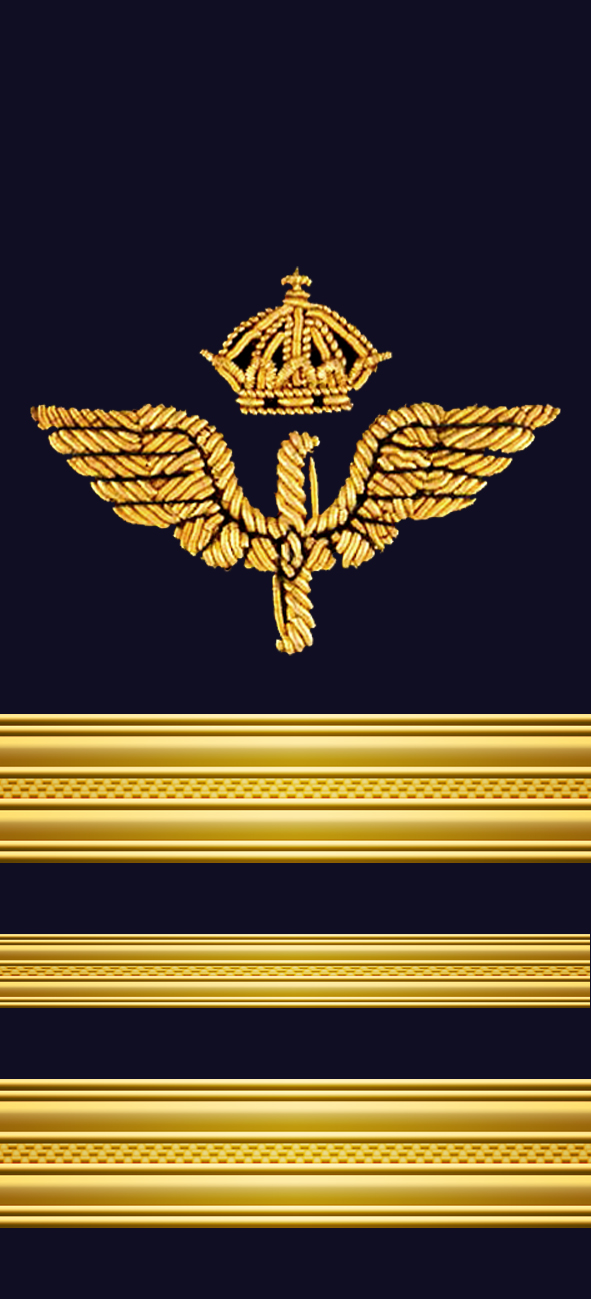
(2003–present)

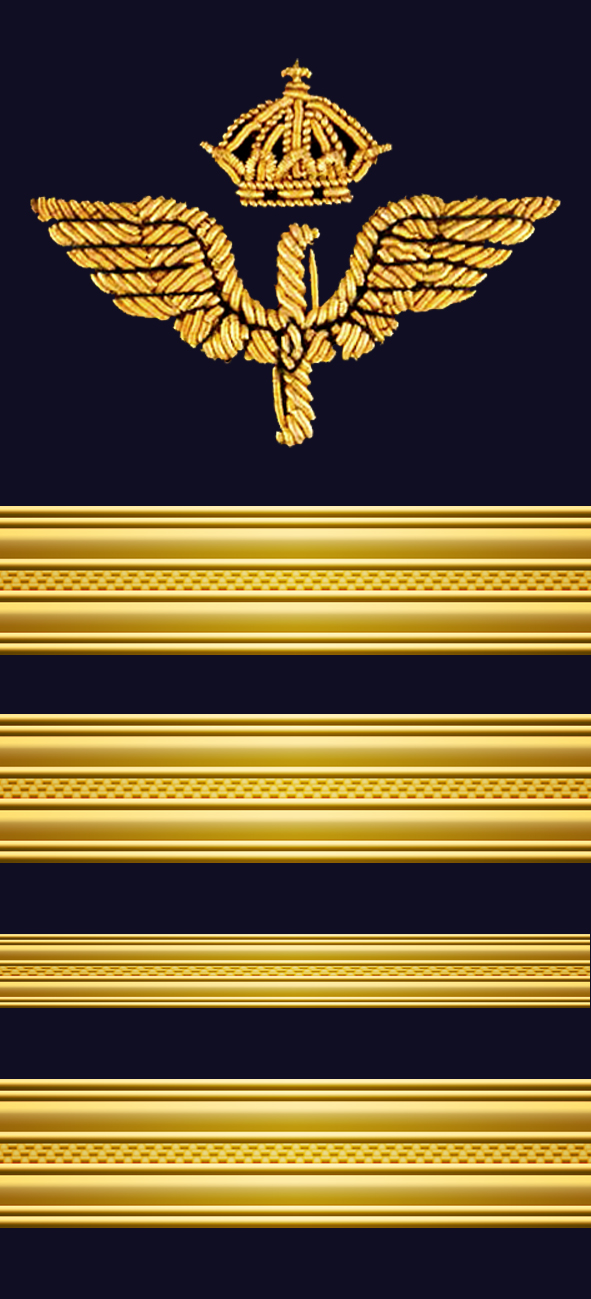
(–2003)

==== Army ====
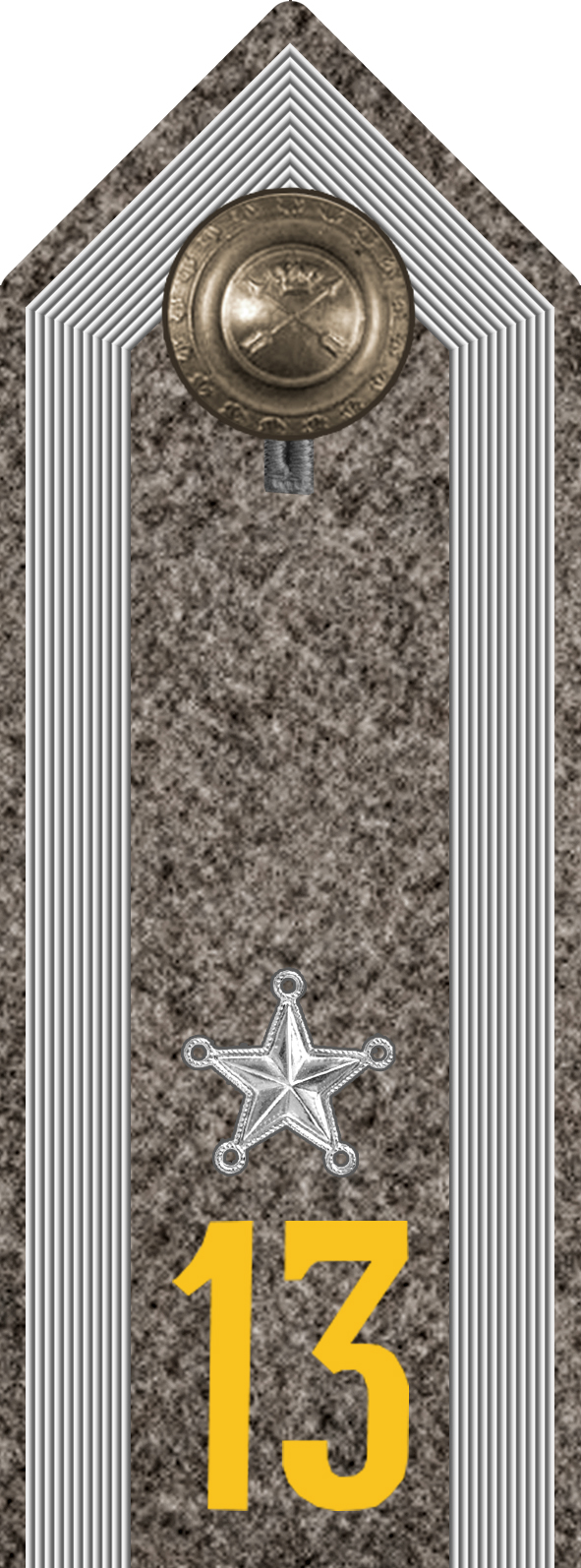
Shoulder mark m/1923
(13 = Dalarna Regiment)

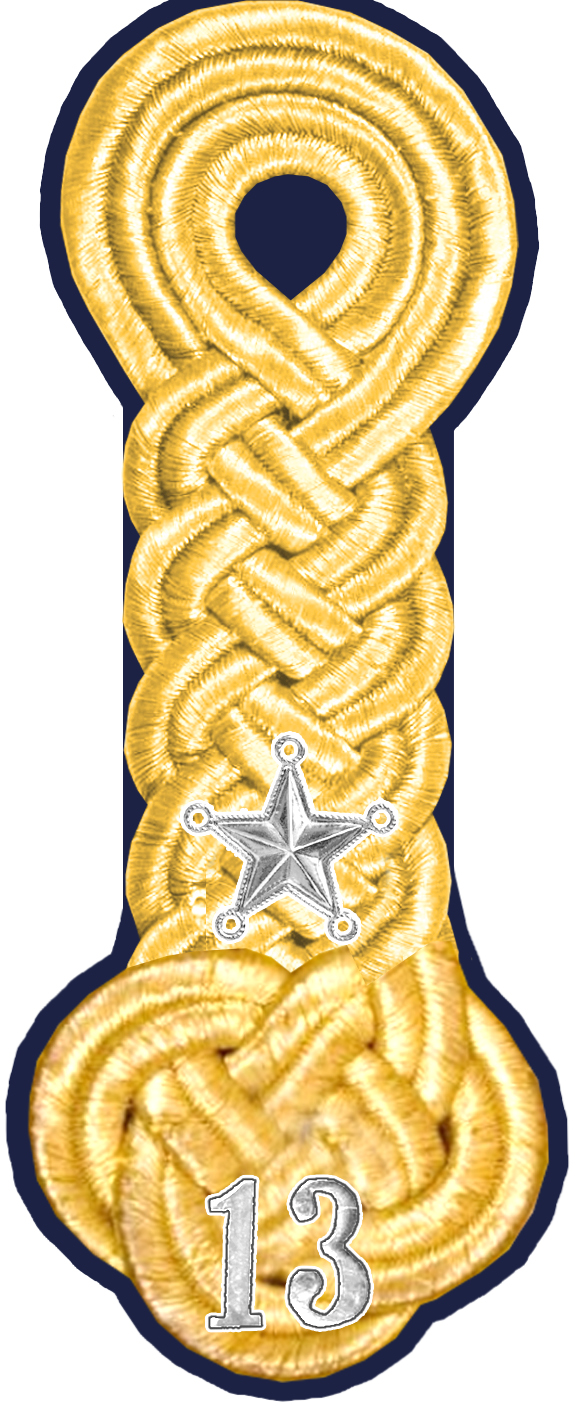
Shoulder mark m/1910
(13 = Dalarna Regiment)

==== Navy (Amphibious Corps) ====
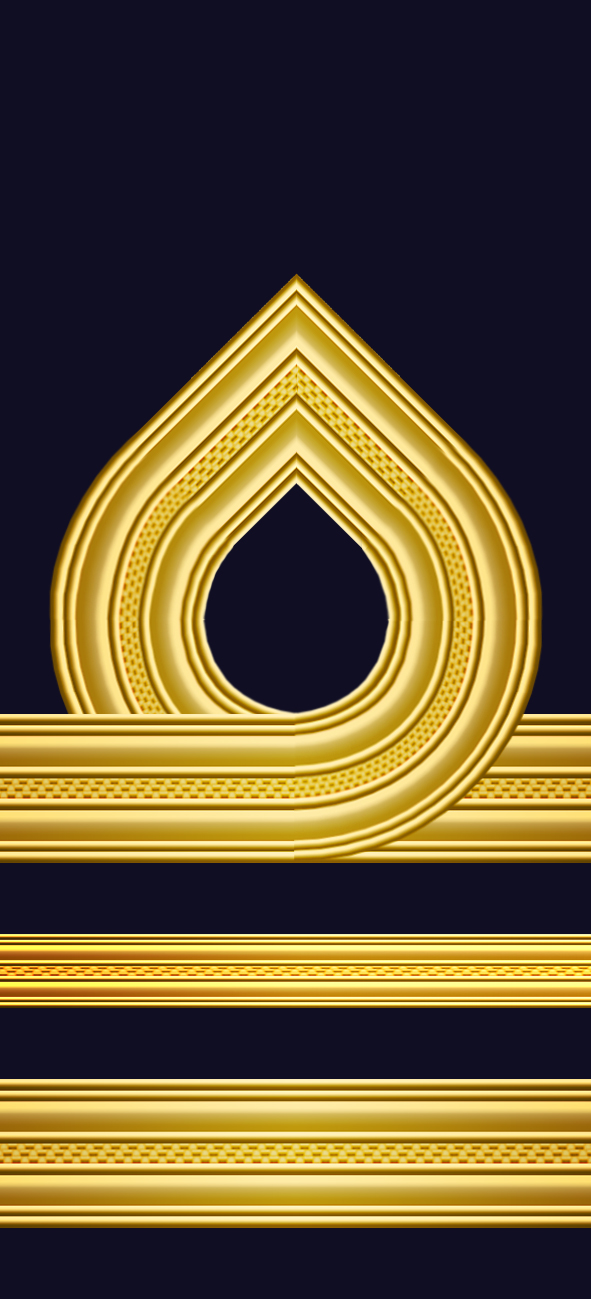
Embroidered shoulder mark (Navy)
(2003–present)

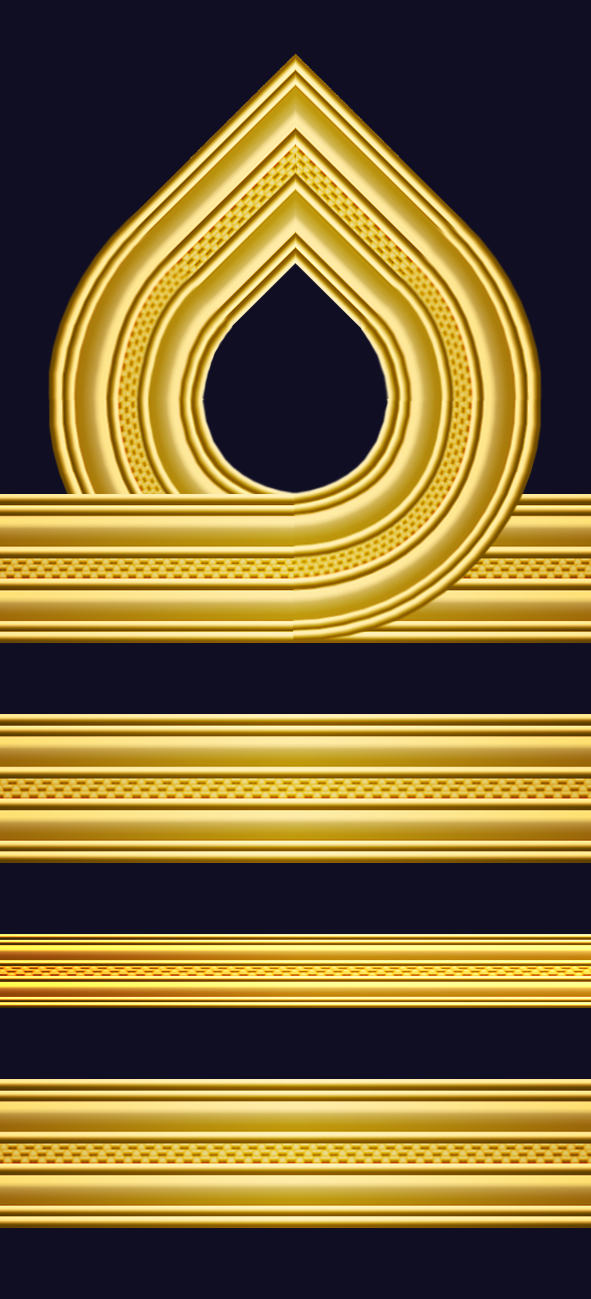
Embroidered shoulder mark (Navy)
(–2003)

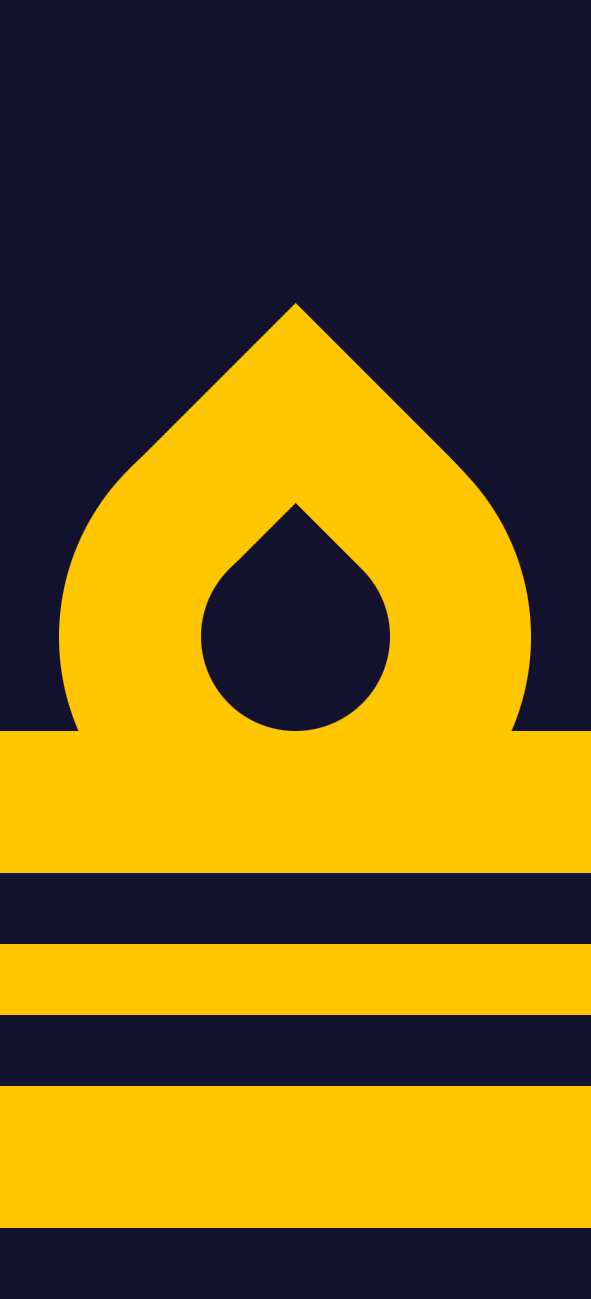
Wowen shoulder mark (2003–present)

=== Sleeve insignias ===
==== Air Force ====
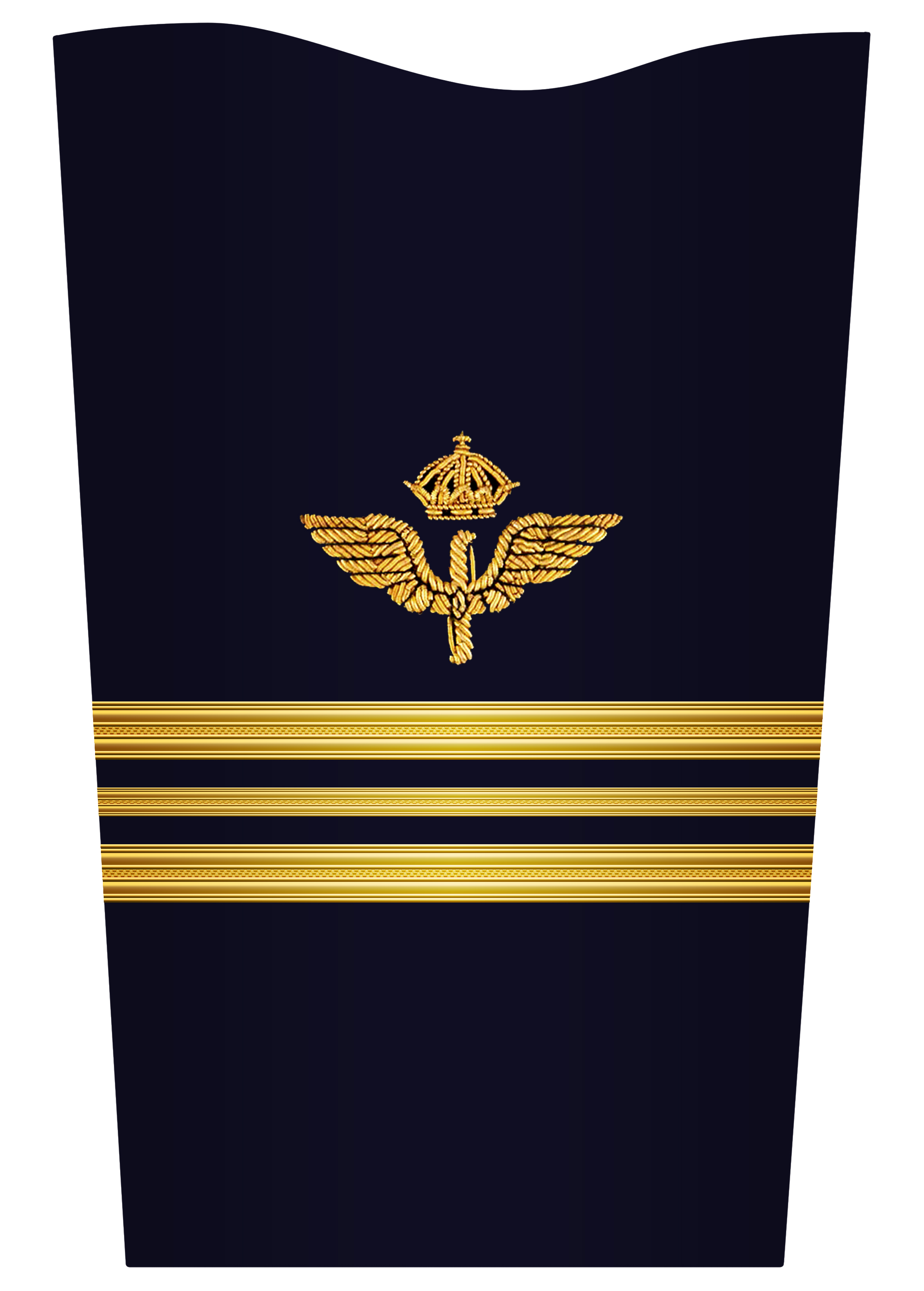
Mess jacket sleeve insignia for a major
(2003–present)

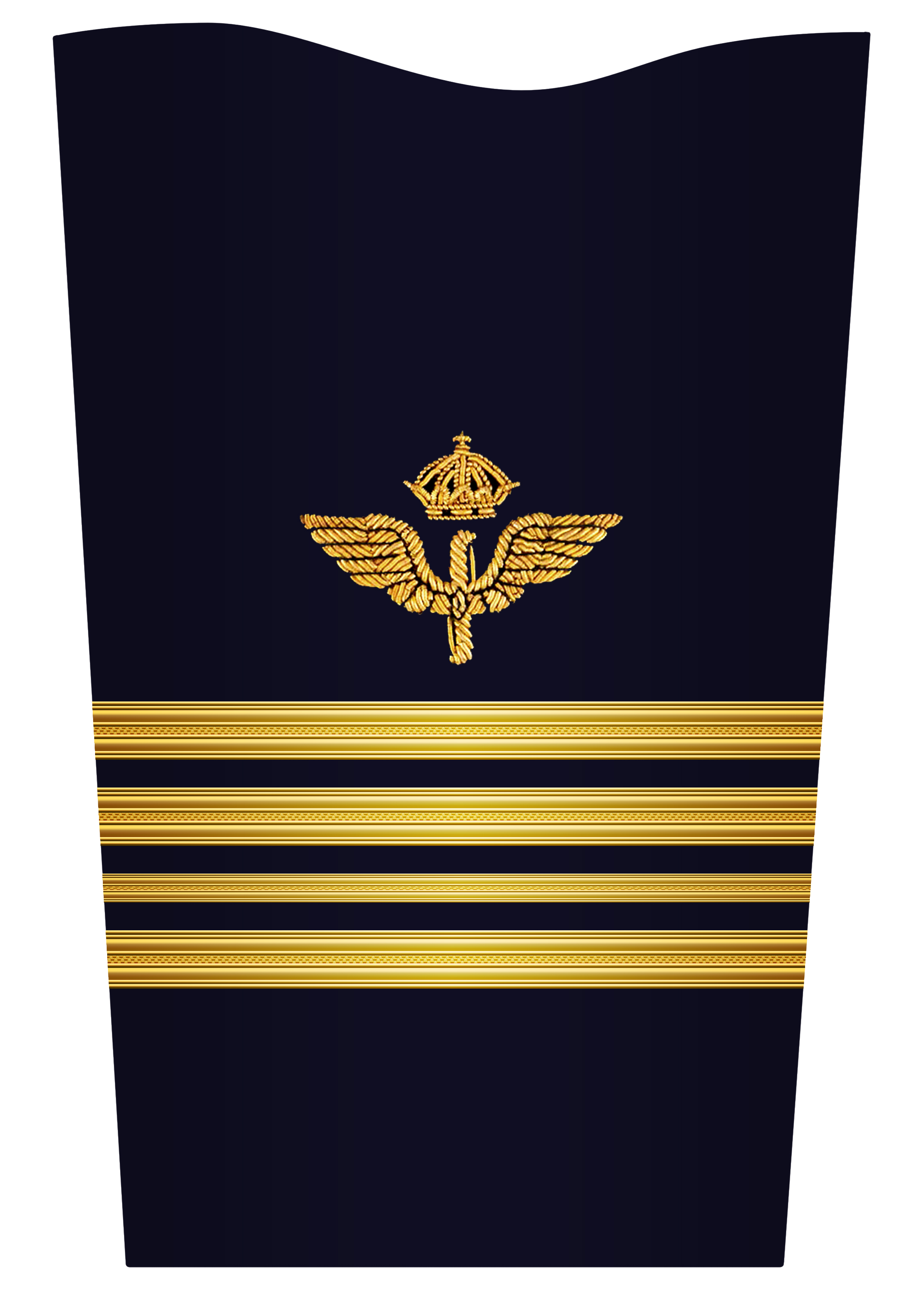
Mess jacket sleeve insignia for a major
(–2003)

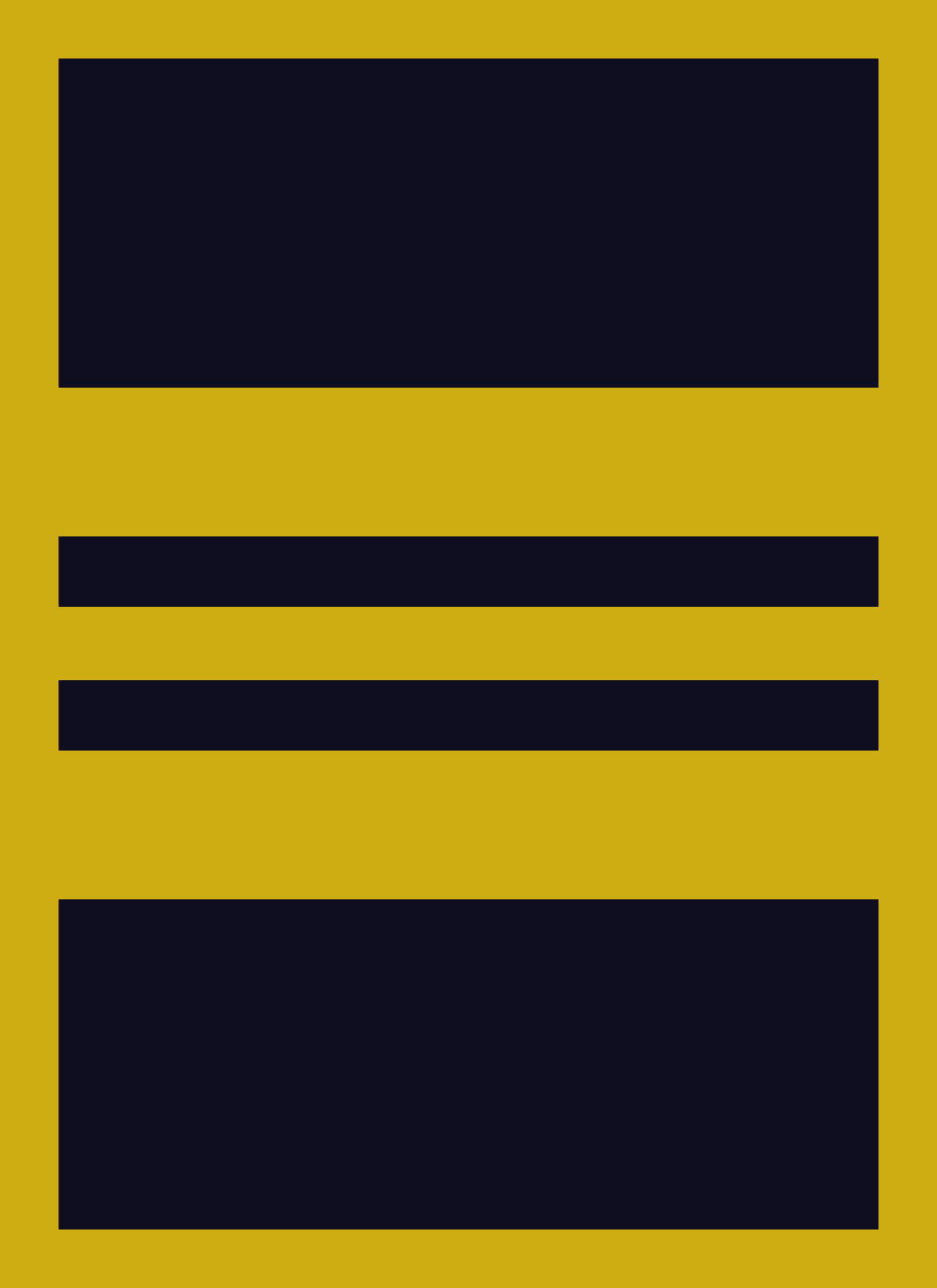
Flight suit sleeve insignia for a major
(2003–present)

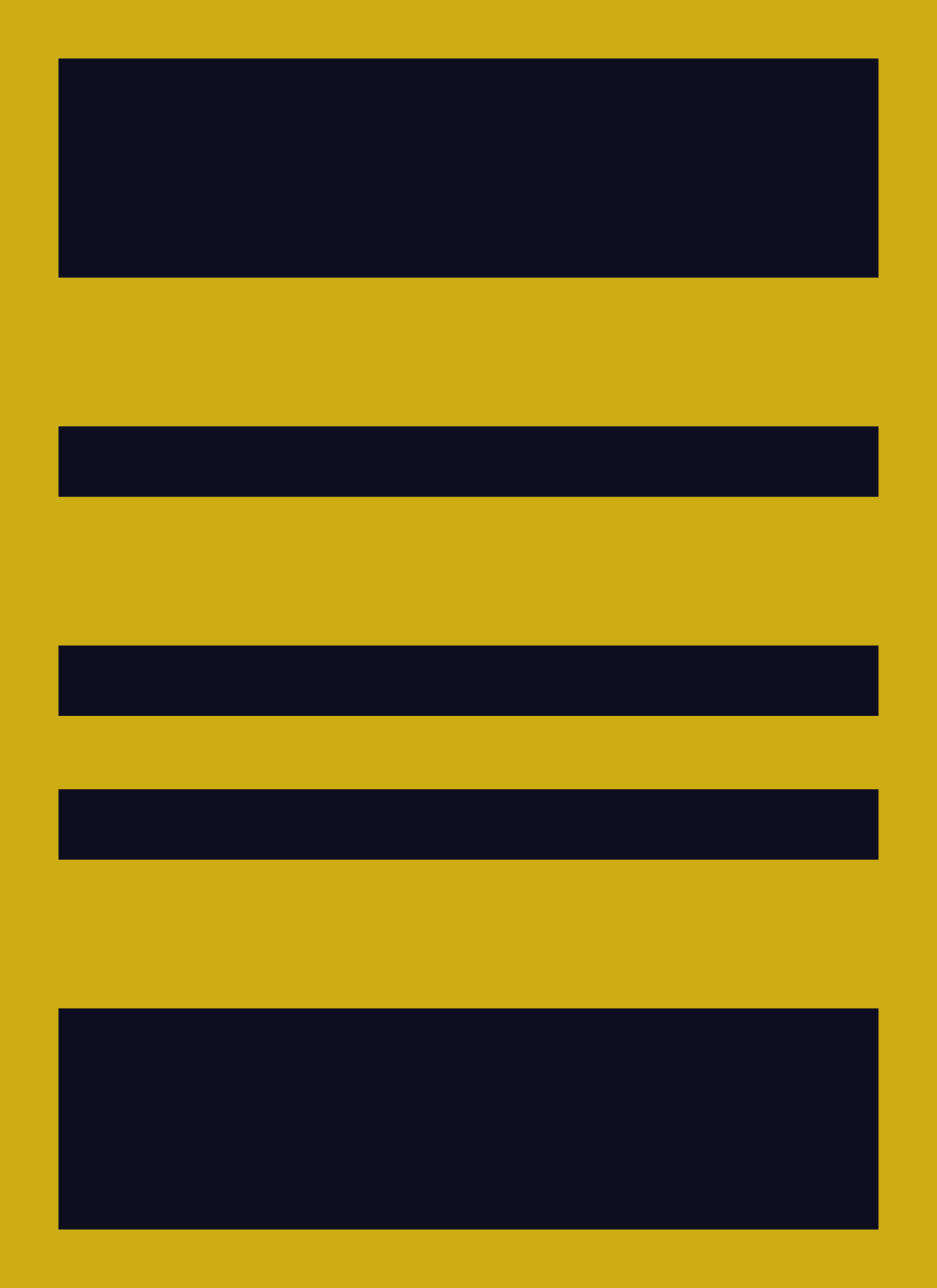
Flight suit sleeve insignia for a major
(–2003)

==== Army ====
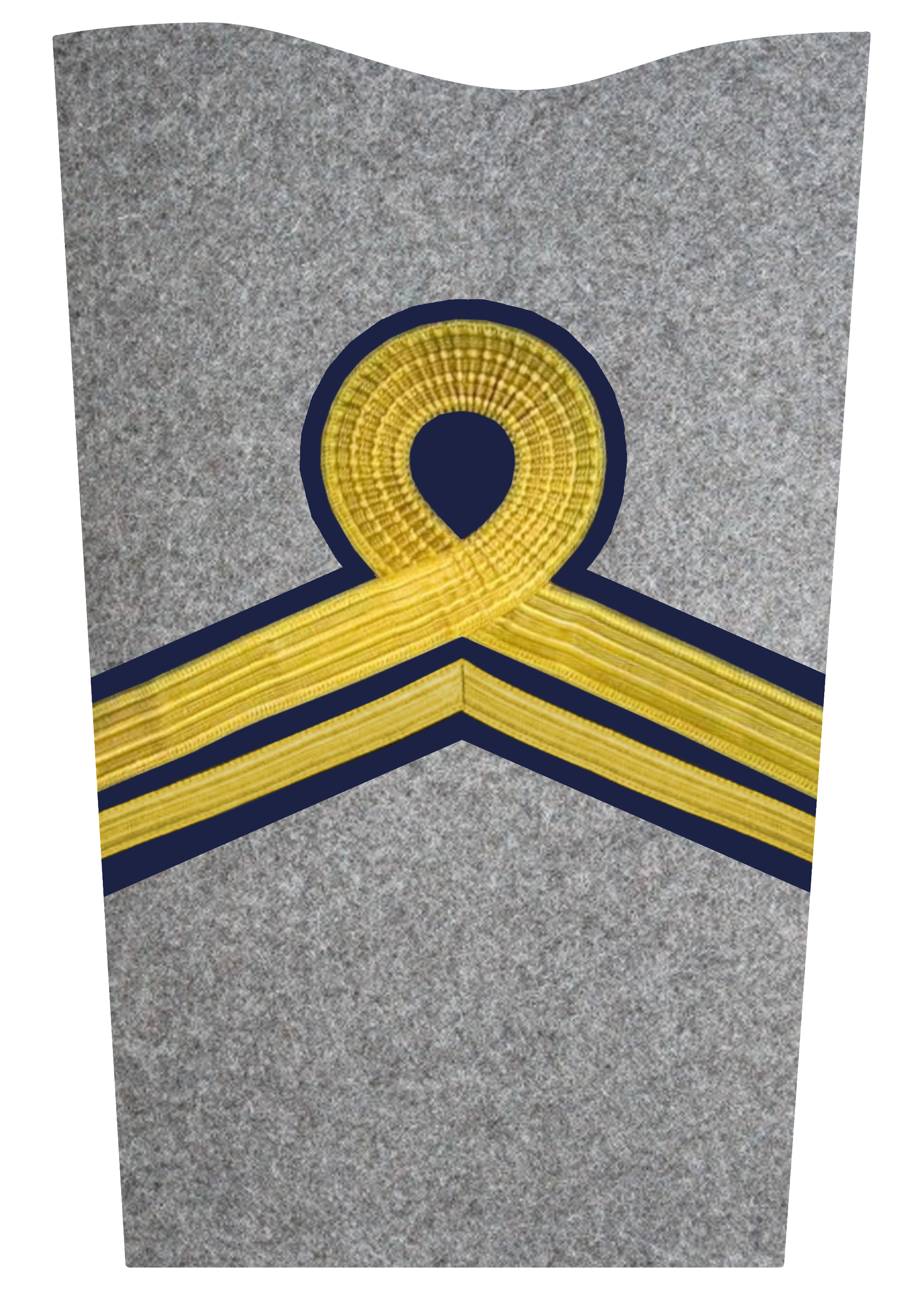
Sleeve insignia on uniform m/1906 for a major.

==== Navy (Amphibious Corps) ====
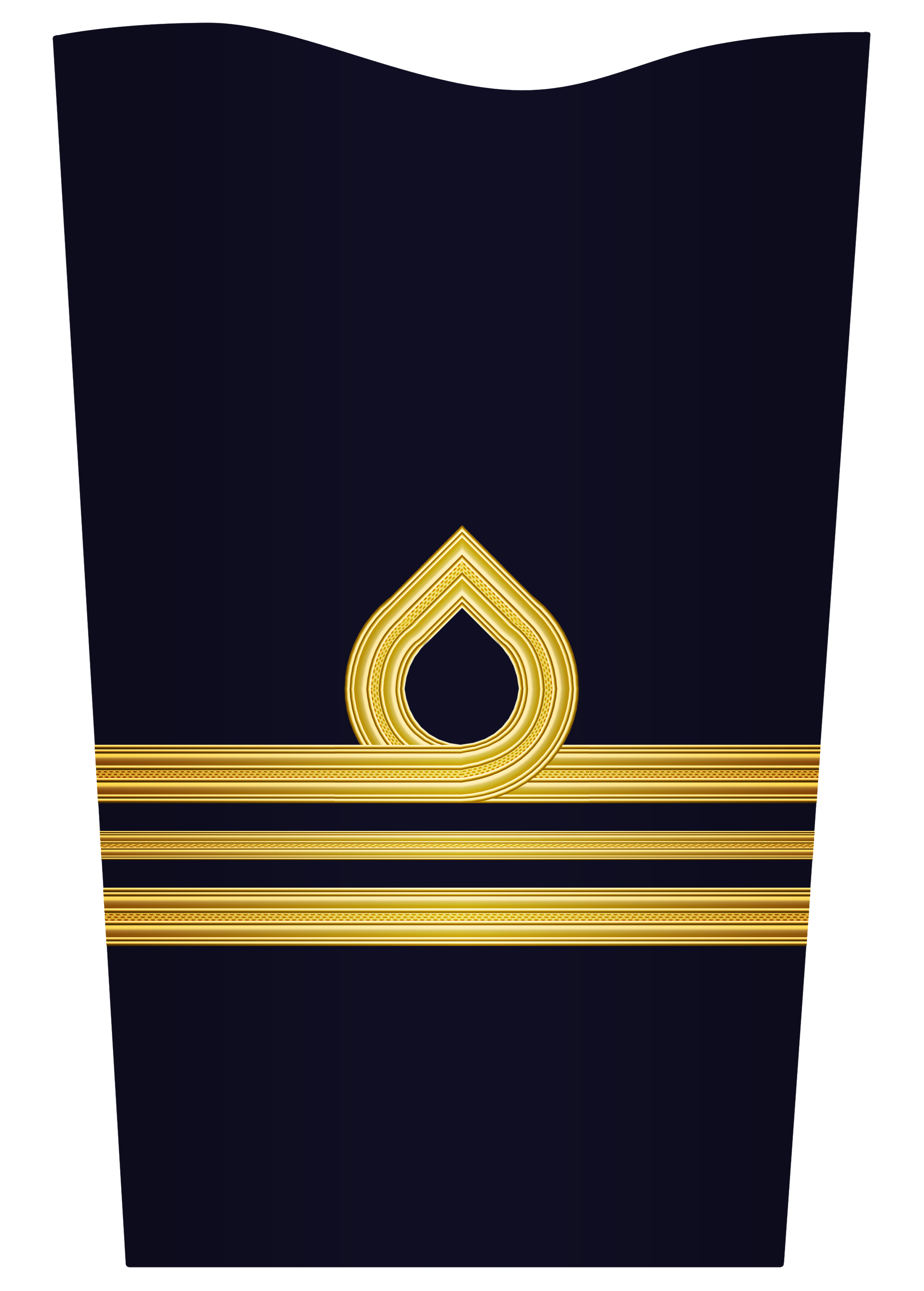
Sleeve insignia on innerkavaj m/48 ("inner jacket m/48") for a major.
(2003–present)

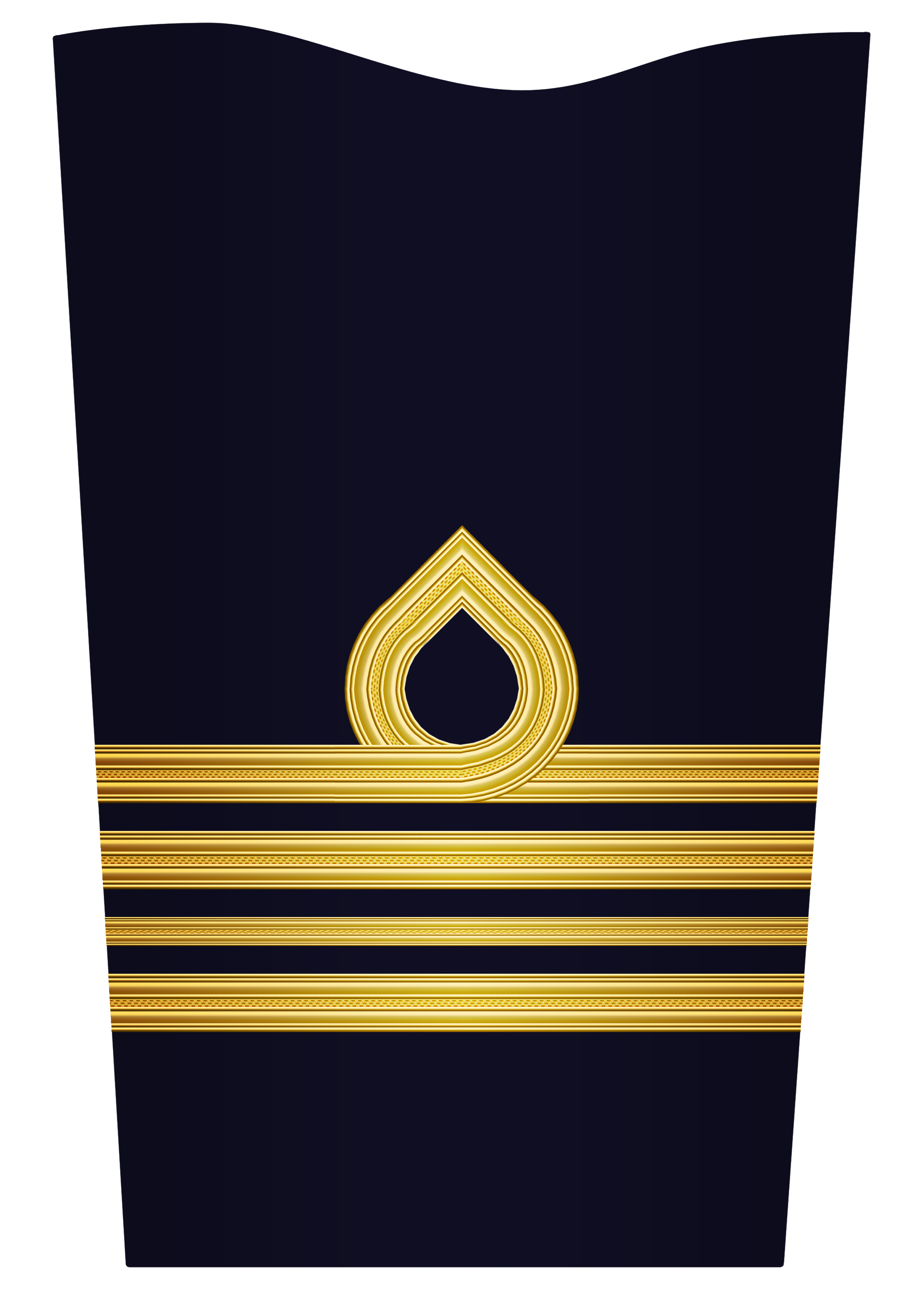
Sleeve insignia on innerkavaj m/48 ("inner jacket m/48") for a major.
(–2003)

=== Hats ===
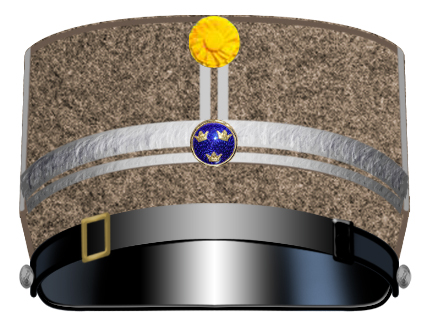
Hat (Mössa m/1923) for a major.

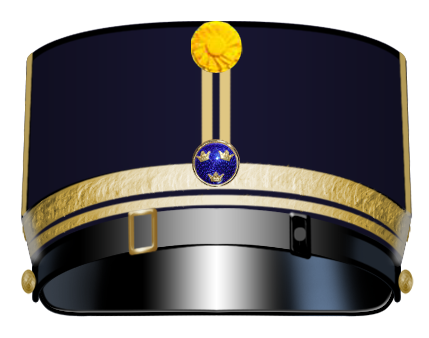
Camp hat (Lägermössa m/1865-99) for a major.

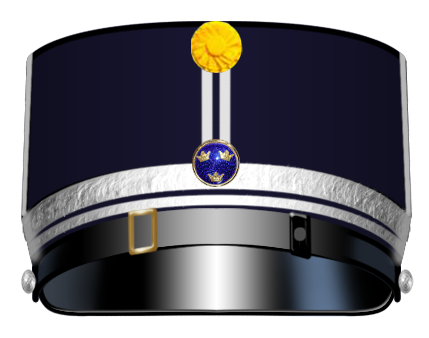
Hat (Mössa m/1865-99) for a major in Life Guards infantry.

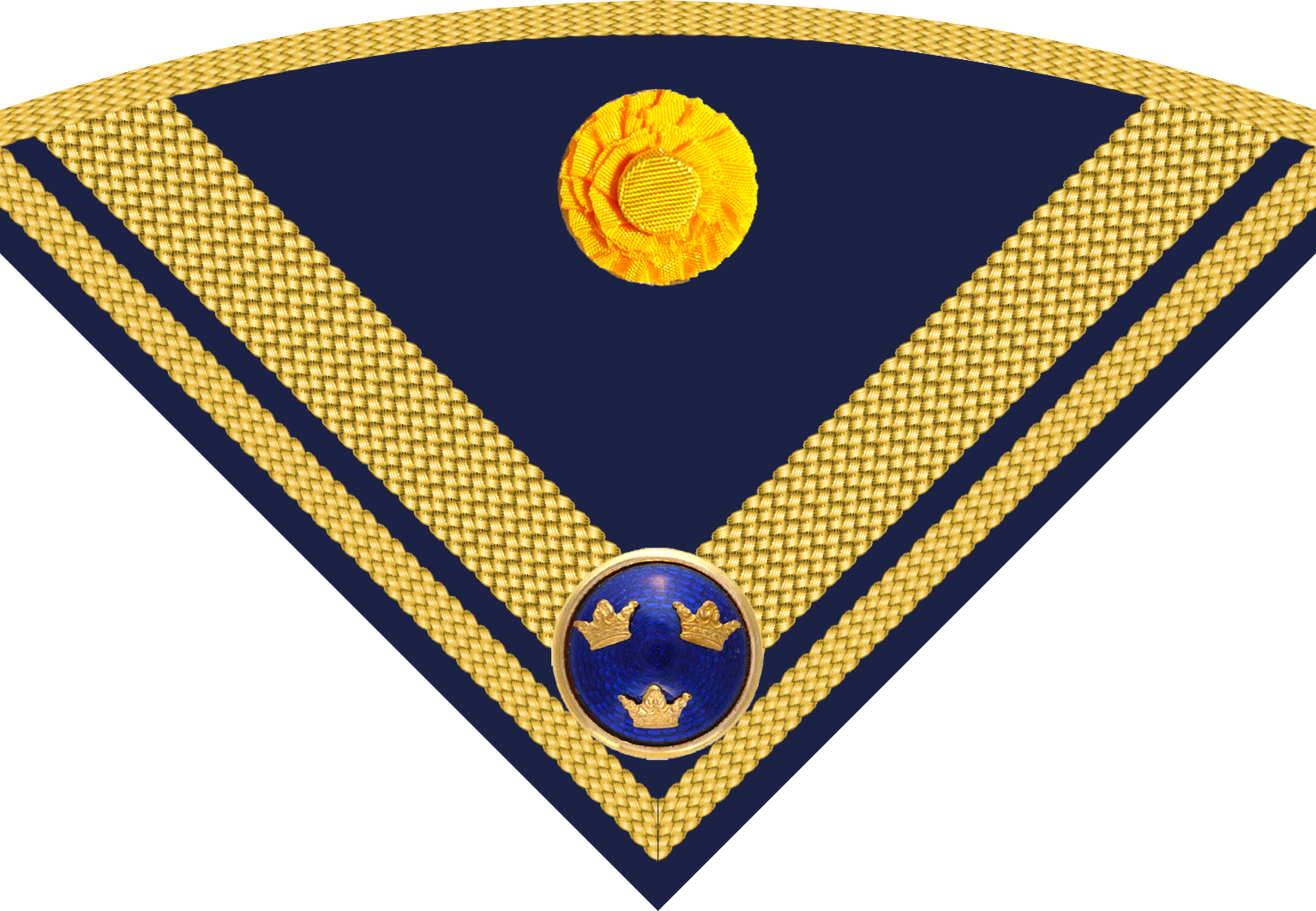
Rank insignia for a major on hat (Hatt m/1910-14) in the army.
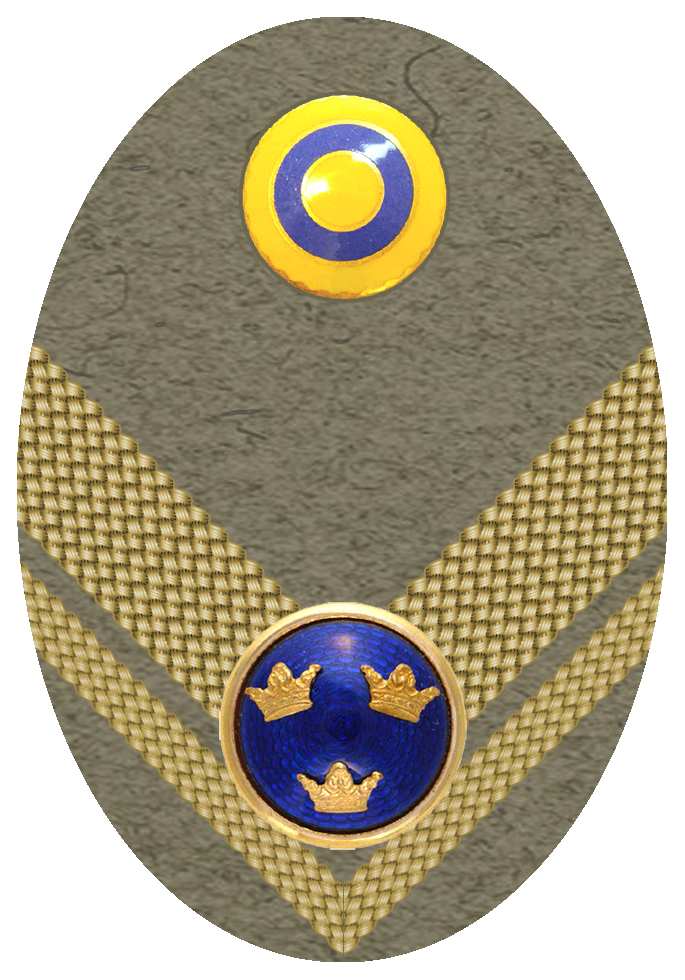
Hat badge (Mössmärke m/1946) for a major in the army.

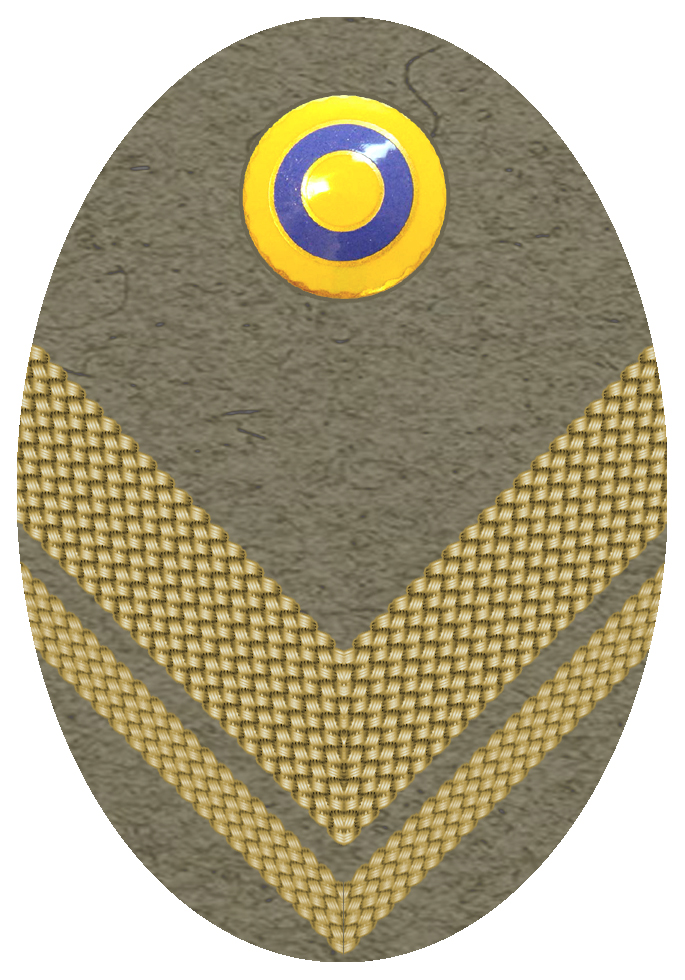
Hat badge (Mössmärke m/1940) for a major in the army.

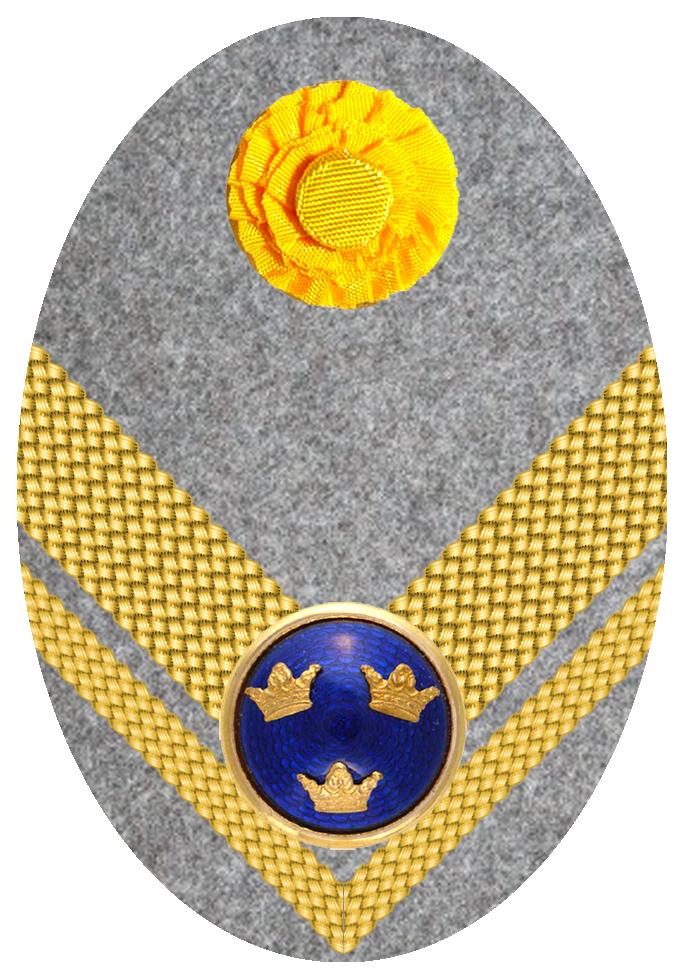
Hat badge (Mössmärke m/1914) for a major in the army on fur hat (pälsmössa m/1909-14).
