= Sarajevo List =

Swedish electoral list

The Sarajevo List (in Swedish: Sarajevolistan) was a political project in Sweden launched ahead of the 1995 European Parliament elections. The group contested the elections, with the intention of "giving a voice to Bosnia" in the European Parliament. The Sarajevo List urged Western countries to intervene in favour of the Bosnian Muslims in the ongoing Bosnian War. The party also supported enlargement of the EU and argued for a more generous refugee policy.

Leading figures of the Sarajevo List were Wilhelm Agrell, Per Svensson, Bibi Andersson, Jesús Alcalá and Maciej Zaremba.

In the elections the Sarajevo List got 26,875 votes (1%), but failed to win any seats.

The Sarajevo List decided not to run in the 1999 European Parliament election.
