= Örlogskapten =

Rank in the Swedish Navy

Lieutenant commander Örlogskapten
- Pennant of the lieutenant commander, Swedish Navy.

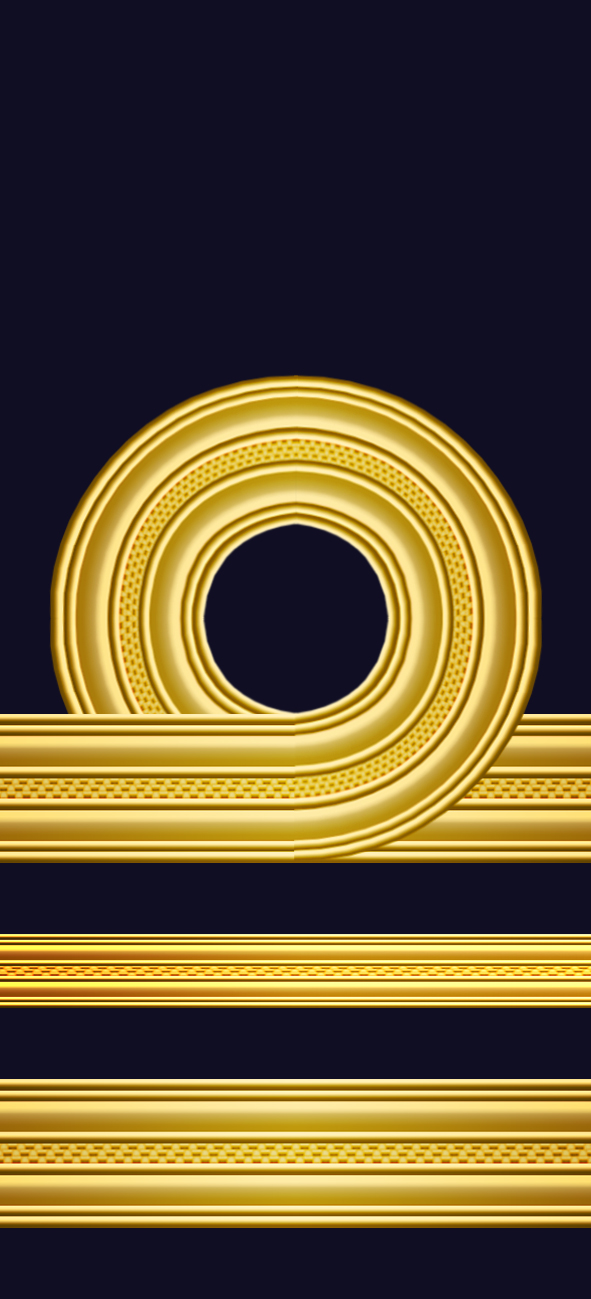
- Shoulder mark of a Swedish lieutenant commander.

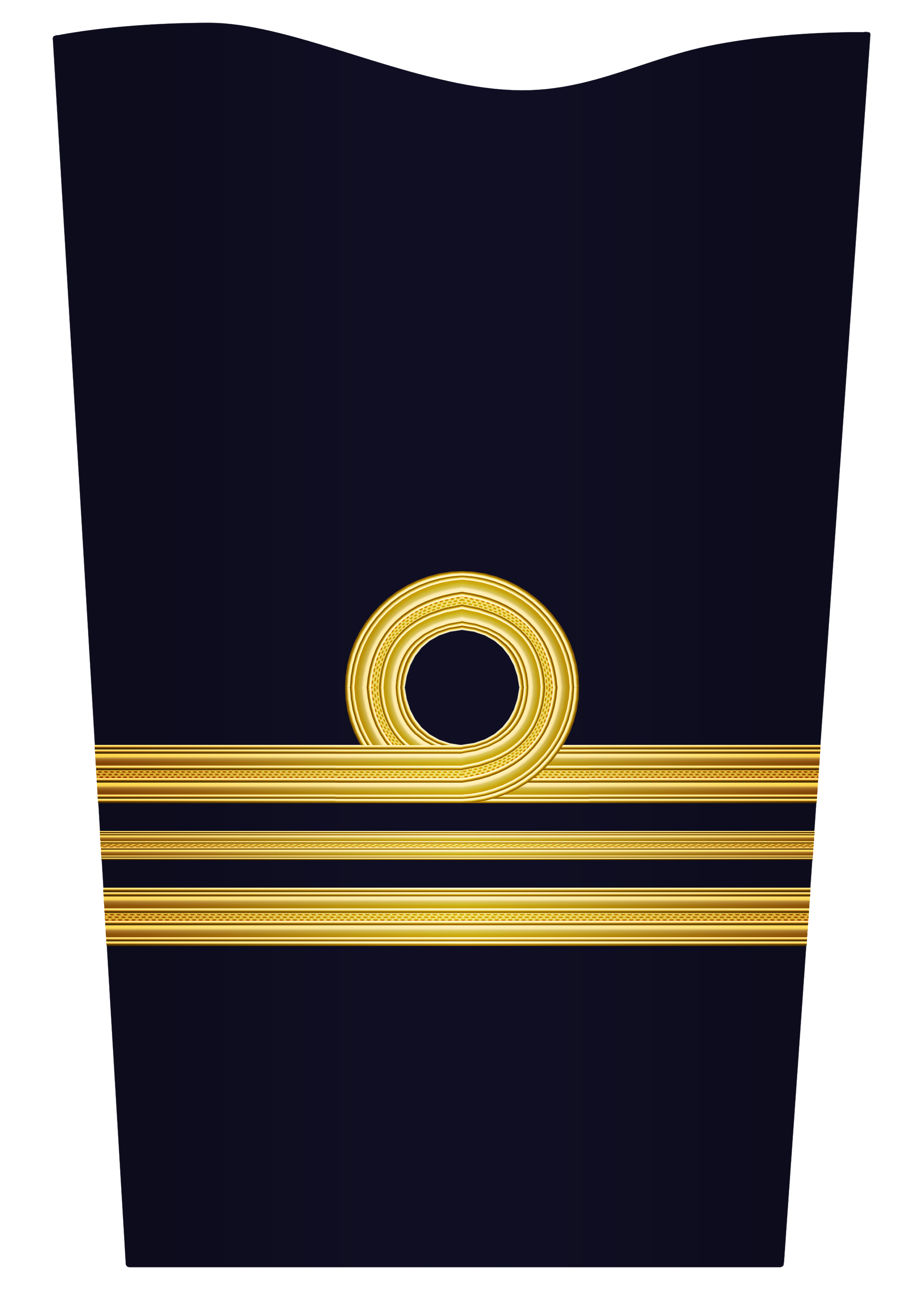
- Sleeve insignia of a Swedish lieutenant commander.
- Country: Sweden
- Service branch: Swedish Navy
- Abbreviation: Örlkn (Swedish), LtCdr (English)
- Rank: Lieutenant commander
- NATO rank code: OF-03
- Non-NATO rank: O-4
- Formation: 1972
- Next higher rank: Commander
- Next lower rank: Lieutenant
- Equivalent ranks: Major

Örlogskapten (lit. 'War captain' (Note: Steming from the Middle Low German word for war (orloch), i.e. war[-ship] captain.) transl. Lieutenant commander) is a mid-ranking officer rank in the Swedish Navy. Lieutenant commanders rank above lieutenants and below commanders, and rank is equivalent to a major in the Swedish Army, Swedish Air Force and the Swedish Amphibious Corps. Before 1972, the rank of örlogskapten was called kommendörkapten av 2:a graden/klassen.

== History ==
The rank of örlogskapten was created in 1972. Before 1972, the rank of lieutenant commander corresponded to the rank of kommendörkapten av 2:a graden/klassen in the Swedish Navy.

== Promotion ==
Promotion of a lieutenant to lieutenant commander may take place when the lieutenant has completed applicable promotion training with approved results. After completing a tactical staff course at the Swedish Defence University, a lieutenant who is OFSK may only be promoted to lieutenant commander if the position is within the functional area where the lieutenant's special competence is and the position's rank code is OF 3. Promotion of a lieutenant commander to the commander may take place when the lieutenant commander has completed the applicable promotion training with approved results. Responsible head of promotion to lieutenant commander is the unit commander.

In the case of reserve officers, promotion of a lieutenant to lieutenant commander may take place when the lieutenant has completed applicable promotion training with approved results. Promotion to positions higher than lieutenant commander may take place after placement until further notice in a position at a higher position level than that corresponding to the individual's current rank, provided that the officer in the reserve has an academic degree at advanced level.

== Uniform ==
=== Shoulder mark ===
The top galloon is shaped like a "loop" for an officer in the Swedish Navy (the loop is shaped like a "grenade" for an officer in the Swedish Amphibious Corps). The rank insignia is worn on the shoulder mark to jacket and coat (jacka m/87, kappa m/87), as well as to blue wool sweater (blå ylletröja m/87), trench coat (trenchcoat m/84), sea coat (sjörock 93, black raincoat and to white shirt (vit skjorta m/78). Rank insignia on shoulder mark (axelklaffshylsa 02B) is worn on all garments with shoulder straps.

1. The shoulder mark (Axelklaffshylsa m/02B) is designed as galloons sewn directly to another shoulder mark (axelklaffshylsa m/87 blå). Since 2003 it consists of three gold galloons.

2. Before 2003, lieutenant commanders wore four gold galloons.

3. The woven shoulder mark (AXELKLAFFSHYLSA M/02 INVÄVD ÖRLOGSKAPTEN FLOTTAN) is worn on the naval combat dress (sjöstridsdräkt m/93), duty uniform (arbetsdräkt m/87 (blå)) and combat uniform (Fältuniform m/90 lätt, m/90 lätt blå, m/90 tropik (green, beige and blue)).

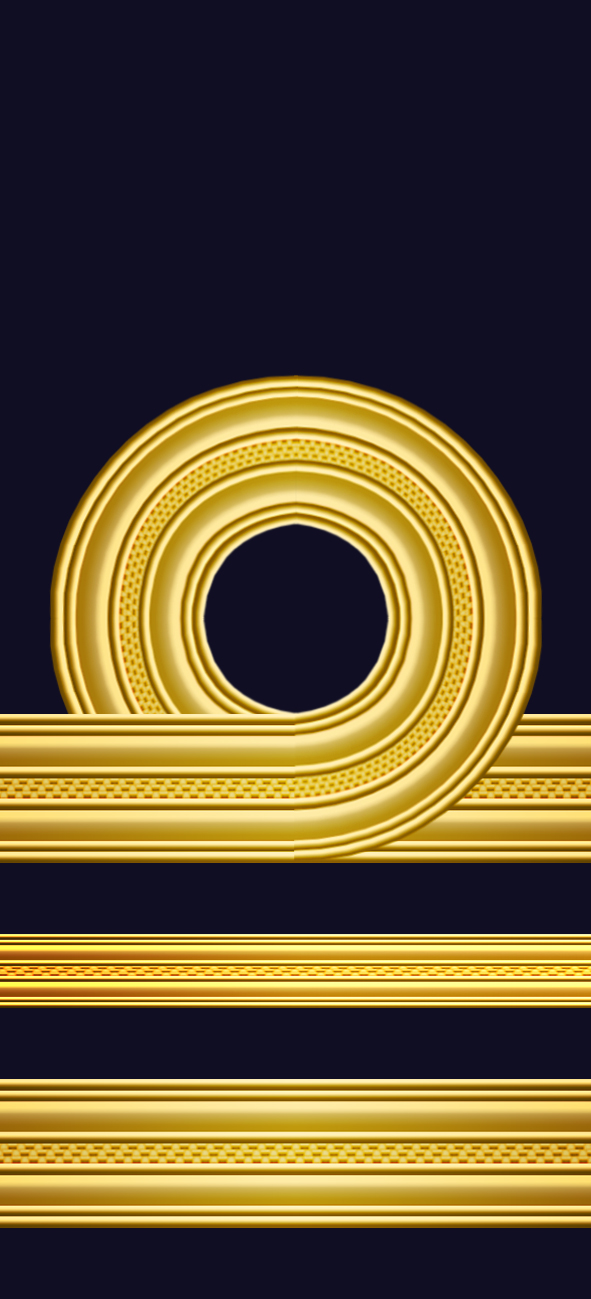
1. Embroidered shoulder mark (2003–present)

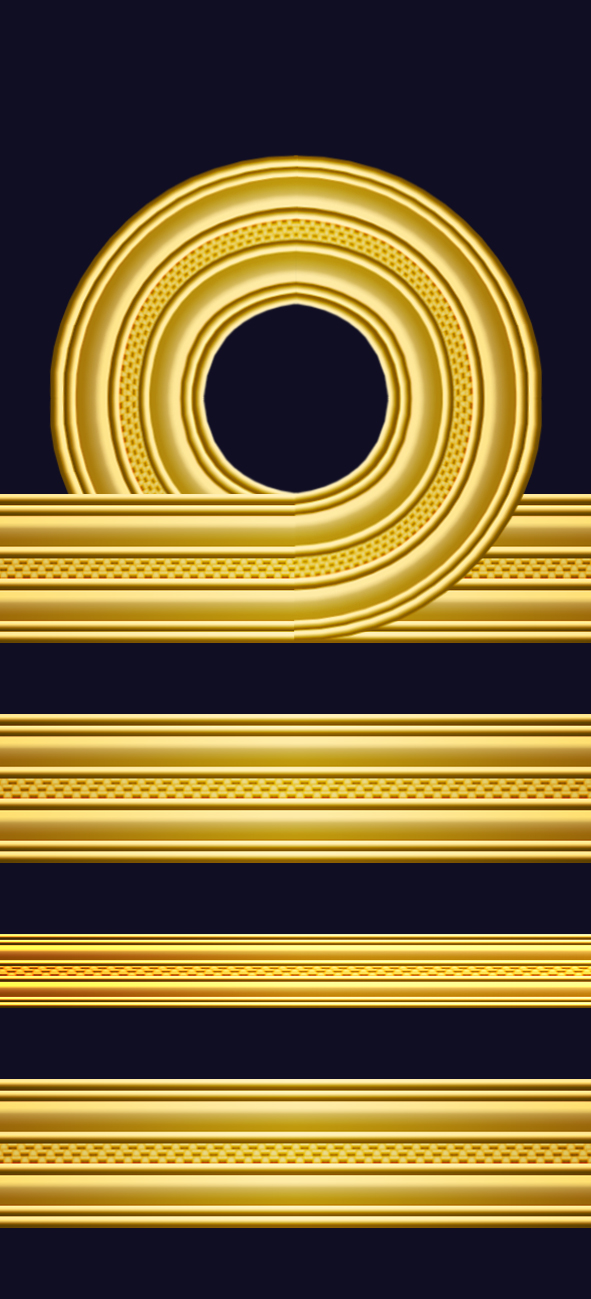
2. Embroidered shoulder mark (1987–2003)

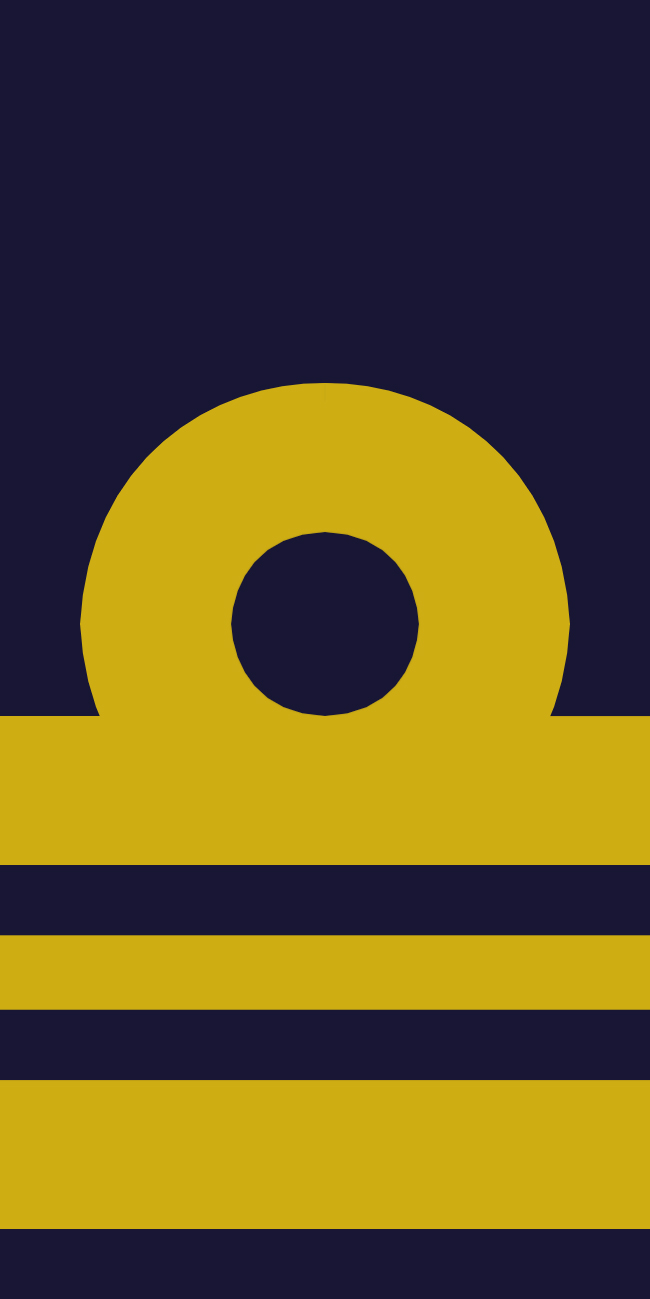
3. Woven shoulder mark (2003–present)

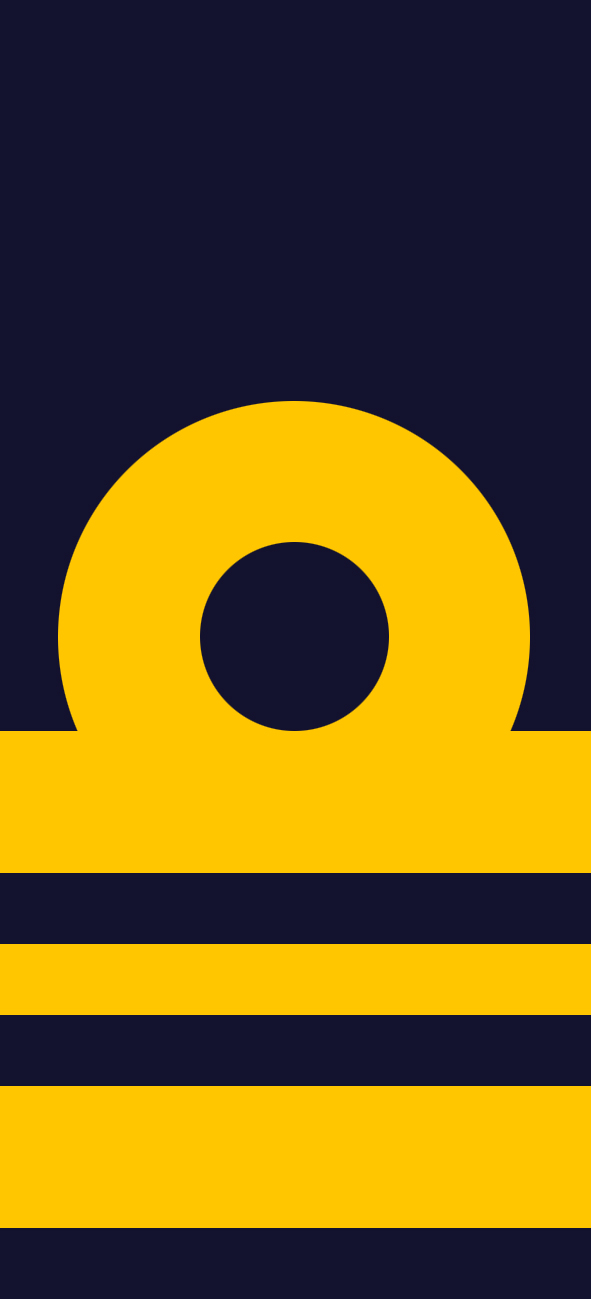
3. Woven shoulder mark (2003–present)

=== Sleeve insignia ===
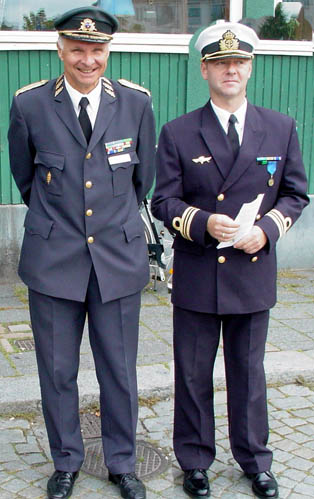
A lieutenant commander (right) wearing a suit jacket (innerkavaj m/48)

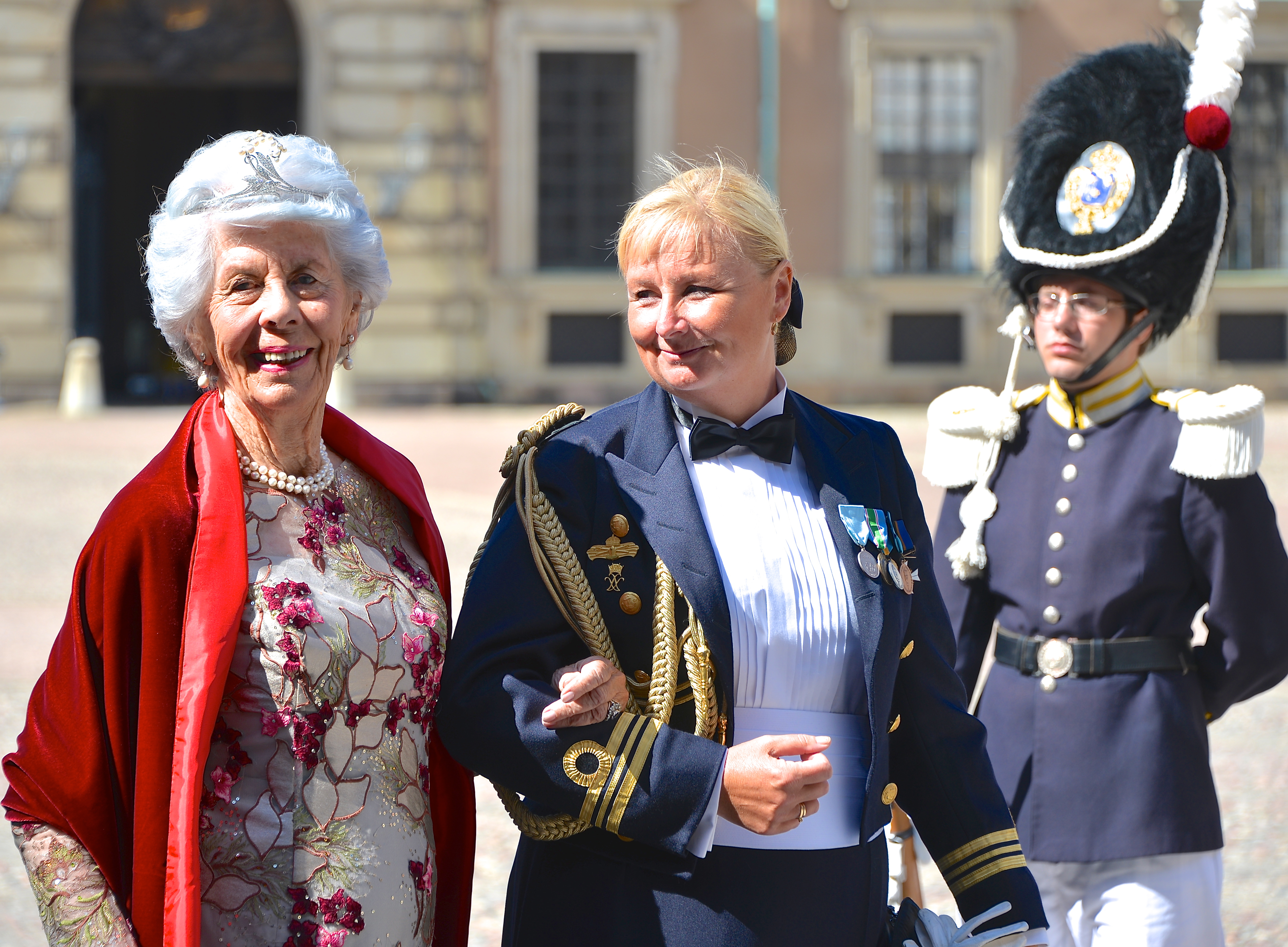
A lieutenant commander wearing a mess jacket (mässjacka m/1878)

Rank insignia is worn on both sleeves for inner suit jacket (innerkavaj m/48) and mess jacket (mässjacka m/1878).

1. On the sleeve an 12,6 mm rank insignia (gradbeteckning m/02) and galloon (galon m/02). The distance between galloons should be 6 mm. The distance from the bottom edge of the sleeve to the bottom edge of the top galloon should be 100 mm.

2. Before 2003, lieutenant commanders wore four gold galloons and a loop of gold galloon.

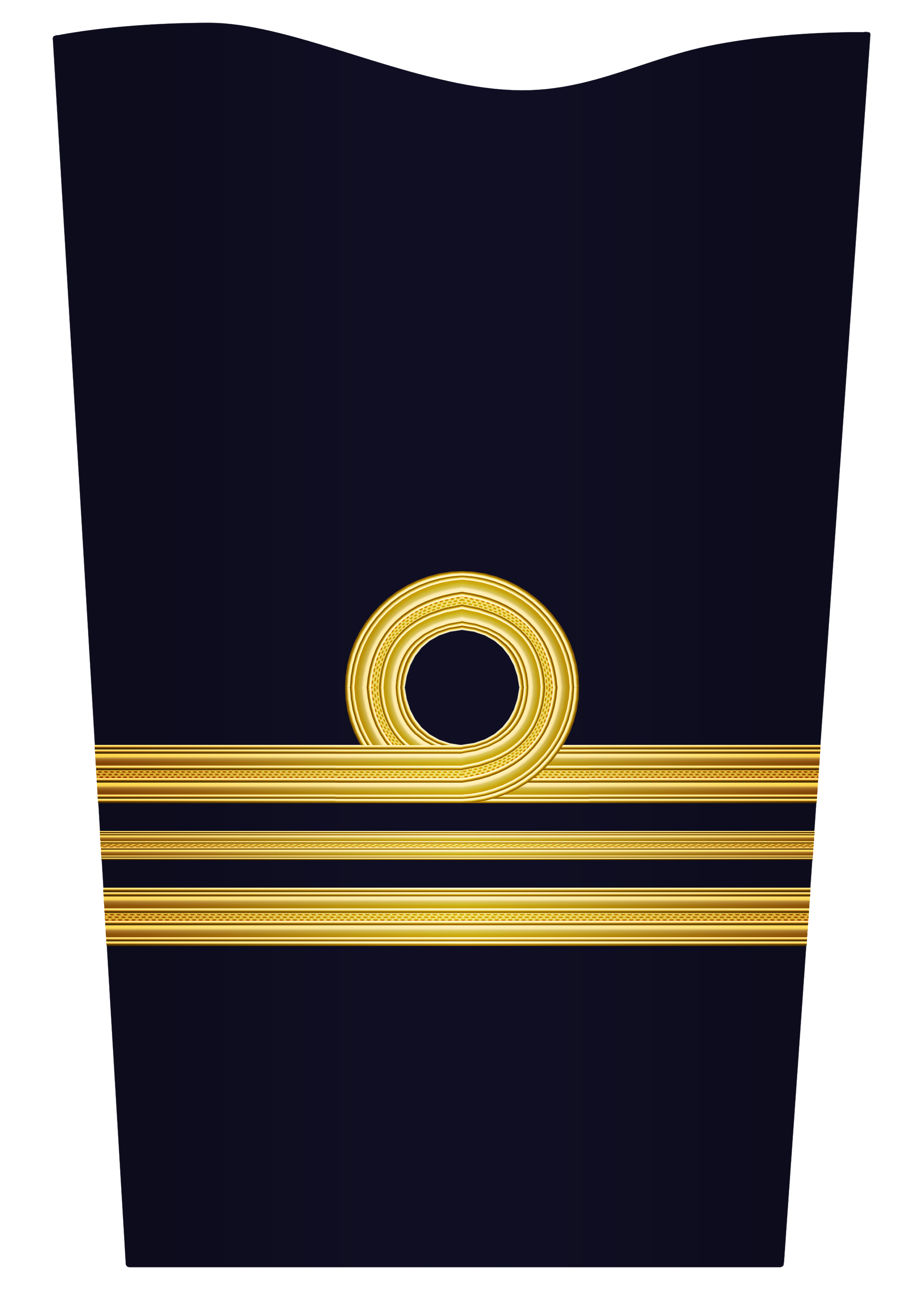
1. Sleeve insignia for a lieutenant commander (2003–present)

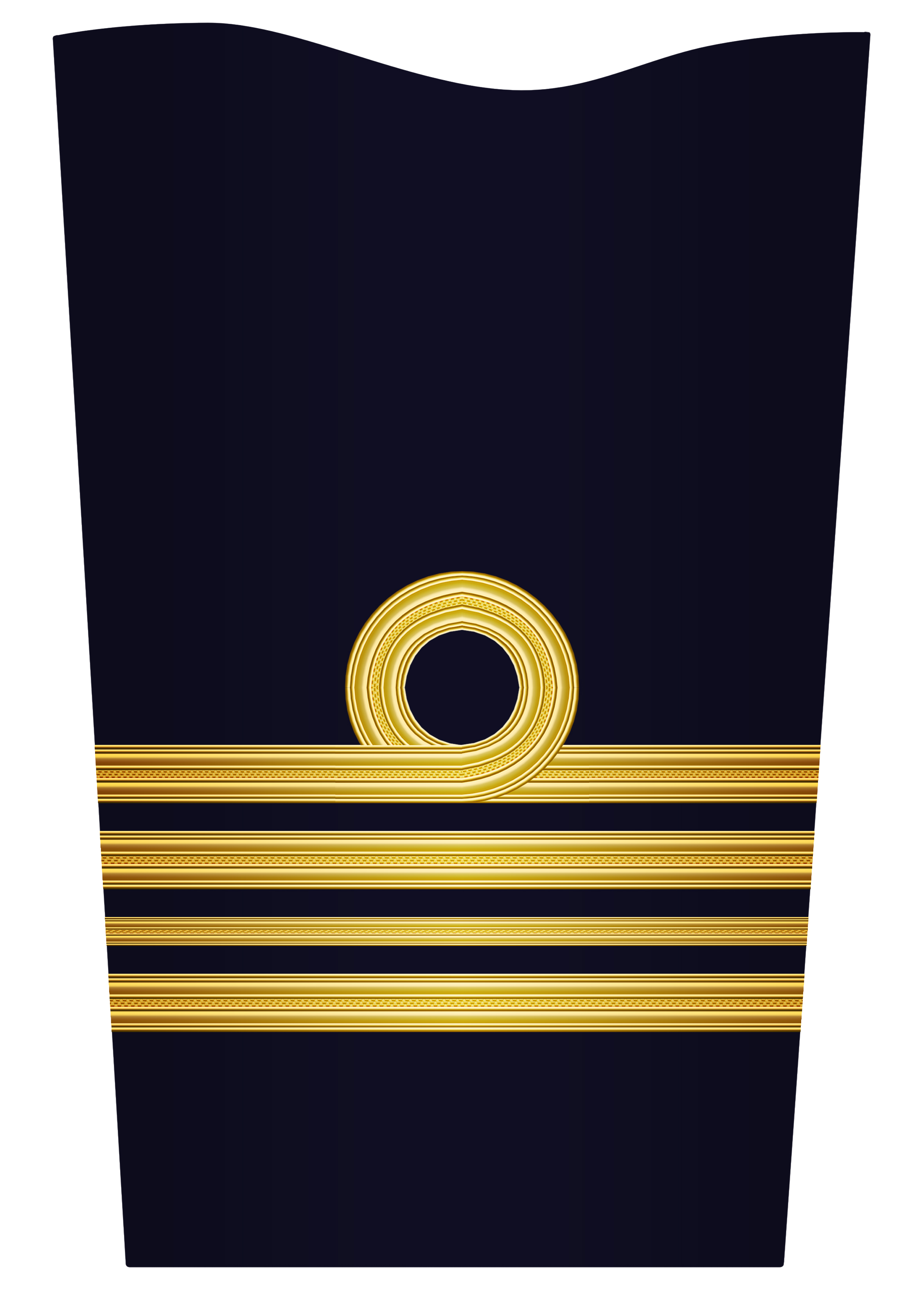
2. Sleeve insignia for a lieutenant commander (1987–2003)

=== Hats ===
==== Peaked cap ====
A lieutenant commander wears embellishments (skärmbeteckning m/02/skärmbroderi m/02) on the visor of the peaked cap (skärmmössa m/48). It also fitted with a hat badge (mössmärke m/78 off för flottan) and with a strap in form of a golden braid (mössträns m/42).

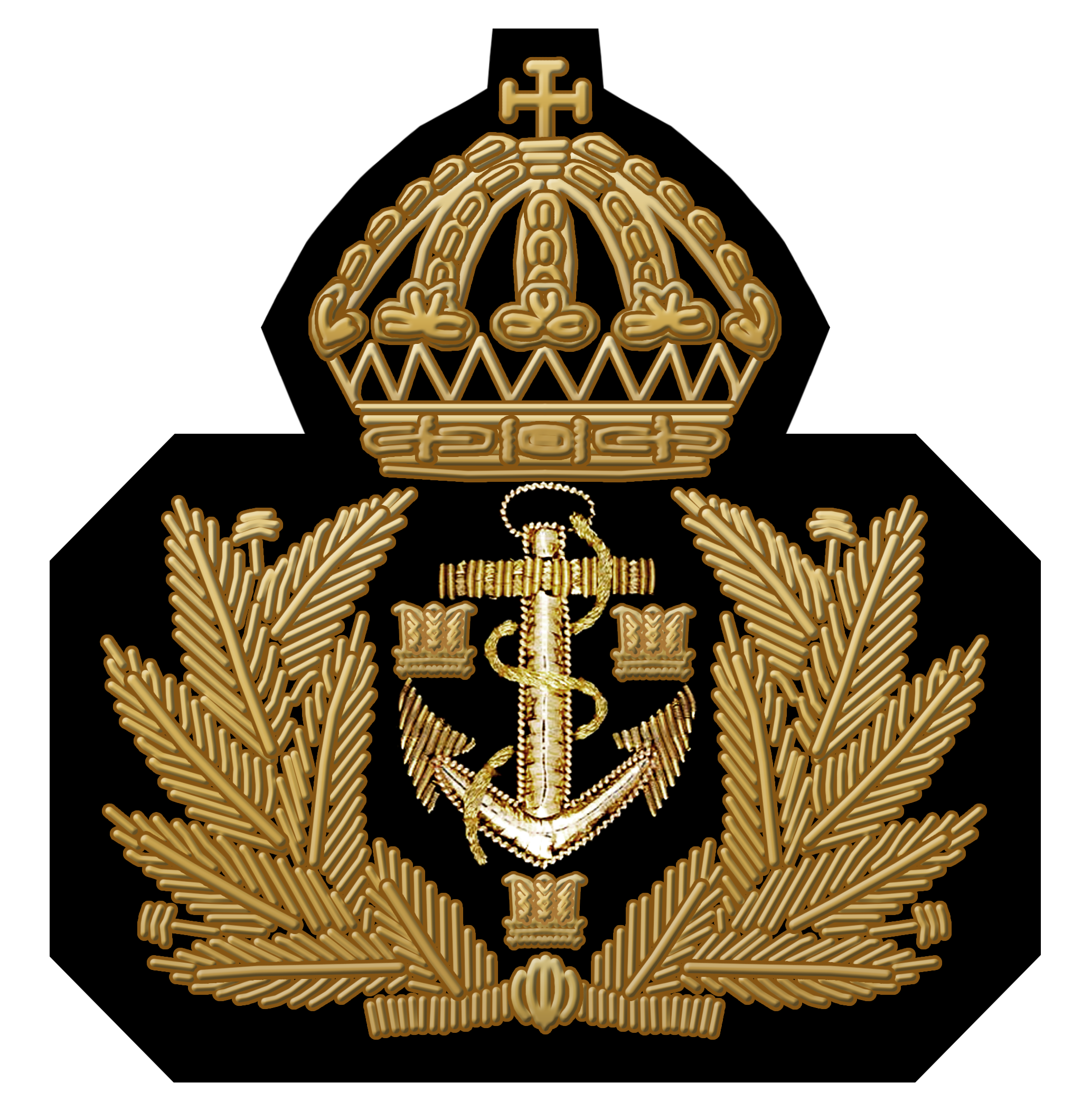
Hat badge

==== Side cap and winter hat ====
An officer wears a hat badge (mössmärke m/78 off) for the navy and another (mössmärke m/87 off) for amphibious units on the side cap (båtmössa m/48) and on the winter hat (vintermössa m/87).

=== Epaulette ===
A lieutenant commander wears epaulette's (epålett m/1878) to white tie (frack m/1878) and to coat (rock m/1878). On the epaulette, a lieutenant commander wears 4 mm fringes in two rows.

== Personal flags ==
Navy Pennant

The command flag of a lieutenant commander (and for a major, commander and lieutenant colonel), is the so-called Navy Pennant (Örlogsvimpel), which is a long swallowtailed pennant per fess blue and yellow. The Navy Pennant is carried on the Swedish Navy ships from or on which naval officer of a lower rank than captain exercises his command, or on which he travels in the service.
