= Fredrik Löwenhielm =

Swedish Army officer

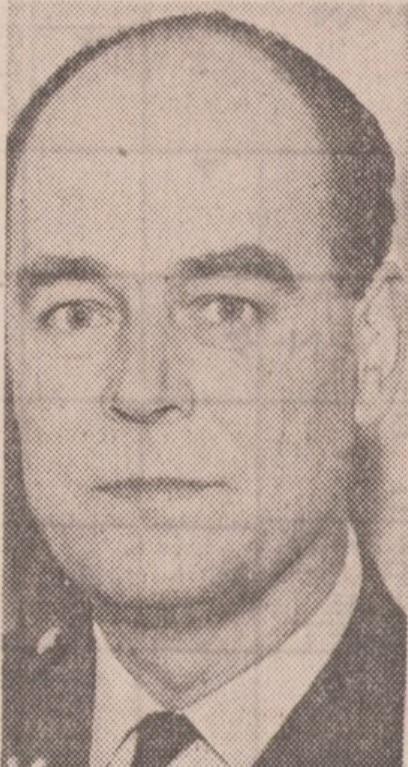
- Born: Fredrik Adolf Löwenhielm; 9 June 1916; Stockholm, Sweden
- Died: 11 May 2008 (aged 91); Stockholm, Sweden
- Burial place: Falsterbo Old Cemetery
- Military career
- Allegiance: Sweden
- Branch: Swedish Army
- Service years: 1937–1981
- Rank: Major General
- Commands: Svea Life Guards; Gotland Military Command; Chief of Home Guard
- Other work: Master of Ceremonies

Major General Fredrik Adolf Löwenhielm (9 June 1916 – 11 May 2008) was a Swedish Army officer. Löwenhielm began his military career in 1937 as a second lieutenant in Stockholm and steadily rose through the ranks, becoming a cavalry captain in 1945 and later serving in the General Staff Corps. He attended military colleges in Sweden and abroad, including in England, Norway, France, Canada, and the United States. During the 1950s and 1960s, he contributed to several Swedish defense inquiries and held key positions such as regimental commander and army inspector. From 1968 to 1971, he commanded the Gotland Military Command, and from 1971 to 1980, he was Chief of Home Guard, where he led major reforms and modernization efforts. His tenure saw upgrades in weapons, training, medical support, and increased funding.

After his military service, Löwenhielm became Master of Ceremonies and held important ceremonial roles within the Swedish royal orders. He authored a key reference on Swedish orders and medals and was active in several historical and religious societies. He remained involved in royal and cultural affairs well into the 1990s.

== Early life ==
Löwenhielm was born on 9 June 1916 in Oscar Parish, Stockholm, Sweden, into the Löwenhielm family, the son of Lieutenant Colonel Wilhelm Löwenhielm and Countess Beth Wachtmeister. He passed studentexamen at Östra Real in Stockholm in 1934.

== Career ==
=== Military career ===
Löwenhielm completed his officer training in 1937 and was commissioned as a second lieutenant in the Life Regiment of Horse in Stockholm the same year. He was promoted to lieutenant in 1939 and attended the Royal Swedish Army Staff College from 1944 to 1946. In 1945, he became a ryttmästare (cavalry captain). From 1946 to 1948, he served as an aspirant in the General Staff Corps and was promoted to captain in 1948. Between 1948 and 1951, he served in both the Military Office of the Swedish Minister of Defence and the Defence Staff. He also attended joint Army, Navy, and Air Force courses in England in 1950 and 1951.

From 1952 to 1953, Löwenhielm served as a captain in the Göta Life Guards in Enköping. He became a major and instructor at the Swedish National Defence College from 1953 to 1958, and was promoted to major in the General Staff Corps in 1954. He pursued further studies at the Norwegian Defence University College in 1955 and 1957, and at military colleges in France, Canada, and the United States in 1957. From 1958 to 1961, he served as a lieutenant colonel in the Västernorrland Regiment.

During the 1950s and 1960s, Löwenhielm contributed as secretary or expert to several government defense inquiries. These included the 1957 inquiry on civil defense command, the 1958 inquiry on military academies, and the 1958 and 1960 Defense Command Commissions. He also served as an expert to the Real Estate Board of the Swedish Armed Forces (Försvarets fastighetsnämnd) (1961–1965), participated in a 1964 review of educational needs at the Swedish National Defence College, and advised the 1964 civil defense command inquiry. He served as senior adjutant and colonel in the General Staff Corps and section head at the Defence Staff from 1961 to 1965. He was regimental commander of the Svea Life Guards from 1965 to 1966, and army inspector for the Eastern Military District from 1966 to 1968.

Löwenhielm commanded the Gotland Military Command from 1 October 1968 to 30 September 1971, and was Chief of Home Guard from 1 October 1971 to 31 December 1980. During his tenure, several reforms were introduced for both the general and operational (driftvärnet) Home Guard—such as new wartime roles and improved leadership structures. A broad modernization of Home Guard armament began, including the introduction of automatic rifles, new machine guns, grenade launchers, and modern mines. Uniforms were upgraded, and medical and field kitchen services were enhanced. The Home Guard's budget increased significantly during this period, and several large-scale exercises were conducted, including two national alerts. In 1976, the new training facility at the National Home Guard Combat School—Petrigården, named after the Home Guard's founder—was inaugurated.

=== Later career ===
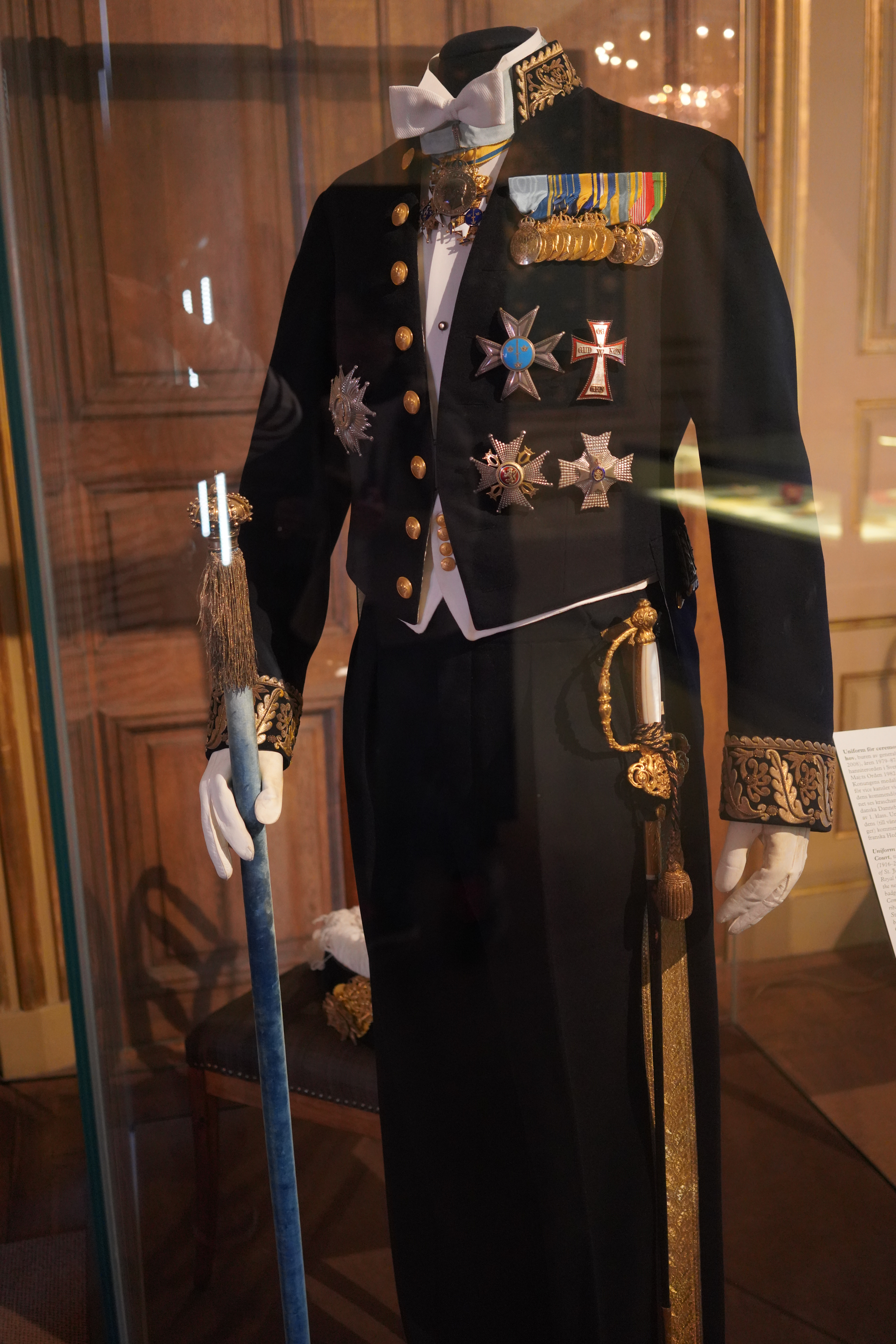
Court uniform worn by Löwenhielm

From 1979 to 1987, Löwenhielm served as Master of Ceremonies. From 1982 to 1996, he was secretary of the Order of the Seraphim (Kungl. Maj:ts Orden) and Deputy Chancellor of the Orders of His Majesty the King. In this role, he authored the reference work Svenska ordnar och medaljer (Swedish Orders and Medals). He was also vice president of the society Pro Fide et Christianismo (1982–1998), chairman of the Swedish National Committee for Genealogy and Heraldry (Svenska nationalkommittén för genealogi och heraldik) (1983–1998), chairman of the Church Assembly of the Royal Court Parish (Hovförsamlingens kyrkostämma), and a member of the Royal Consistory (1994–1998). From 1972 to 1994, he served as a commander—later honorary commander—of the Order of Saint John in Sweden.

== Personal life ==
In 1941, Löwenhielm married Baroness Barbara Beck-Friis (1919–2013), the daughter of Baron Jochum Beck-Friis, an administrative officer (kanslisekreterare), and his wife Signe (née Grenander). Children: Carl (born 1942) and Anna (born 1946).

== Death ==
Löwenhielm died on 11 May 2008 in Oscar Parish, Stockholm, Sweden. He spent his final days in care at Stockholms sjukhem. The funeral service was held at the Royal Chapel in Stockholm on 30 May 2008, followed by a reception at the Hovförvaltningens hus on Slottsbacken 2. On 8 July 2008, he was buried in his wife's family grave at Falsterbo Old Cemetery, adjacent to Falsterbo Church in Skåne County.

== Dates of rank ==
- 1937 – Second lieutenant
- 1939 – Lieutenant
- 1945 – Ryttmästare
- 1948 – Captain
- 1952 – Major
- 1958 – Lieutenant colonel
- 1961 – Colonel
- 1968 – Major general

== Awards and decorations ==
- (Sweden) H. M. The King's Medal, 12th size gold (silver-gilt) medal worn around the neck on the Order of the Seraphim ribbon (1985)
- (Sweden) Commander 1st Class of the Order of the Sword (6 June 1967)
- (Sweden) Commander of the Order of the Sword (4 June 1965)
- (Sweden) Knight of the Order of the Sword (1954)
- Knight of the Order of Saint John in Sweden
- (Sweden) Swedish Central Federation for Voluntary Military Training Medal of Merit in silver
- (Sweden) Swedish Women's Voluntary Defence Organization Royal Medal of Merit in silver
- (Sweden) Swedish Women's Auxiliary Veterinary Corps' Medal of Merit in Silver (Svenska Blå Stjärnans förtjänstmedalj i silver)
- (Sweden) Swedish Civil Protection Association Medal of Merit in silver
- (Sweden) Swedish Civil Protection Association Merit Badge
- (Sweden) Frivilliga Skytterörelsen's Bernadotte Medal
- (Sweden) Swedish Air Force Volunteers Association Medal of Merit in silver
- (Sweden) Swedish Heraldry Society Medal of Merit in gold (November 2004)
- (Sweden) RyttOlftjM

=== Foreign ===
- (Iceland) Grand Knight's Cross with Star of the Order of the Falcon (26 October 1981)
- (Denmark) Knight of the Order of the Dannebrog

== Honours ==
- Member of the Royal Swedish Academy of War Sciences (1958)

== Bibliography ==
- Löwenhielm, Fredrik; Granath, Karl-Erik; Kälde, Bengt Olof (1998). Svenska ordnar och medaljer (in Swedish) (2nd ed.). Stockholm: Atlantis. ISBN 9174864130. SELIBR 7644548.
- Löwenhielm, Fredrik; Granath, Karl-Erik; Kälde, Bengt Olof (1987). Svenska ordnar och medaljer (in Swedish). Stockholm: Atlantis. ISBN 9174864882. SELIBR 7644607.
- Löwenhielm, Fredrik (1990). Kungl. Serafimerorden i Riddarholmskyrkan (in Swedish). Stockholm: Kungl. Maj:ts orden. ISBN 9185726427. SELIBR 7752099.
- Löwenhielm, Fredrik (1981). Förstudie avseende samordning av verksamheten inom totalförsvarets lokala nivå (in Swedish). Stockholm: [s.n.] SELIBR 12223528.
- Löwenhielm, Fredrik (1956). Fem years högre försvarsstudier (in Swedish). SELIBR 12188230.

Military offices
Preceded by Sten Langéen	Commander, Svea Life Guards; 1965–1966	Succeeded by Sten Ljungqvist
Preceded by Karl Gustaf Brandberg	Commander, Gotland Military Command; 1968–1971	Succeeded by Kjell Nordström
Preceded by Karl Gustaf Brandberg	Chief of Home Guard; 1971–1980	Succeeded by Karl Eric Holm
Masonic offices
Preceded by Carl Hamilton	Commander of the Order of Saint John in Sweden; 1972–1994	Succeeded by Henry Montgomery
Court offices
Preceded by Gunnar Scheffer	Master of Ceremonies; 1979–1987	Succeeded by Kjell Nordström
