= Swedish Federation for Voluntary Defence Education and Training =

- Svenska Försvarsutbildningsförbundet
- Nickname: Försvarsutbildarna
- Formation: 1 June 1943; 83 years ago
- VAT ID no.: SE802000545301
- Location: Stockholm, Sweden
- Fields: Voluntary defence training
- Secretary General: Bo Stennabb
- Website: www.forsvarsutbildarna.se
- Formerly called: Swedish Central Federation for Voluntary Military Training

The Swedish Federation for Voluntary Defence Education and Training (Swedish: Svenska Försvarsutbildningsförbundet, commonly known as Försvarsutbildarna) is a nationwide voluntary defence organization with the aim of strengthening the Swedish Total Defence. The organization was founded in 1943 under the name of the Swedish Central Federation for Voluntary Military Training (Swedish: Centralförbundet för befälsutbildning, CFB) before changing to its current name in 2006.

== History ==
On 5 July 1912, 18 of Sweden's Landstorm associations met at a congress and made a decision to form Sveriges Landstormsföreningars riksförbund ("National Association of the Swedish Landstorm Association's"). In 1915, Landstormspojkar was formed, which became the first youth department. The aim of the youth departments' activities was, in collaboration with home, school and employers, to raise Swedish boys and young people to be good citizens with the ability to participate in the defence of the motherland and to assist in the schools' military service training.

Through the Defence Act of 1942, the landstorm organization was abolished. However, there was still a need for voluntary officer training to complement the compulsory training that was now introduced. On 1 June 1943, the King in Council determined basic statutes for the Swedish Central Federation for Voluntary Military Training (Swedish: Centralförbundet för befälsutbildning, CFB), whose main task was to conduct voluntary officer training.

In January 2006, the organization changed its name to the Swedish Federation for Voluntary Defence Education and Training (Svenska Försvarsutbildningsförbundet, FBU) to mark that the organization should keep pace with the changes that have taken place in Sweden's defence and security policy and the development of the Swedish Armed Forces. The organization now turned to everyone who was interested in supporting society's civilian crisis management. At the 2012 national assembly, a new business idea was adopted with a new focus. The activities of the organization now included the entire scale from the security of the individual to the defence of society.

== Nationwide associations ==
The organization are found all over Sweden through their regional associations and local associations as well as through their nationwide associations that gather around different skills or activities:

- Association of Interpreter Officers (Befälsföreningen Militärtolkar)
- CBRN Association (CBRN-förbundet)
- Parachute Rangers Association (Förbundet Fallskärmsjägarna)
- Fältartisterna
- Military Chaplain Association (Förbundet Militära Själavårdare)
- Försvarsutbildarna Miljö och hälsa
- Association of Home Guard Officers (Hemvärnsbefälets Riksförbund)
- Cavalry and Ranger Association (Kavalleri- och Jägarförbundet)
- Crisis Communicators (Kriskommunikatörerna, Criscom)
- Coastal Ranger Association (Förbundet Kustjägarna)
- Air Defence Association (Luftvärnsförbundet)
- Military Police Association (Militärpolisförbundet)
- PsyOp Association (Psyopsförbundet)
- Association of Swedish Reserve Officers (Förbundet Sveriges Reservofficerare, SVEROF)
- Swedish Medical Association (Svenska Sjukvårdsförbundet)

== Regional associations ==
=== Region South ===
- Försvarsutbildarna Blekinge
- Försvarsutbildarna Kalmar
- Försvarsutbildarna Kronoberg
- Försvarsutbildarna Northern Småland
- Försvarsutbildarna Skåne
- Försvarsutbildarna Östergötland

=== Region North ===
- Försvarsutbildarna Jämtland
- Försvarsutbildarna Norrbotten
- Försvarsutbildarna Västerbotten
- Försvarsutbildarna Västernorrland

=== Region Center ===
- Försvarsutbildarna Dalarna
- Försvarsutbildarna Gotland
- Försvarsutbildarna Gävleborg
- Försvarsutbildarna Stockholm and Södermanland
- Försvarsutbildarna Uppland
- Försvarsutbildarna Västmanland

=== Region West ===
- Försvarsutbildarna Bohuslän-Dal
- Försvarsutbildarna Gothenburg
- Försvarsutbildarna Halland
- Försvarsutbildarna Skaraborg
- Försvarsutbildarna Värmland
- Försvarsutbildarna Älvsborg
- Försvarsutbildarna Örebro

== Secretaries General ==
- 1924−1944: Lieutenant colonel Hugo Holmquist
- 1944−1961: Colonel Bo Skogh
- 1961−1970: Colonel Carl Yngve Dahl
- 1970−1990: Colonel Björn Orward
- 1990−2002: Colonel Anders Håkansson
- 2002−2011: Leif Tyrén
- 2011–2021: Colonel Bengt Sandström
- 2022–present: Colonel Bo Stennabb

== See also ==
- Swedish Federation for Voluntary Defence Education and Training Merit Badge
- Swedish Federation for Voluntary Defence Education and Training Medal of Merit
