= Samuel Åkerhielm =

Swedish Army officer (1887–1976)

Friherre Samuel Åkerhielm
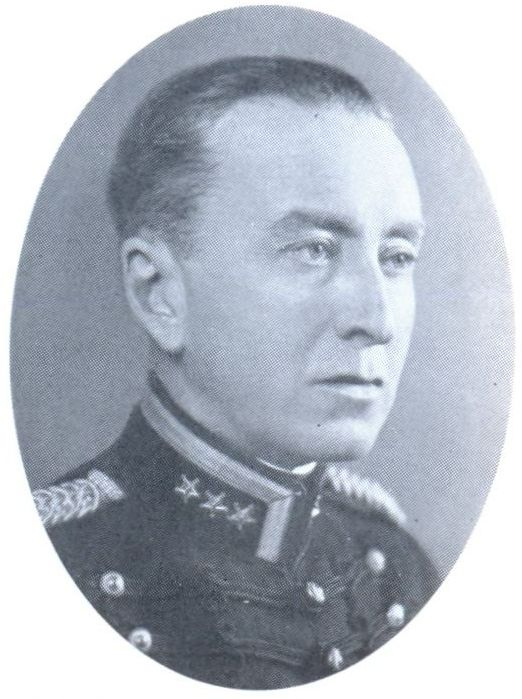
- Åkerhielm as colonel.
- Born: Samuel Lars Åkerhielm; 23 October 1887; Stockholm, Sweden
- Died: 5 February 1960 (aged 75); Lund, Sweden
- Military career
- Allegiance: Sweden
- Branch: Swedish Army
- Service years: 1908–1953
- Rank: Lieutenant General
- Commands: Norrbotten Artillery Corps; Royal Swedish Army Staff College; Svea Artillery Regiment; VII Military District; Gotland Naval District; I Military District

Lieutenant General Friherre Samuel Lars Åkerhielm af Blombacka (23 October 1887 – 15 January 1976) was a senior Swedish Army officer. Åkerhielm had a distinguished military career in Sweden. He began as an officer in 1908, serving in various roles and attending military colleges. He rose through the ranks, becoming a lieutenant colonel and later a colonel. He held key positions, including heading the Royal Swedish Army Staff College and commanding the Svea Artillery Regiment. In 1941, he briefly served as Deputy Chief of the Defence Staff. Åkerhielm was promoted to major general and became the military commander of the VII Military District and the Gotland Naval District in 1942. Despite challenges to his role, he remained in command for several years. He retired in 1953 as a lieutenant general and transitioned to the military reserve. Additionally, he played active roles in various organizations during his career.

== Early life ==
Åkerhielm was born on 23 October 1887 in Stockholm, Sweden, the son of the President of the Administrative Court of Appeal in Stockholm, Friherre Lars Åkerhielm and his wife Hulda (née Nyström). He passed mogenhetsexamen in Stockholm on 26 May 1906 and became a volunteer in the Svea Artillery Regiment (A 1) on 29 May the same year.

== Career ==
=== Military career ===
Åkerhielm was commissioned as an officer on 29 May 1908 and was assigned as underlöjtnant to the Svea Artillery Regiment on 31 December the same year. Åkerhielm attended the Artillery and Engineering College from 1910 to 1911 and graduated from en Artillery Course at the Artillery and Engineering College in 1913 and he was promoted to lieutenant on 2 August the same year. He attended the Royal Swedish Army Staff College from 1913 to 1915 and he served as an officer candidate in the General Staff from 1916 to 1919. He was appointed staff adjutant and promoted to captain in the General Staff on 19 December 1919 and to captain in the regiment on 24 November 1922.

Åkerhielm then served as a teacher of general staff service at the Royal Swedish Army Staff College from 1923 to 1927 and from 1928 to 1931. He was then appointed general staff officer in the staff of the IV Army Division on 15 October 1924 and then as captain in the regiment on 26 October 1926. Åkerhielm served as staff adjutant and captain in the General Staff from 27 June 1927 and chief adjutant and major in the General Staff from 21 December 1927. He was major and served as teacher at the Royal Swedish Army Staff College on 3 July 1930 and on 11 September 1931 he was appointed commander of the Norrbotten Artillery Corps (A 5). Åkerhielm was promoted to lieutenant colonel on 31 May 1934 and to colonel in the Swedish Army on 13 November 1936.

He then served as head of the Royal Swedish Army Staff College from 30 April 1937 and as regimental commander of the Svea Artillery Regiment from 1940. Åkerhielm was acting Chief of the Defence Staff in 1941 and acting army division commander of the II Army Division (II. arméfördelningen) also in 1941. Åkerhielm was promoted to major general and military commander of the VII Military District and the Gotland Naval District in 1942.

From Supreme Commander, General Helge Jung's diary, it appears that he had planned an action to remove Åkerhielm from the post of commander of the VII Military District, similar to those against General Olof Thörnell, Major General Nils Rosenblad, Major General Henry Kellgren, and Colonel Alf Meyerhöffer, who in his opinion were "pro-German" officers. Åkerhielm, however, remained in the post for 6 years before being appointed military commander of the I Military District. He left active service in 1953 and was promoted to lieutenant general and transferred to the military reserve.

=== Other work ===
Åkerhielm was chairman of the Gotlands skarpskytte och jägargille ("Gotland Sharpshooter and Hunter Guild") from 1946 to 1948. He was also chairman of the Högkvarterskommissionen ("Headquarters Commission") from 1946 to 1947, the Försvarets krigsutredningskommission ("Swedish Armed Forces War Investigation Commission") from 1947 to 1955. Åkerhielm was inspector of the Högre Allmänna Läroverket i Kristianstad from 1948 to 1953.

== Personal life ==
On 14 May 1913 in Stockholm, he married Frances Anna Margareta Reuterswärd (born 6 November 1891), the daughter of lieutenant colonel Carl Fredrik Casper Reuterswärd and Baroness Rosa Elisabet von Ungern-Sternberg. They had one daughter, Margareta Elisabet, born 12 February 1915 in Svea artilleriregemente Parish in Stockholm. She was married to editor Stig-Arne Öström de Boussard.

== Death ==
Åkerhielm died on 15 January 1976 in Lund and buried in Lovö Cemetery on 30 January 1976.

== Dates of rank ==
- 1908 – Underlöjtnant
- 1913 – Lieutenant
- 1920 – Captain
- 1929 – Major
- 1934 – Lieutenant colonel
- 1936 – Colonel
- 1942 – Major general
- 1953 – Lieutenant general

== Awards and decorations ==
=== Swedish ===
- (Sweden) Commander Grand Cross of the Order of the Sword (4 June 1949)
- (Sweden) Commander 1st Class of the Order of the Sword (14 November 1942)
- (Sweden) Swedish Central Federation for Voluntary Military Training Medal of Merit in silver
- (Sweden) Swedish Women's Voluntary Defence Organization Royal Medal of Merit in Silver
- (Sweden) King Gustaf V Olympic Commemorative Medal (Konung Gustaf V:s olympiska minnesmedalj) (1912)
- (Sweden) Gotland Association for Volunteer Military Training's Gold Medal (Gotlands befäls(utbildnings)förbunds guldmedalj)
- (Sweden) Gotland Sharpshooter and Hunter Guild Medal of Merit (Gotlands skarpskytte och jägargilles förtjänstmedalj)

=== Foreign ===
- Commander of the Order of the White Rose of Finland
- (Nazi Germany) 1st Class of the Order of the German Eagle
- (Netherlands) Officer of the Order of Orange-Nassau with Swords (1931)

== Honours ==
- Member of the Royal Swedish Academy of War Sciences (1938)

Military offices
Preceded by None	VII Military District; 1942–1948	Succeeded by Ivar Backlund
Preceded by Erik Braunerhielm as CO of the East Coast Naval District	Gotland Naval District; 1942–1948	Succeeded by Ivar Backlund as CO of the VII Military District
Preceded by Carl August Ehrensvärd	I Military District; 1948–1953	Succeeded by Viking Tamm
