= Gustaf Ljunggren =

Gustaf Ljunggren may refer to:

- Gustaf Ljunggren (academician)
- Gustaf Ljunggren (chemist)
- Gustaf Ljunggren (athlete)
