= Fale Burman =

Swedish Army officer (1903–1973)

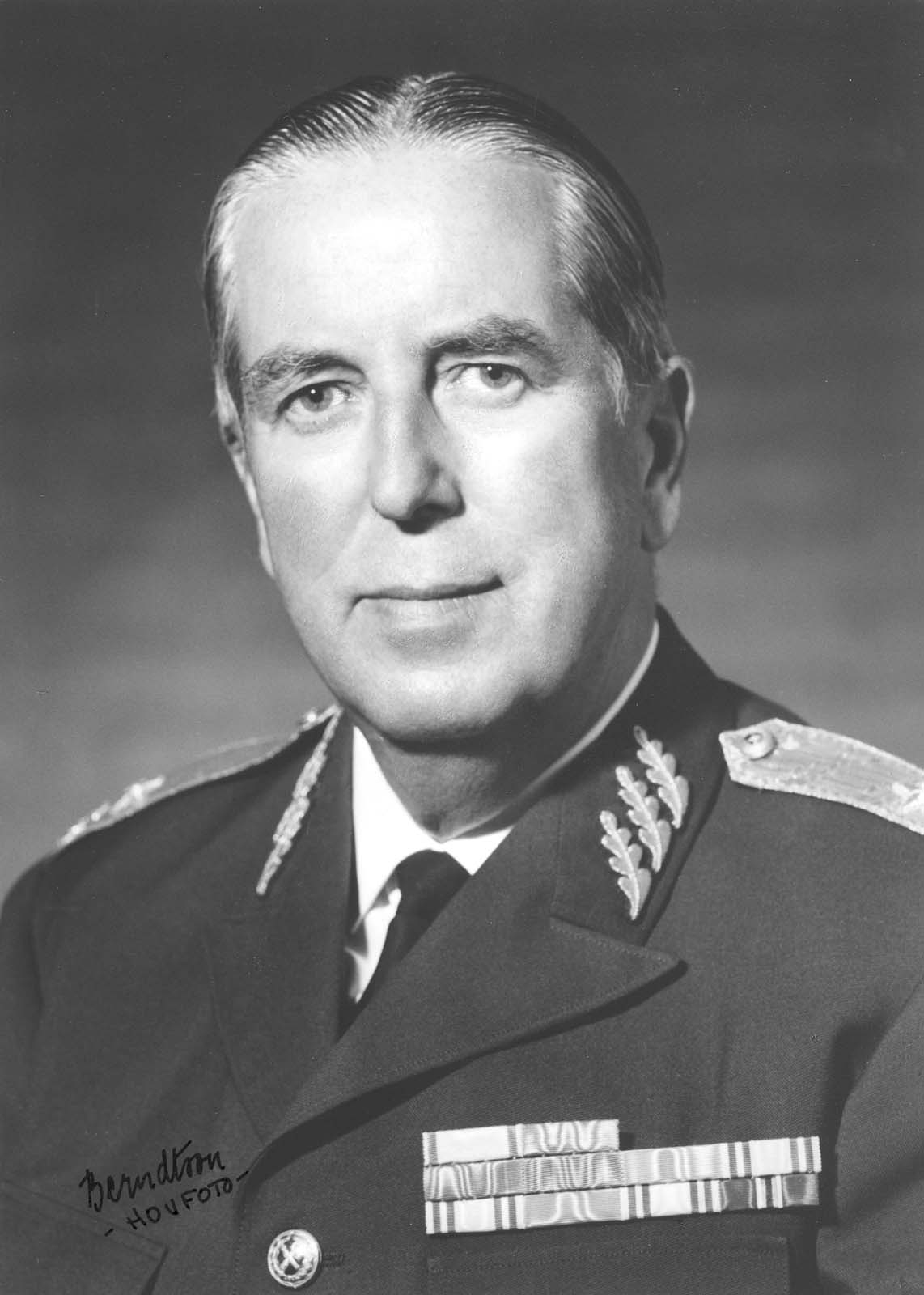
- Born: Fale Faleson Burman; 12 January 1903; Malmö, Sweden
- Died: 6 September 1973 (aged 70); Solna, Sweden
- Burial place: Solna Cemetery
- Relatives: Karl Amundson (father-in-law)
- Military career
- Allegiance: Sweden
- Branch: Swedish Army
- Service years: 1922–1968
- Rank: Lieutenant General
- Commands: Göta Life Guards; Inspector, Army Signal Troops; VII Military District; III Military District

Lieutenant General Fale Faleson Burman (12 January 1903 – 6 September 1973) was a Swedish Army officer. Burman’s military career spanned from his commissioning in 1922 to his retirement as a lieutenant general in 1968. Starting in the Scanian Hussar Regiment, he advanced through rigorous training and General Staff service, contributing to Sweden’s defense modernization in the 1930s. During World War II, he held key staff positions, including chief of staff for the 2nd Army Division and the II Military District. Post-war, he served as military attaché in Ankara, Athens, and Tehran, commanded the Göta Life Guards, and acted as Inspector of the Army Signal Troops. Promoted to major general in 1959, he became Commanding General of both the VII and III Military Districts before retiring to the reserve list. Known as a forthright debater, author of Born to be a Soldier, and leader in civilian organizations, Burman remained an influential figure well beyond his active service.

== Early life ==
Burman was born on 12 January 1903 in Malmö Garison Parish in Malmö, Sweden, the son of Fale Burman, a captain in the cavalry, and his wife Cornelia Siwers. He passed studentexamen at Nya Elementar in Stockholm in 1920.

== Career ==
Burman was commissioned as an officer in 1922 and was assigned as a second lieutenant to the Scanian Hussar Regiment in Helsingborg. He attended the Swedish Army Riding and Horse-Driving School from 1923 to 1924 and was promoted to underlöjtnant in 1924 and attended the Royal Central Gymnastics Institute from 1924 to 1926. He was promoted to lieutenant in 1927 and served from 1928 in the Scanian Cavalry Regiment (Skånska kavalleriregementet). Burman attended the General Course at the Artillery and Engineering College from 1928 to 1930 and the Higher Course there from 1930 to 1932. He was an aspirant in the General Staff from 1933 to 1935, was promoted to captain in the General Staff in 1935 and was appointed ryttmästare in the Scanian Cavalry Regiment in 1936. He was head of the Equipment Office in the Organization Department in the General Staff and thereby made efforts in various areas of equipment during the strengthening of the Swedish defence in the late 1930s, including the acquisition of tanks. In the years 1940–1941 he belonged to Jämtland Ranger Regiment and was department head at the Army Staff. In 1941, Burman was promoted to major in the General Staff Corps, whereupon he served as chief of staff of 2nd Army Division (II. arméfördelningen) from 1941 to 1942 and of the staff in the II Military District from 1942 to 1944.

Burman was promoted to lieutenant colonel in 1944 and served in the Scanian Armoured Regiment from 1944 to 1945, in Göta Armour Guards Regiment in 1946 and in Södermanland Armoured Regiment in 1946. Burman served as military attaché in Ankara from 1948 to 1950, also in Athens and Tehran from 1949 to 1950. He was promoted to colonel in the Swedish Armoured Troops in 1949 and served in the Defence Staff. In 1951 he was appointed commander of the Gotland Infantry Regiment but before he took command, he was instead appointed executive commander of Göta Life Guards - a post he came to hold from 1951 to 1955. Burman then served as Inspector of the Swedish Army Signal Troops in the Defence Staff from 1955 to 1959 when he was promoted to major general and appointed Commanding General of the VII Military District. He served in this position until 1963 when he was appointed Commanding General of the III Military District. From 1966 to 1968 Burman was at the Supreme Commander of the Swedish Armed Forces's disposal and in 1968 he retired from active service and was promoted to lieutenant general on the reserve list.

Burman wrote articles for both military journals and the daily press. In an obituary it says: "In speech and writing, he was happy to defend his views and there were often fights around him." In 1969 he published the memoir Born to be a soldier. He was an inspector at the higher general educational institution in Enköping from 1951 to 1955 and chairman of the Gotland Shooting Association (Gotlands skytteförbund) from 1960 to 1963.

== Personal life ==
In 1926, Burman married Birgit Westman (born 1905), the daughter of envoy Gustaf Westman and Ester Janse. In 1951 he married Ingrid Gudrun Murray (1905–1980), the daughter of Major General Karl Amundson (1873–1938) and Blenda Millberg (1878–1953).

He had three children: Hubert (born 1927), Madeleine (born 1930), and Jan (born 1936).

== Death ==
Burman died on 6 September 1973 in Råsunda Parish, Solna Municipality. He was interred at Solna Cemetery.

== Dates of rank ==
- 1922 – Second lieutenant
- 1924 – Underlöjtnant
- 1927 – Lieutenant
- 1935 – Ryttmästare
- 1935 – Captain
- 1941 – Major
- 1944 – Lieutenant colonel
- 1949 – Colonel
- 1959 – Major general
- 1968 – Lieutenant general

== Awards and decorations ==
- (Sweden) Commander Grand Cross of the Order of the Sword (6 June 1966)
- (Sweden) Commander 1st Class of the Order of the Sword (23 November 1955)
- (Sweden) Commander of the Order of the Sword (23 November 1953)
- (Sweden) Knight of the Order of the Sword (1942)
- (Sweden) Knight of the Order of Vasa (1945)
- (Sweden) Home Guard Medal of Merit in gold (6 June 1963)
- (Sweden) Swedish Central Federation for Voluntary Military Training Medal of Merit in silver
- (Sweden) Uppsala Association for Volunteer Military Training's medal in gold
- (Sweden) Gotland Shooting Association's medal in gold
- (Sweden) Gotland Association for Volunteer Military Training's medal in gold
- (Sweden) Army Shooting Medal (Arméns skyttemedalj)
- (Sweden) Swedish Red Cross Badge of Honor
- (Norway) Norwegian Shooting Board Badge of Honor

== Honours ==
- Member of the Royal Swedish Academy of War Sciences (1958)

== Bibliography ==
- Burman, Fale F:son (1969). Född till soldat: från fänrik till överste [Born to be a soldier: from second lieutenant to colonel] (in Swedish). Stockholm: Bonnier. SELIBR 1171086.

Military offices
Preceded by Gustaf Aschan	Göta Life Guards; 1951–1955	Succeeded by Åke Wikland
Preceded by Hilding Kring	Inspector of the Swedish Army Signal Troops; 1955–1959	Succeeded by Gunnar af Klintberg
Preceded by Regner Leuhusen	Commanding General, VII Military District; 1959–1963	Succeeded by Karl Gustaf Brandberg
Preceded by Richard Åkerman	Commanding General, III Military District; 1963–1966	Succeeded by Oscar Krokstedt
