= Gustaf Ljunggren (chemist) =

Swedish chemist (1894–1966)

- Born: Gustaf Axel C:son Ljunggren; 27 October 1894; Trelleborg, Sweden
- Died: 12 August 1966 (aged 71); Djursholm, Sweden
- Education: Lunds privata elementarskola
- Alma mater: Lund University
- Spouse: Ruth Victoria Malm (m. 1929)
- Children: 2
- Scientific career
- Fields: General chemistry Chemical warfare
- Institutions: Swedish National Defence Research Institute

Gustaf Axel C:son Ljunggren (27 October 1894 – 12 August 1966) was a Swedish chemist. Ljunggren served as an assistant at Lund University's chemical department from 1918 to 1920. Subsequently, he taught general chemistry in the medical faculty at the university until 1928, earning a Licentiate of Philosophy degree in 1921. He chaired the Chemical Society of Lund from 1922 to 1926 and attained a Doctor of Philosophy degree in 1925, also becoming a lieutenant in the Swedish Coastal Artillery's reserve. Later, he held various roles, including being a docent in chemistry, a professor at the Swedish Armed Forces Chemical Institute, and the head of the Department of Chemistry at the Swedish National Defence Research Institute from 1945 to 1961. Additionally, he contributed to defense-related committees and served as a chemistry teacher at military colleges.

== Early life ==
Ljunggren was born on 27 October 1894 in Trelleborg, Sweden, the son of M.D. Carl-August Ljunggren and his wife Elise Key. His paternal grandfather was the literary historian and member of the Swedish Academy Gustaf Ljunggren (1823–1905); his uncle was the chief librarian Evald Ljunggren (1865–1935); his brother was the physician Einar Ljunggren (1896–1986).

He received a Bachelor of Arts degree from Lund University in 1914.

== Career ==
Ljunggren worked as an assistant at the chemical department at Lund University from 1918 to 1920. Ljunggren was a teacher of general chemistry within the medical faculty at Lund University from 1920 to 1928 and he received a Licentiate of Philosophy degree in 1921. He was chairman of the Chemical Society of Lund (Kemiska föreningen i Lund) from 1922 to 1926 and in 1925 he received a Doctor of Philosophy degree and became a lieutenant in the Swedish Coastal Artillery's reserve.

In 1925, Ljunggren worked as a docent in chemistry and from 1937 he was a professor at the Swedish Armed Forces Chemical Institute (Försvarsväsendets kemiska anstalt, FKA) (from 1945 called the Swedish National Defence Research Institute). He was chemistry teacher at the Artillery and Engineering College from 1942 and he was a member of the Research Council of the Swedish Armed Forces (Försvarets forskningsnämnd) during 1943. Ljunggren was head of the Department of Chemistry (FOA 1) at the Swedish National Defence Research Institute from 1945 from 1961 and he became a member of the Air Raid Shelter Investigation of 1948 (1948 års skyddsrumsutredning) and of the Defense Medical Board (Försvarsmedicinska nämnden) in 1947. He was chemistry teacher at the Royal Swedish Naval Staff College and the Royal Swedish Army Staff College from 1952.

Ljunggren was also a member of the Swedish Medical Society, the Swedish Chemical Society (Kemistsamfundet), the American Chemical Society, the Rotary International, and was an honorary member of Lund Academic Golf Club (Lunds akademiska golfklubb). He also wrote scientific papers on biochemistry and organic chemistry as well as investigations and writings on various military-technical research problems.

== Personal life ==
On 24 August 1929 in Ekeby, Malm, he married Ruth Victoria Malm (born 25 July 1901), the daughter of Carl Wilhelm Malm and Amelie Cecilia Nilsson. He was the father of Margareta (born 1930) and Jan-Gustaf (born 1933).

== Awards and decorations ==
=== Swedish ===
- (Sweden) Commander 1st Class of the Order of the Polar Star
- (Sweden) Swedish Civil Protection Association Medal of Merit in gold
- (Sweden) National Air Protection Federation Medal of Merit in gold
- (Sweden) National Air Protection Federation Merit Badge in gold

=== Foreign ===
- (Denmark) Commander of the Order of the Dannebrog

== Honours ==
- Member of the Royal Swedish Academy of War Sciences (1946)
- Member of the Royal Swedish Academy of Engineering Sciences (1955)
- Honorary Doctor of Medicine, Lund University (1958)
- Corresponding member of the Royal Swedish Society of Naval Sciences (1959)
- Honorary member of the Royal Swedish Academy of Engineering Sciences (1959)
