= Gotland Naval District =

- Gotlands marindistrikt
- Active: 1931–1956
- Country: Sweden
- Allegiance: Swedish Armed Forces
- Branch: Swedish Navy
- Type: Naval district
- Garrison/HQ: Visby

Gotland Naval District (Swedish: Gotlands marindistrikt, MDG) was a Swedish Navy unit in the Swedish Armed Forces which existed in various forms from 1931 to 1956 when the unit was amalgamated with the East Coast Naval District. The unit was located in Visby, Gotland.

== Commanding officers ==
Through the Defence Act of 1942, the military commander of Gotland also became commander of Gotland Naval District. Commanding officers of the naval district were:

- 1933–1937: Charles de Champs (as commanding officer of the East Coast Navy District)
- 1 October 1936 – 1937: Claës Lindsström (acting)
- 1937–1938: Göran Wahlström
- 1938–1942: Erik Braunerhielm
- 1942–1948: Samuel Åkerhielm (as commanding officer of the VII Military District)
