= Swedish Federation for Voluntary Defence Education and Training Merit Badge =

- Type: Merit badge
- Awarded for: Meritorious contributions within the Swedish Federation for Voluntary Defence Education's area of activity
- Country: Sweden
- Presented by: Swedish Federation for Voluntary Defence Education and Training
- Eligibility: Swedish and foreign personnel
- Status: Currently awarded
- Established: 8 May 1953
- Ribbon bar

The Swedish Federation for Voluntary Defence Education and Training Merit Badge (Swedish: Försvarsutbildarnas förtjänsttecken, FöutbGFt) is an award presented by the Swedish Federation for Voluntary Defence Education and Training and its predecessors since 1953. It is awarded for meritorious contributions to the Federation's work and mission.

== History ==
The badge, originally called the Swedish Central Federation for Voluntary Military Training Merit Badge (Swedish: Centralförbundet för befälsutbildnings förtjänsttecken, CFBGFt), was established on 8 May 1953. In 2006, the award was renamed to the Swedish Federation for Voluntary Defence Education and Training Merit Badge (Swedish: Försvarsutbildarnas förtjänsttecken, FöutbGFt), following the renaming of the Swedish Central Federation for Voluntary Military Training to the Swedish Federation for Voluntary Defence Education and Training.

== Appearance ==
=== Badge ===
The badge consists of a 36 mm high and 31 mm wide openwork badge corresponding to the 8th size. The obverse consists of an oval stylized wreath with the Swedish Federation for Voluntary Defence Education and Training's heraldic arms (azure, a cross on a chief azure fesswise three open crowns or) resting on two swords crossed over the wreath. The reverse is smooth.

=== Ribbon ===
The ribbon is 35 mm wide and made of quilted silk. It has a blue moiré pattern with a 3 mm wide yellow stripe in the middle.

== Criteria ==
The badge is awarded to Swedish or foreign citizens in recognition of meritorious contributions within the Swedish Federation for Voluntary Defence Education and Training's area of activity for, as a rule, 5 years. As a rule, the person in question should have previously been awarded their own federation's silver medal (equivalent) and the badge is usually awarded no earlier than 3 years thereafter. A maximum of 60 badges should be awarded per financial year.

== See also ==
- Swedish Federation for Voluntary Defence Education and Training Medal of Merit
