= Karl Gustaf Brandberg =

Swedish Army officer

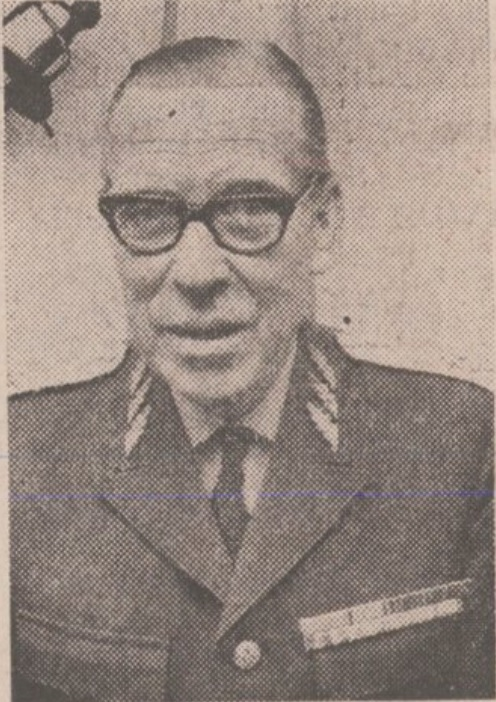
- Born: Karl Gustaf Brandberg; 13 September 1905; Tomelilla, Sweden
- Died: 19 September 1997 (aged 92); Solna, Sweden
- Military career
- Allegiance: Sweden
- Branch: Swedish Army
- Service years: 1931–1971
- Rank: Lieutenant General
- Commands: Norrbotten Regiment; VI Military District; VII Military District; Gotland Military Command; Chief of Home Guard

Lieutenant General Karl Gustaf Brandberg (13 September 1905 – 19 September 1997) was a senior Swedish Army officer. He served as Commanding General of the VII Military District (1963–1966) and Gotland Military Command (1966–1968) and as Chief of Home Guard (1968–1971).

== Early life ==
Brandberg was born on 13 September 1905 in Tryde Parish, Tomelilla Municipality, Sweden, the son of Sven Brandberg, an engineer, and Emma (née Andrén). He became a volunteer in Svea Life Guards at the age of 17 and thus began an unusual career "the long way" from non-commissioned officer to lieutenant general. He attended the Swedish Army Non-Commissioned Officer School and at the same time studied for studentexamen, which he passed in 1929.

== Career ==
Brandberg attended the Military Academy Karlberg and graduated in 1931. He was commissioned as an officer the same year and was assigned to South Scania Infantry Regiment as a second lieutenant. Brandberg was promoted to lieutenant in 1935 and to captain in 1941. From 1938 to 1940, he studied at Royal Swedish Army Staff College. He served from 1943 to 1945 at the Recruiting and Replacement Office (Centrala värnpliktsbyrån) in the Army Staff and was then the first teacher in tactics at the Artillery and Engineering College from 1945 to 1949.

In 1949 he was promoted to major and served as chief of staff in Home Guard from 1949 to 1952, after which he served in Northern Scanian Infantry Regiment from 1952 to 1955 and became lieutenant colonel in 1954. Brandberg studied at the Swedish National Defence College in 1955. In 1955 he was promoted to colonel, after which he was head of the Section for Organization and Equipment in the Army Staff from 1955 to 1958. Brandberg was regimental commander of Norrbotten Regiment from 1958 to 1961 and served as deputy commander of the VI Military District from 1961 to 1963 as well as acting commander of the VI Military District in 1963. He was promoted to major general in 1963 and was Commanding General of the VII Military District from 1 October 1963 to 30 September 1966 and Commanding General of the Gotland Military Command from 1 October 1966 to 30 September 1968. Brandberg was then the Chief of Home Guard from 1 October 1968 to 30 September 1971. Brandberg retired from active service in 1971 and was promoted to lieutenant general.

Brandberg was a member of the Gruppchefsutredningen from 1949 to 1952 and the Total Defence Personnel Inquiry (Totalförsvarets personalutredning) from 1955 to 1961. From 1971 to 1980, he served as deputy chairman of the Swedish Civil Defence League (Sveriges civilförsvarsförbund).

== Personal life ==
In 1938, Brandberg married Carin Högman (1908–1999), the daughter of Carl Högman, a vicar, and Frida Lundholm. They had three children: Karl Magnus (1940–1988), Christina (born 1943) and Anders (born 1948).

== Death ==
Brandberg died on 19 September 1997 in Solna Municipality. He interred on 31 October 1997 at Nacka Northern Cemetery in Nacka, Stockholm County.

== Dates of rank ==
- 1931 – Second lieutenant
- 1935 – Lieutenant
- 1941 – Captain
- 1949 – Major
- 1954 – Lieutenant colonel
- 1955 – Colonel
- 1963 – Major general
- 1971 – Lieutenant general

== Awards and decorations ==
- (Sweden) King Gustaf V's Jubilee Commemorative Medal (21 May 1948)
- (Sweden) Commander Grand Cross of the Order of the Sword (6 June 1970)
- (Sweden) Commander 1st Class of the Order of the Sword (6 June 1962)
- (Sweden) Swedish Red Cross Medal of Merit, 5th size (31 January 1972)

== Honours ==
- Member of the Royal Swedish Academy of War Sciences (1957)

Military offices
Preceded by Nils Björk	Acting Commander, VI Military District; 1963–1963	Succeeded by Arne Mohlin
Preceded by Fale Burman	Commander, VII Military District/Gotland Military Command; 1963–1968	Succeeded by Fredrik Löwenhielm
Preceded by Per Kellin	Chief of Home Guard; 1968–1971	Succeeded by Fredrik Löwenhielm
