= Swedish Landstorm =

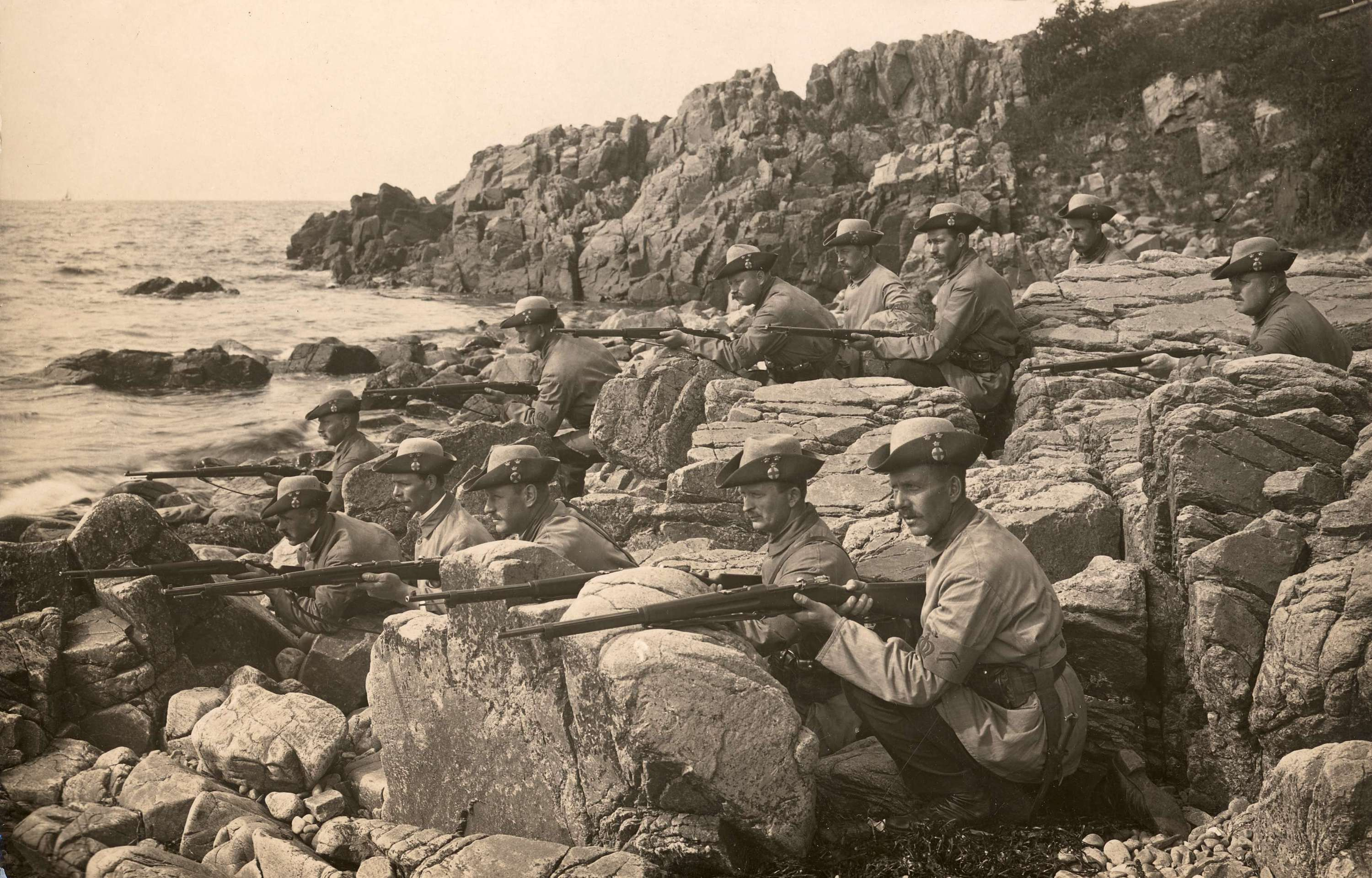
Soldiers of the Swedish Landstorm defending the Swedish coast, 1914–1915.

The Swedish Landstorm (Swedish: Svenska landstormen) was a form of militia and territorial defence force, a so-called Landstorm (roughly "land assault", lit. 'land-storm'), created in Sweden in 1885. It consisted of all conscripts who had completed their service, generally men between 33 and 40 years of age, as well as a smaller number immediately transferred there. The landstorm was intended "for the defence of the home town" within "own or nearest neighboring enlistment districts." The landstorm was first raised in time of war, in the parts of the country most threatened by the enemy, and organized according to existing conditions and provided with commanders based on advice and quarters. The landstorm was abolished in 1942.

== History ==
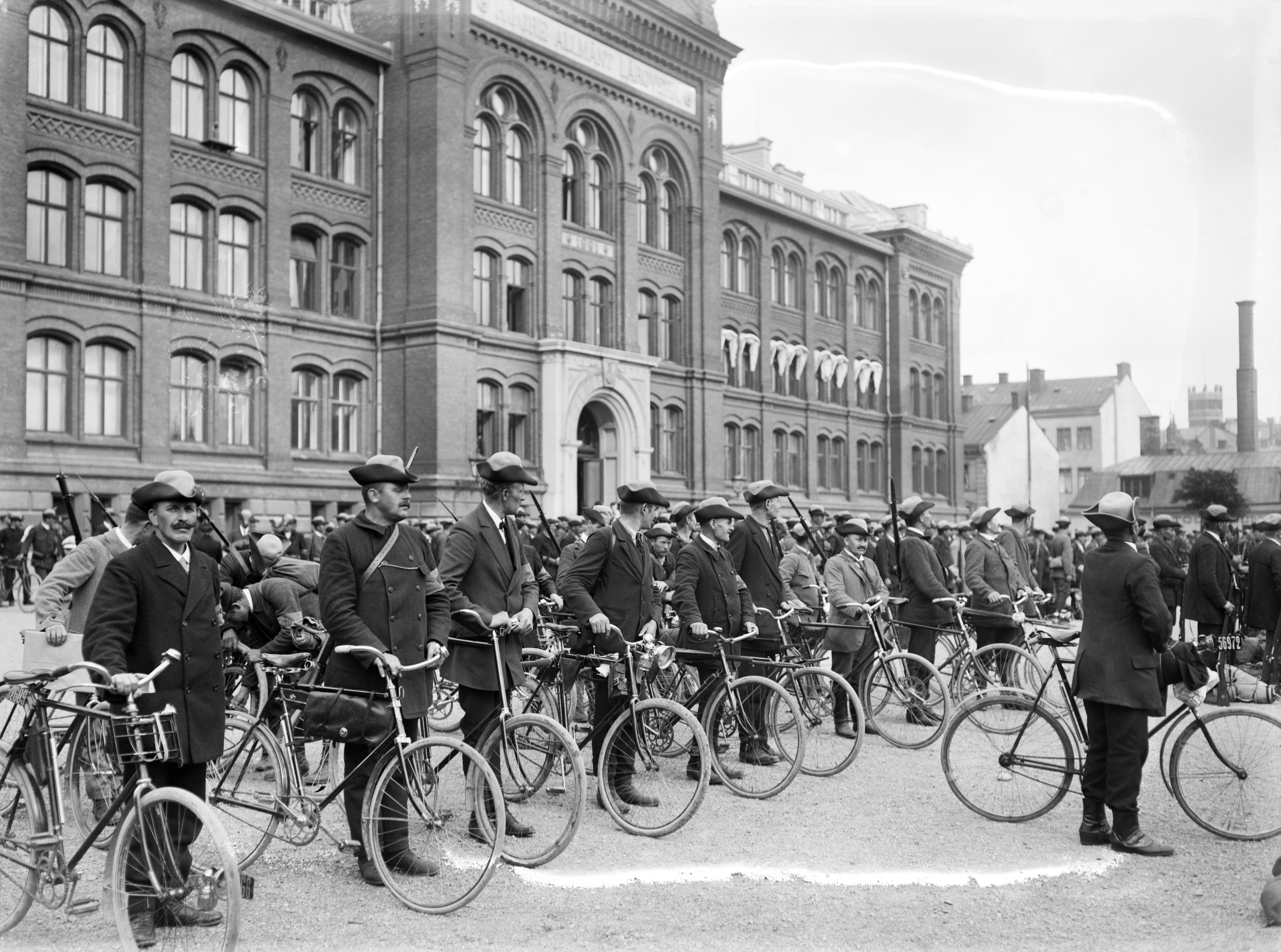
Men of the landstorm at Södra Latin in Stockholm in 1914.

In Sweden, since ancient times, every man fit for military service has been used to take up arms and participate in the defence of the kingdom when the enemy threatened or ravaged the country, upon the call of the King. The 19th century's efforts to rearrange the Swedish military order based on conscription led to the need for a fixed landstorm organization. However, it wasn't until 9 May 1885, that the Riksdag passed a conscription law to organize the landstorm. The six oldest classes of conscripts (ages 27-32) came to form the landstorm. Through the 1892 Army Order, the landstorm expanded to include the eight oldest classes, and the landstorm age range was raised to 33-40 years of age.

The landstorm was subordinate to the enlistment district commanders, and each enlistment district was usually divided into six landstorm districts, each under an officer in the reserve (in the absence of another person) assisted by a non-commissioned officer in the reserve as a manager of the landstorm storehouses available there. Voluntary exercises with the landstorm command were organized to the extent of available funds. The landstorm was assembled first in the event of war, and then in the parts of the country most threatened by the enemy. It was organized according to existing conditions and provided with commanders based on advice and quarters. The commanders of the landstorm units were mainly recruited on a voluntary basis.

According to the Defence Act of 1914, the landstorm included men aged 35-42, and conscripts belonging to the landstorm were subjected to mandatory training of five days during peacetime. However, such training took place only a short time after the adoption of the defence act. Under the Defence Act of 1925, the landstorm continued to be formed by the eight oldest classes (35-42 years of age), but no peacetime training occurred. The King could, after a decision was made to call up the first levy of conscripts and when the defence or security of the realm required it, call up the landstorm for the defence of their local area. However, special departments for protection of mobilization could be called upon before that, but they could not be kept together for longer than a maximum of 15 days. The landstorm was not allowed outside its own or neighboring enlistment district.

In accordance with the Defence Act of 1936, the landstorm was extended to include the 11 oldest classes (35-45 years of age). Peacetime training now consisted of a landstorm rehearsal exercise of five days for the majority of conscripts and, immediately before this, a landstorm command exercise of seven days for trained commanders and others. The previously applicable regulations, stating that the landstorm could not be taken outside its own or neighboring enlistment district, were repealed. The landstorm received increased tasks, including serving in territorial air defence and providing air surveillance. Additionally, the landstorm would make up the infantry of the coastal fortifications, and some engineering and service units would be organized.

According to the Defence Reform of 1901 and continuing until the Defence Act of 1942, the Swedish mainland was divided into landstorm districts to account for and organize the landstorm. Each landstorm district had a landstorm district commander, and for those landstorm districts where storehouses were established, there was also a landstorm förvaltare (Note: In a military context, förvaltare is translated as: garrison sergeant major, staff sergeant major 1st class, conductor, (US) chief warrant officer; (in the air force, Br) warrant officer, (US) chief warrant officer.). With the implementation of the Conscription Act of 1941, the division of conscripts into beväringen and the landstorm was abolished.

== Uniform ==
The landstorm troops originally did not wear uniforms but instead wore civilian clothes. Many of them wore a triangular hat (Hatt m/1910) reminiscent of the hats worn by the Caroleans. To be recognized as a belligerent force, they were given a visible distinguishing mark within rifle range, which couldn't be easily removed. In Sweden, this was called the landstormsmärke ("landstorm badge") if no uniform was available. The landstorm badge, affixed to the front of the cap (model 1905), consisted of an enameled circular metal plate (3.3 cm) with a blue field and a yellow Greek cross on it.

In the 1914 infantry instructions, it was specified that the landstorm badge should be worn securely fastened and visible from a distance, along with a landstorm armband. At the outbreak of World War I, the landstorm troops were armed with Remington M1867 rifles.

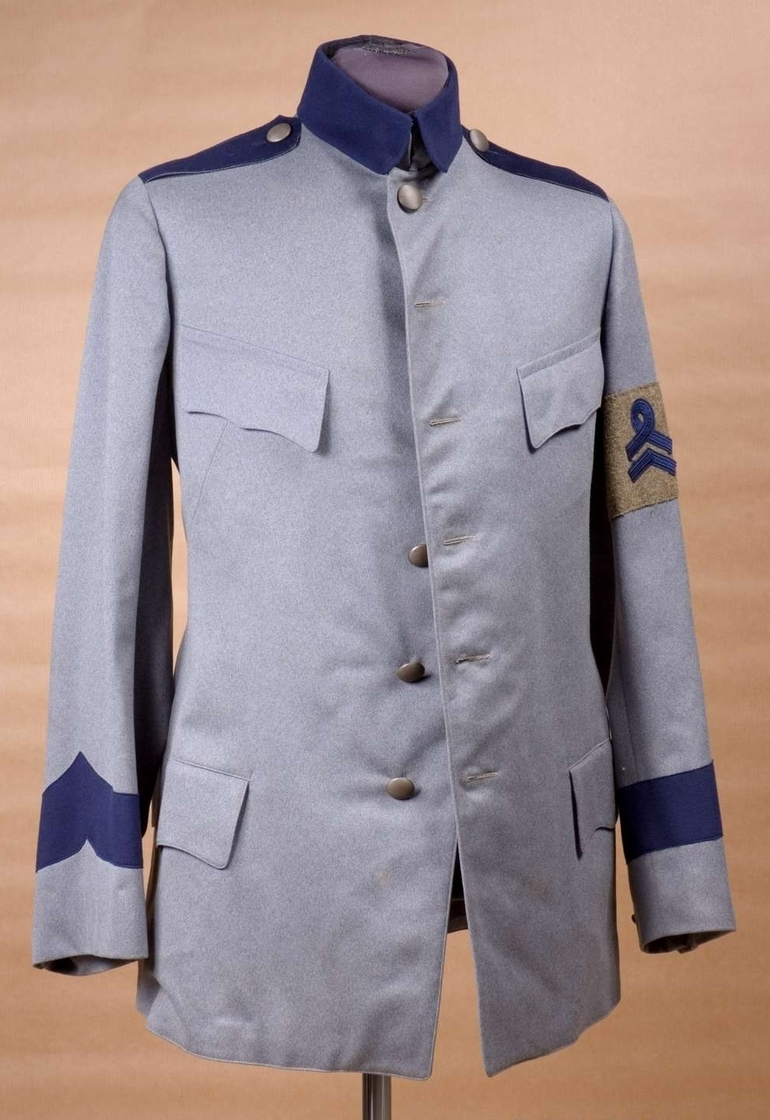
Tunic (Vapenrock m/11) with armband

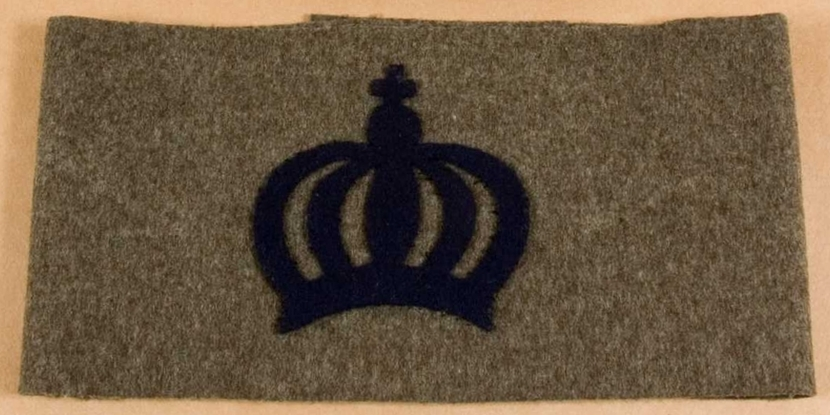
Private

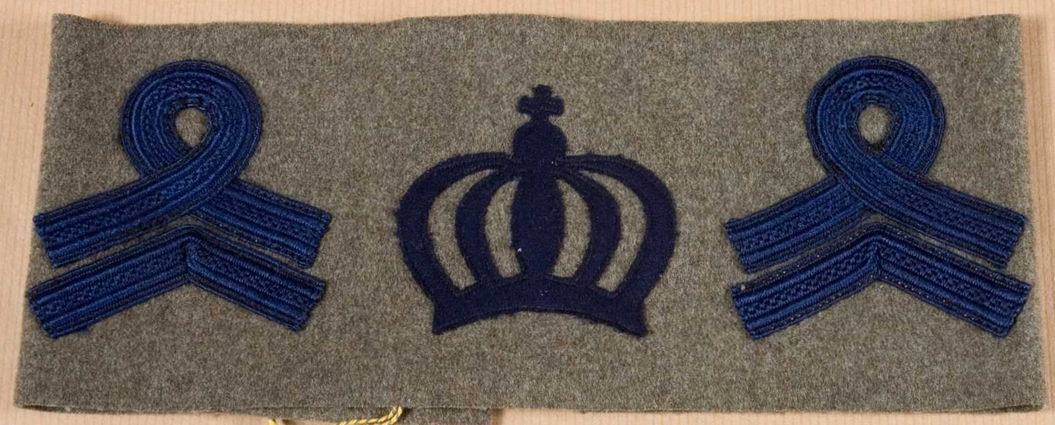
Company commander

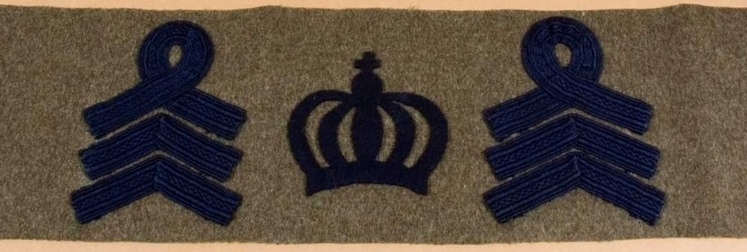
Battalion commander

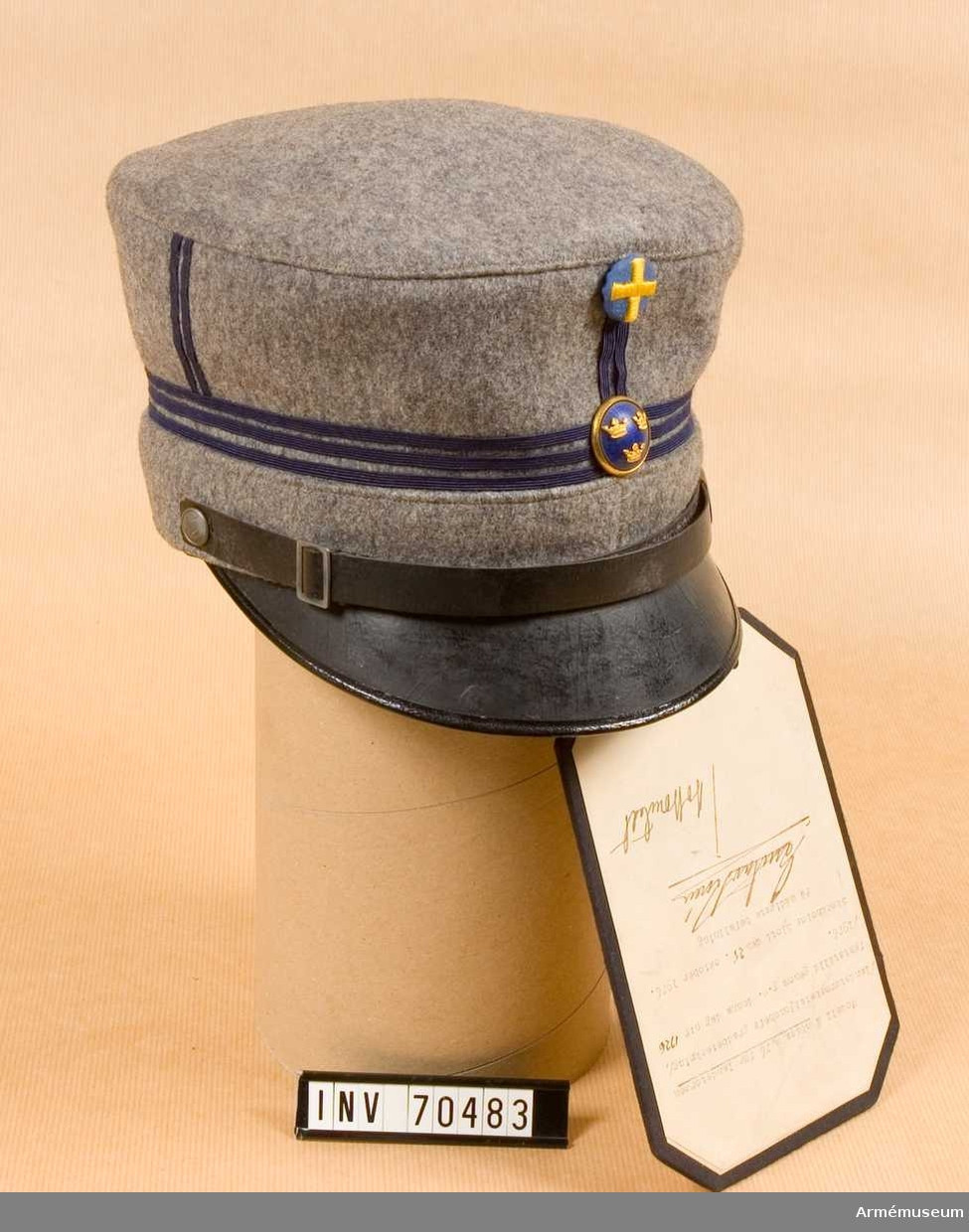
Cap (Mössa m/1926) with battalion commander's rank insignia.

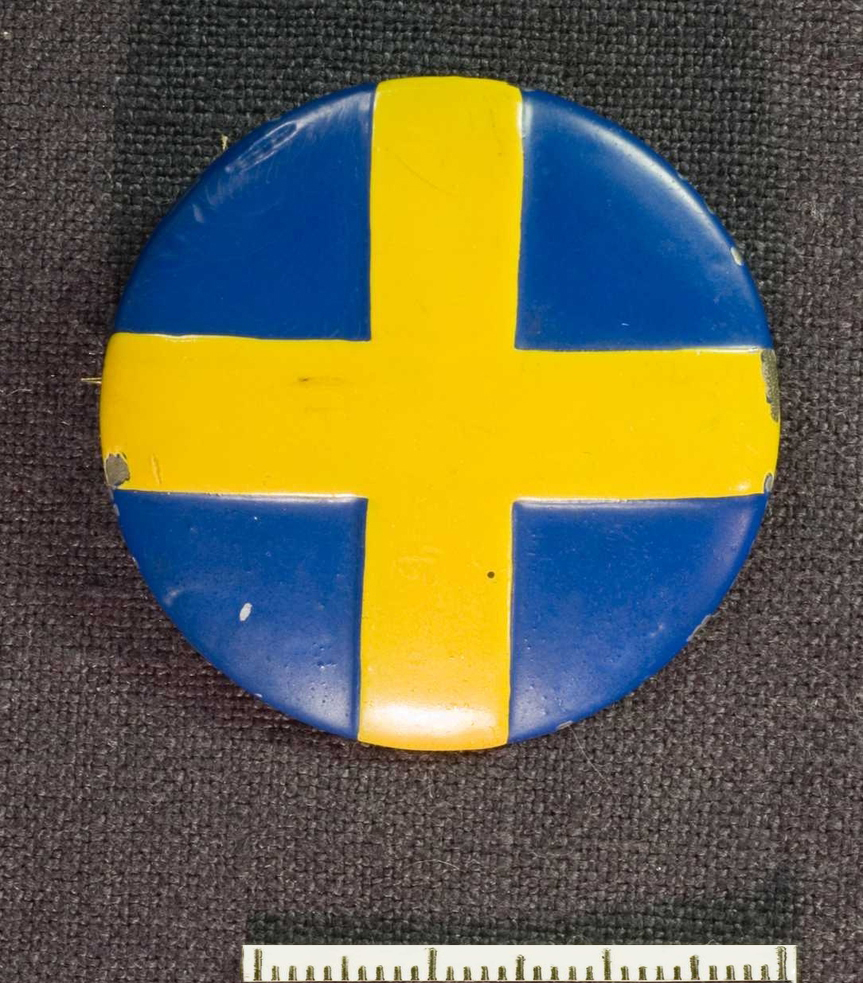
The yellow cross on a blue background distinguished the landstorm

== Police force ==
Between 1941 and 1949, there was Landstormspolis ("Landstorm Police") in Sweden, which was a term for military police personnel, intended primarily for guarding communication facilities, power plants and industries in the event of war. The Landstormspolis's tasks were taken over by the Bevakningspolisen ("Surveillance Police"), which was part of the civil defence.

== See also ==
- Federation of Landstorm Associations Medal of Merit
