= Gotland Military Command =

- Gotlands militärkommando
- Active: 1942–2000
- Country: Sweden
- Allegiance: Swedish Armed Forces
- Type: Military district (1942–1966); Military command (1966–2000)
- Part of: Defence Staff (1942–1966); Milo Ö (1966–1991); Milo M (1991–2000)
- Garrison/HQ: Visby
- Colors: Blue and yellow
- March: "General Wahlgrens marsch" (Sjölin) (Note: The march was established on 13 June 1996.)

Gotland Military Command (Swedish: Gotlands militärkommando, MKG) previously VII Military District (Swedish: VII. militärområdet) was a military district, and later a command in the Swedish Armed Forces. It existed between the years 1942 and 2000. The staff of the military district was located within Gotland Garrison in Visby on Gotland.

== History ==
Gotland Military Command was established on 1 October 1942 as the VII Military District (VII. militärområdet) and was commanded by a military commander which had the responsibility of the territorial and land operational task. In 1966 the name was changed to Gotland Military Command and was included as a command in the Eastern Military District (Milo Ö). This was done in accordance with the new model in which Gotland was too small for a military district. Simultaneously, the operational tasks of the commanders of the naval commands and destroyer squadrons were given to the military commander, which meant that the military commander had full responsibility for the overall operational management of all military forces within the military district.

In 1991, Gotland Military Command became a part of the newly formed Middle Military District (Milo M), but remained as a staff until the Defence Act of 2000, when the staff was phased out and replaced in part by the Gotland Military District (MD G).

== Organisation ==
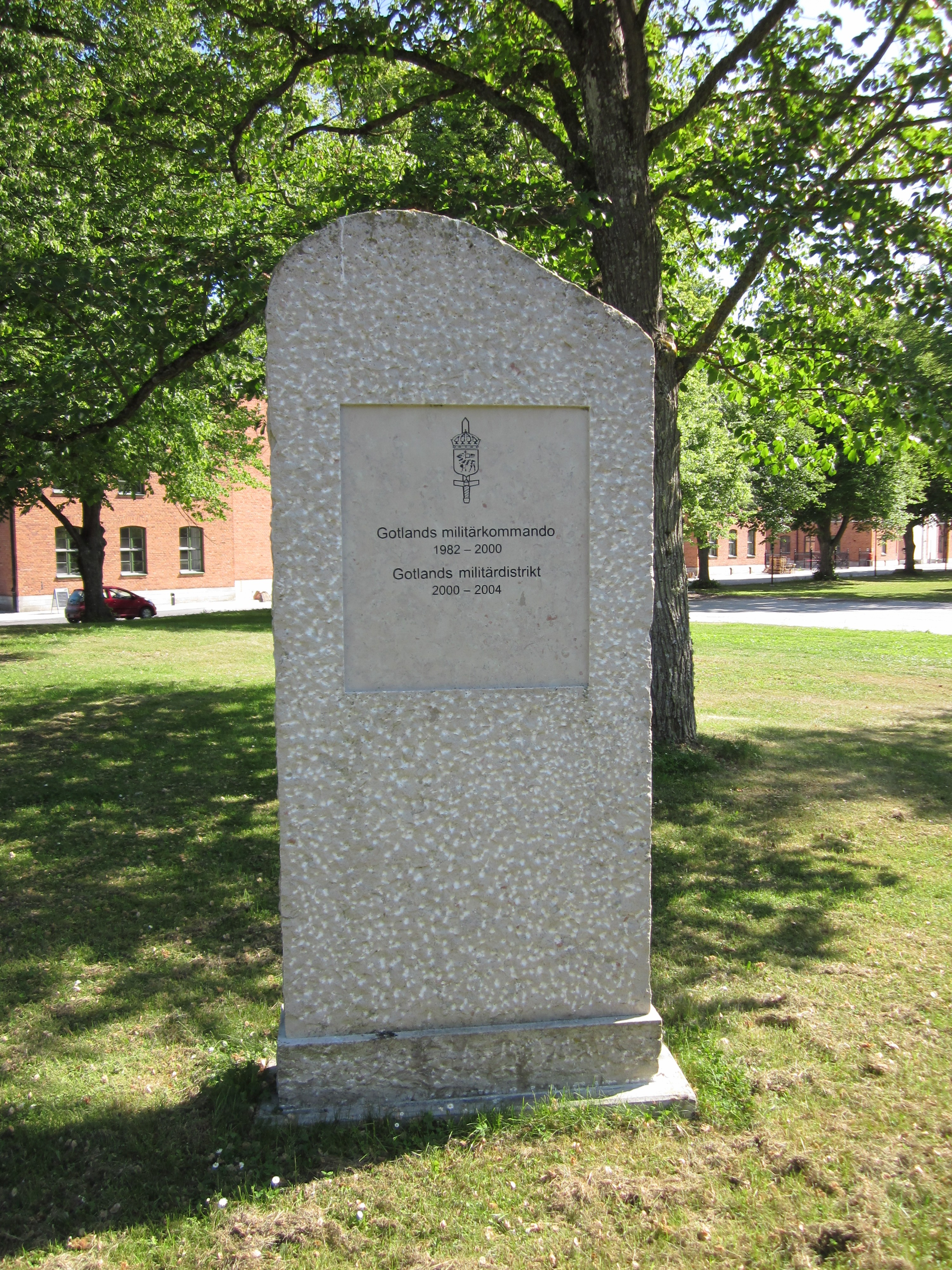
Memorial stone at P 18. Inscription reads: "Gotland Military Command 1982–2000. Gotland Military District 2000–2004."

- A 7 Gotland Artillery Regiment, Visby. (1942–2000)
- KA 3 Gotland Coastal Artillery Regiment, Fårösund. (1942–2000)
- Lv 2 Gotland Anti-Aircraft Corps, Visby. (1963–2000)
- I 18 Gotland Infantry Regiment, Visby (1887–1963)
- P 18 Gotland Regiment, Visby. (1963–2000)
- MD G Gotland Naval District, Visby. (1942–1956)
- MekB 18 Gotland Brigade, Visby. (1949–2000)

== Heraldry ==
The coat of arms of the Gotland Military Command used from 1982 to 1994. Blazon: "Azure, the provincial badge of Gotland, a ram passant argent, armed or, cross and banner gules, staff, edging and five flaps or. The shield surmounted two swords in saltire or."

The coat of arms of the Gotland Military Command Staff (Gotlands militärkommandostab) used from 1994 to 2000 and the Gotland Military District Staff from 2000 to 2004. Blazon: "Azure, the provincial badge of Gotland, a ram passant argent, armed or, cross and banner gules, staff, edging and five flaps or. The shield surmounted an erect sword or".

Coat of arms of the Gotland Military Command 1982–1994.

Coat of arms of the Gotland Military Command Staff 1994–2000 and the Gotland Military District Staff 2000–2004.

== Commanding officers ==
The rank abbreviations refer to rank when the person took command and after any promotion in that position.

=== VII Military District ===
- 1942-10-01 – 1948-09-30: Maj. Gen. Samuel Åkerhielm
- 1948-10-01 – 1955-03-31: Maj. Gen. Ivar Backlund
- 1955-04-01 – 1955-09-30: Maj. Gen. Thord Bonde
- 1955-10-01 – 1957-03-31: Maj. Gen. Hilding Kring
- 1957-04-01 – 1959-09-30: Maj. Gen. Regner Leuhusen
- 1959-10-01 – 1963-09-30: Maj. Gen. Fale Burman
- 1963-10-01 – 1966-09-30: Maj. Gen. Karl Gustaf Brandberg

=== Gotland Military Command ===
- 1966-10-01 – 1968-09-30: Maj. Gen. Karl Gustaf Brandberg
- 1968-10-01 – 1971-09-30: Maj. Gen. Fredrik Löwenhielm
- 1971-10-01 – 1980-09-30: Maj. Gen. Kjell Nordström
- 1980-10-01 – 1983-03-31: Maj. Gen. Bengt Tamfeldt
- 1983-04-01 – 1988-03-31: Maj. Gen. Lars-Eric Wahlgren
- 1988-04-01 – 1994-06-30: Maj. Gen. Sven-Åke Jansson
- 1994-07-01 – 2000-06-30: Maj. Gen. Göran De Geer

=== Chiefs of Staff ===
Chiefs of Staff of MB and MKG:

- 1937-07-01 – 1938-09-30: MAJ B S Pontén, (Gst)
- 1938-10-01 – 1940-09-30: MAJ W C G Möller, (Gst)
- 1940-10-01 – 1943-09-30: MAJ/LTC Nils Falk, (Gst)
- 1943-10-01 – 1944-06-30: LTC B Ingvarsson, (Gst)
- 1944-07-01 – 1945-09-30: MAJ Arne Francke, (Gst)
- 1945-10-01 – 1949-03-31: MAJ Stig Hamilton, (Gst)
- 1949-04-01 – 1952-03-31: MAJ Nils Juhlin, (Gst)
- 1952-04-01 – 1956-09-30: MAJ S Eriksson, (Gst)
- 1956-10-01 – 1961-03-31: MAJ/LTC Åke Bernström, (Gst)
- 1961-04-01 – 1964-03-31: MAJ/LTC Bertil Creutzer, (Gst)
- 1964-04-01 – 1966-09-30: MAJ/LTC Gustaf Malmström, (Gst)
- 1966-10-01 – 1969-03-31: LTC Eric Jarneberg, (KA)
- 1969-04-01 – 1972-09-30: LTC Sven-Åke Adler, (KA)
- 1972-10-01 – 1975-09-30: LTC Lennart Sölvinger, (KA)
- 1975-10-01 – 1978-09-30: LTC Svante Kristensson, (KA)
- 1978-10-01 – 1982-09-30: LTC Per Lundbeck, (KA)
- 1982-10-01 – 1986-09-30: LTC Göte Dygéus, (KA)
- 1986-10-01 – 1993-04-30: LTC C Eklund, (KA)
- 1993-05-01 – 1995-09-30: LTC Anthonie (Tonie) Fåhraeus, (KA)
- 1995-10-01 – 1998-03-31: COL Bengt Delang, (KA)
- 1998-04-01 – 2000-06-30: LTC/COL Jörgen Bergmark, (KA)

== Names, designations and locations ==
Name	Translation	From		To
VII. militärområdet	VII Military District	1942-10-01	–	1966-09-30
Gotlands militärkommando	Gotland Military Command	1966-10-01	–	2000-06-30
Avvecklingsorganisation	Decommissioning Organisation	2000-07-01	–	2001-03-31
Designation		From		To
VII.		1942-10-01	–	1966-09-30
MKG		1966-10-01	–	2000-06-30
Location		From		To
Visby Garrison		2000-07-01	–	2001-03-31
