= Swedish Civil Protection Association Merit Badge =

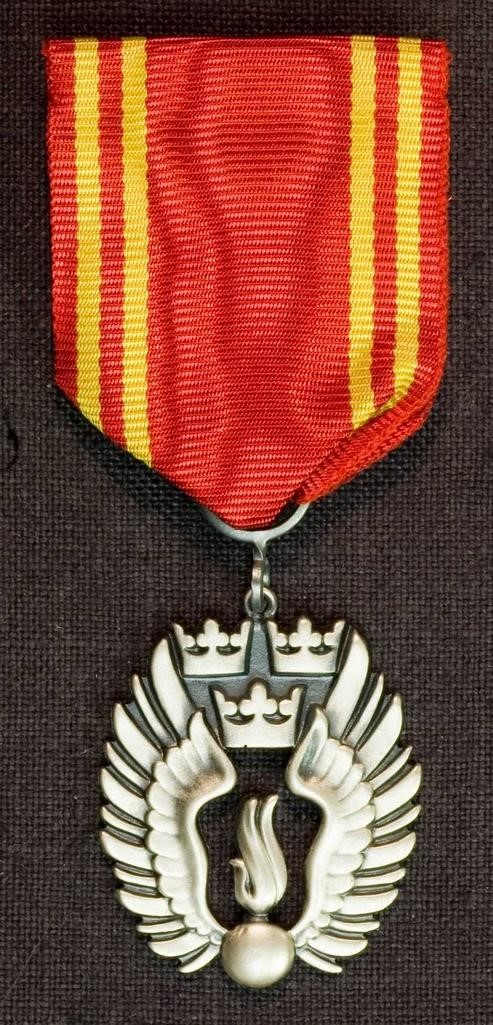
- The medal in silver.
- Type: Category L-medal (Note: Category L: Medals with Authorization to Be Worn on the Swedish Armed Forces Uniforms: Distinctions in this category are worn after those in Category K. This category includes medals for merit or commemoration established by units within the Armed Forces (such as regiments, centers, and schools), the Home Guard, and voluntary defence organizations. It also covers previously approved wear permits for, for example, officers' associations (or similar) and military comrades' associations, as well as other insignia approved by the Swedish Armed Forces Headquarters.)
- Awarded for: For exceptional service
- Country: Sweden
- Presented by: Swedish Civil Protection Association
- Eligibility: Swedish personnel
- Status: Currently awarded
- Established: 10 May 1941
- Ribbon bar

Precedence
- Next (higher): Swedish Civil Protection Association Medal of Merit
- Next (lower): Swedish Civil Protection Association Badge of Honor

The Swedish Civil Protection Association Merit Badge (Note: Translated as the Swedish Civil Protection Association or the Swedish Civil Defence League.) (Swedish: Sveriges Civilförsvarsförbunds förtjänsttecken, SCFGFt/SFt/BFt) is a Swedish medal awarded by the Swedish Civil Protection Association (Sveriges Civilförsvarsförbund, SCF) for sustained, exceptional service in active association work. Typically, it is given in bronze for 3 years of outstanding contributions, in silver after an additional 3 years, and in gold following yet another 3 years of similar dedication.

== History ==
The medal was established on 10 May 1941 as the Swedish National Federation for Civil Air Protection/National Air Protection Federation Merit Badge (Swedish: Sveriges Riksförbund för civilt luftskydd/Riksluftskyddsförbundets förtjänsttecken, RLSfbFt). Due to the association's name change on 17 July 1951, the medal was renamed the Swedish Civil Protection Association Merit Badge (Swedish: Sveriges Civilförsvarsförbunds förtjänsttecken).

== Appearance ==
=== Medal ===
The merit badge consists of the association's emblem, a winged grenade with Three Crowns, 30 x 35 mm in size.

=== Ribbon ===
The ribbon bar consists of a 35 mm wide bright red moiré patterned silk ribbon, with two 2 mm wide yellow stripes on each side, spaced 2 mm apart from each other and parallel to the edge.

== Criteria ==
- Bronze, is typically awarded for 3 years of active association work with contributions beyond the usual.
- Silver, is typically awarded after an additional 3 years of active association work with contributions beyond the usual.
- Gold, is typically awarded after an additional 3 years of active association work with contributions beyond the usual.

== Presenting ==
Awards are presented in solemn forms, usually at a district or association meeting or at another solemn occasion. The medal of merit is usually handed over at the Swedish Civil Protection Association's national assembly. Districts are permitted to annually award a certain number of merit badges as determined by the decision of the National Federation's board. Additionally, the National Federation may award merit badges at its own discretion. As a rule, merit badges are awarded in the order of bronze, silver, and gold. Awards are accompanied by diplomas issued by the Swedish Civil Protection Association.

== Wearing ==
Merit badges and medals of merit may be worn at the same time, but only the highest denomination within each award. Miniatures for the merit badge can be ordered through the national association's office.

== See also ==
- Swedish Civil Protection Association Medal of Merit
