= Landsturm =

Type of German military unit

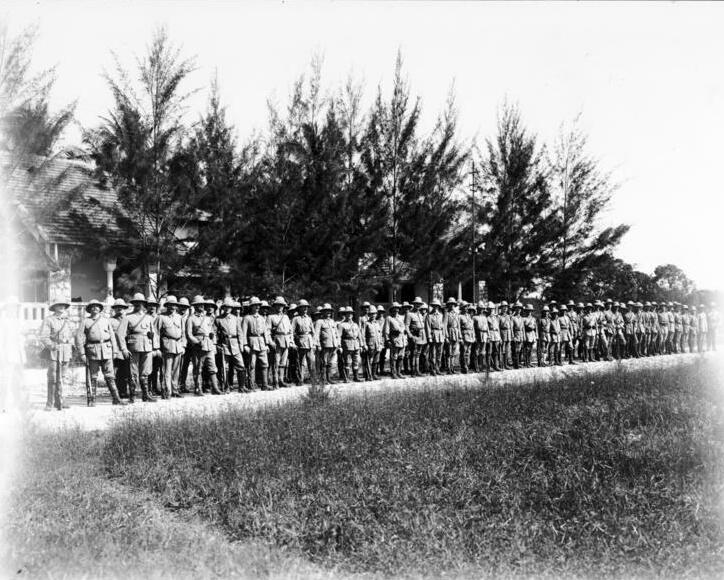
White Landsturm in German East Africa, World War I

In various European countries, the term land storm (German: Landsturm; Dutch: Landstorm; Swedish: Landstorm, roughly "land assault") was historically used to refer to militia or military units composed of conscripts who were not in the regular army. It is particularly associated with Prussia, Germany, Austria-Hungary, Sweden, and the Netherlands.

== Germany ==
=== Prussia from 1813 ===
In Prussia after the Prussian Army Reform of 21 April 1813, all the male population from ages 15 to 60 who were capable of military service and who were not in the standing army or the Landwehr, came under the authority of the Landsturm, which effectively formed the last national military reserve.

King Frederick William III of Prussia established the Prussian Landsturm as irregular military forces on 21 April 1813 by royal edict – the decree appeared in the Preußische Gesetzessammlung (German: Prussian Code of Law) (pp. 79–89). The 1813 edict called for heroic resistance by any means against the French invasion. As a model and an explicit example, it took the Spanish Reglamento de Partidas y Cuadrillas of 28 December 1808 and the decree of 17 April 1809, known as Corso Terrestre, during the Peninsular War against French troops.

According to this edict, all Prussian citizens were obliged to oppose the invasion by the enemy using any weapons available, like axes, pitchforks, scythes, or shotguns (§43). All Prussians were further encouraged to not obey orders by the enemy, but rather to make themselves a nuisance to the French troops however possible. This was a clear departure from ordinary jus in bello (Latin for "Law of War"), which commanded the civilian population to obey the orders of the occupying power, and the police forces to assist the occupying power in crushing any uprising. It did not qualify as an insurgency, but simply as criminal activity. The Landsturm edict explicitly stated that it was preferable to risk the danger brought about by the furies of an armed population rather than to let the enemy have control over the situation. Légitime défense "justified the use of all means" (§7), including chaos.

The edict was modified less than three months later on 17 July 1813 and was purified of its subversive content relative to the laws of war. The war then continued according to the standard rules of conventional warfare. Carl Schmitt qualified the edict as the "Magna Carta of the partisan". Despite its not being put into practice, fascist jurists regarded it in a 1962 lecture in Francoist Spain as the "official document of the legitimation of the partisan of national defence" and as the "philosophical discovery of the partisan".

=== North German Confederation from 1867 ===
The North German Confederation Act of 9 November 1867 about the obligation for wartime military service and the Reich law about the Landsturm of 12 February 1875 restricted the obligation to the period from 17 to 42 years of age.

=== Bavaria from 1868 ===
In the Bavarian Army the oldest ages for compulsory military service since the army reform of 1868 were referred to as the Landsturm.

=== Germany during WW2 ===
The German Defense Act of May 21, 1935, redefined the Landsturm. The Landsturm comprised those German men aged 45 and older who could be called up for military service due to the extension of conscription in times of war and special emergencies. This definition should not be confused with the Volkssturm proclaimed by the Führer directive Of September 25, 1944. The Volkssturm was previously not defined in law.

== Sweden ==
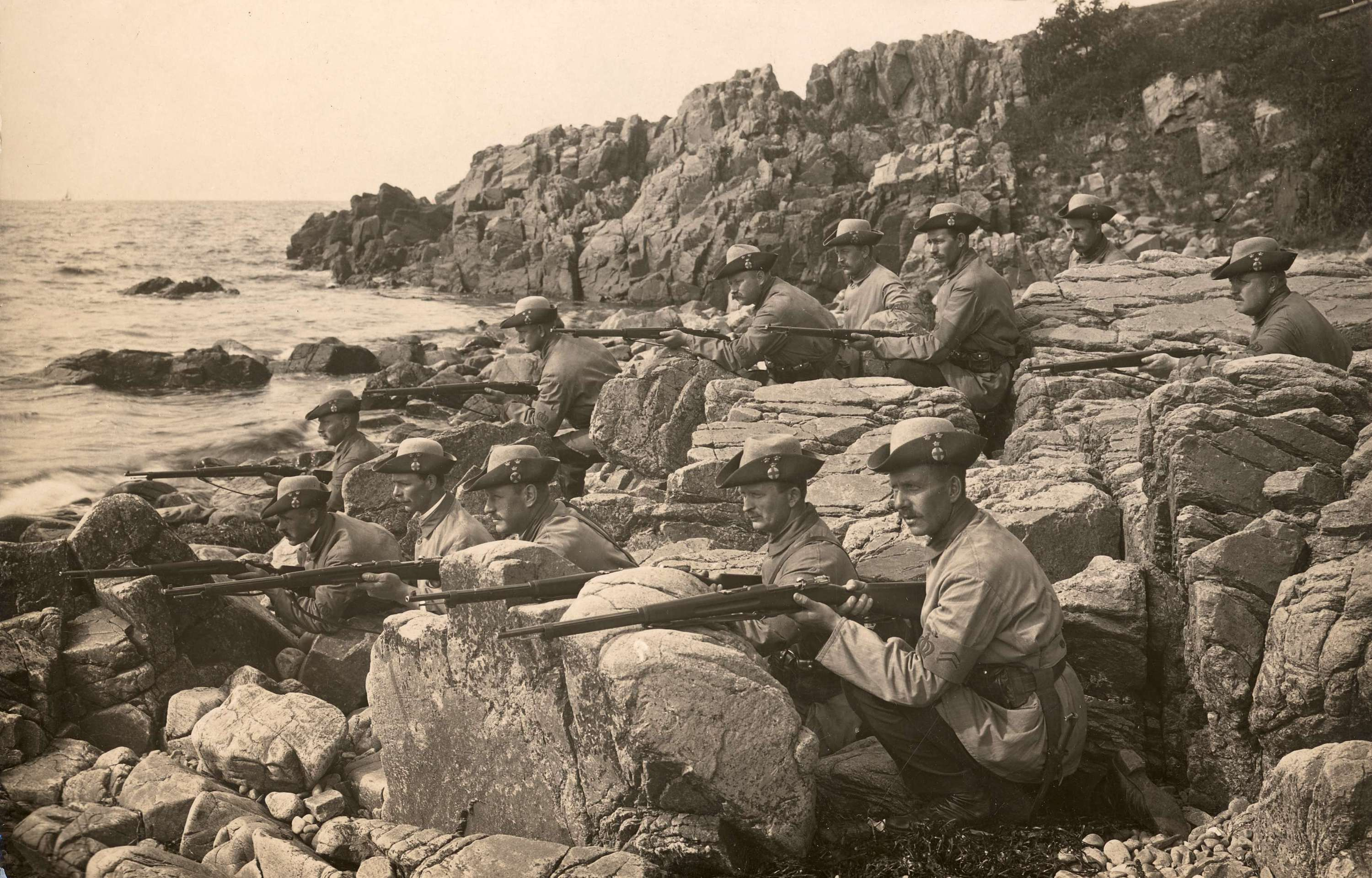
Swedish Landstorm troops in 1914–1915

In February 1808, Russia invaded Swedish Finland and on 14 March Denmark-Norway declared war on Sweden, starting the Finnish War. On the very same day of the Danish declaration of war, Gustav IV Adolf, the Swedish king, issue a decree that ordered the formation of a new military unit, called Lantvärnet, which is the Swedish name for Landwehr. The decree stated that all able unmarried men between 18 and 25 would become eligible to be conscripted for service in Lantvärnet. The plan was that Lantvärnet would consist of 60,000 men, almost at par with the standing army that numbered 66,000 men. However, in reality, Lantvärnet consisted of only circa 30,000 men. The soldiers of Lantvärnet were poorly equipped and they only received their pay on an irregular basis. This led to low morale amongst the men. After the war had ended the common people had a very negative view on Lantvärnet and conscription. Lantvärnet was abolished in 1811. Some believe that the popular resistance against conscription caused by the negative experiences of Lantvärnet lived on for many years and was one of the main causes that Sweden did not reintroduce conscription until 1901.

In 1885, the Swedish parliament passed a law that formed the Swedish Landstorm. All able Swedish males between 27 and 32 would serve in the Landstorm as a territorial defence force in case of war. The Landstorm however then only existed in theory and lacked any organisation; only in the case of war were the Swedish Army to prepare plans and organisations for the Landstorm. In 1892 the law was changed, and all men between 33 and 40 would serve in the Landstorm in case of war. In 1901 Sweden introduced conscription, and became a proper second line unit, organising the elder conscripted men (those between 33 and 40), and were tasked with territorial defence as well as securing the mobilisation of the field army. In 1914 the law was changed and the Landstorm was to organise all men between 35 and 42. Also, a mandatory 5 days refresher training was mandated for all those that belonged to the Landstorm. During World War I, The Landstorm was frequently mobilised to secure Swedish neutrality.

The Landstorm was again mobilised during World War II. In 1942 the Swedish Army went through a major re-organisation and the Landstorm was abolished and incorporated into the regular army.

== Switzerland ==
In the Swiss Army, the Landsturm was, until 1995, the third age class (men from 42 to 50) after the Elite (men from 18 to 32) and the Landwehr (men from 32 to 42).

== See also ==
- 34th SS Volunteer Grenadier Division "Landstorm Nederland", Dutch Waffen-SS volunteer organisation in World War II
- Corso Terrestre (see Francisco Javier Mina Larrea and Francisco Espoz y Mina, guerrilleros of the Peninsular War)
- Home guard
- Irregular warfare
- Law of war
- Levée en masse
- Militia
- Volkssturm
