= Swedish Civil Protection Association Medal of Merit =

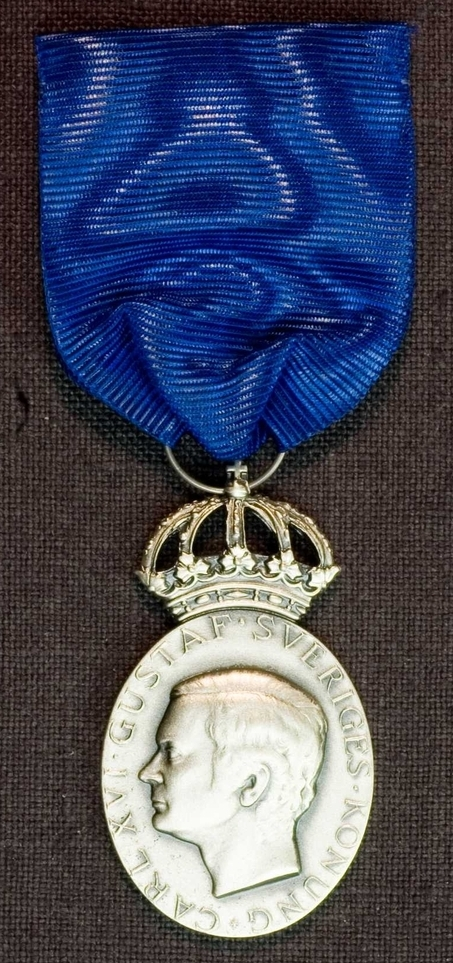
- The medal in silver.
- Type: Semi-official medal (Note: Category K of semi-official medals include, with His Majesty the King's permission established and with his approval, medals (badges) awarded by various organizations. The medals has often the king's image on the obverse.)
- Awarded for: For meritorious service
- Country: Sweden
- Presented by: Swedish Civil Protection Association
- Eligibility: Swedish personnel
- Status: Currently awarded
- Established: 1941
- Ribbon bar

Precedence
- Next (lower): Swedish Civil Protection Association Merit Badge

The Swedish Civil Protection Association Medal of Merit (Note: Translated as the Swedish Civil Protection Association or the Swedish Civil Defence League.) (Swedish: Sveriges Civilförsvarsförbunds förtjänstmedalj, SCFGM/SM) is a Swedish medal awarded by the Swedish Civil Protection Association (Sveriges Civilförsvarsförbund, SCF) for meritorious service.

== History ==
The medal was established on 25 August 1941 as the Swedish National Federation for Civil Air Protection/National Air Protection Federation Medal of Merit (Swedish: Sveriges Riksförbund för civilt luftskydd/Riksluftskyddsförbundets förtjänstmedalj, RLSFM). On 17 July 1951, the medal change name to Swedish Civil Protection Association Medal of Merit (Swedish: Sveriges Civilförsvarsförbunds förtjänstmedalj).

== Appearance ==
=== Medal ===
The medal is on the obverse fitted with the King's portrait and the inscription CARL XVI GUSTAF SVERIGES KONUNG ("CARL XVI GUSTAF KING OF SWEDEN")( (Note: Carl XVI Gustaf since 1973. Before him, Gustaf VI Adolf (1950–1973) and Gustaf V (1941–1950).) (since 1973). On the reverse, its fitted is the association's emblem, a winged grenade with Three Crowns, and the inscription SVERIGES CIVILFÖRSVARSFÖRBUND ("SWEDISH CIVIL PROTECTION ASSOCIATION") (Note: The current inscription was added on 17 July 1951.) as well as a plate for engraving the recipient's name and year of awarding. The medal is crowned with a royal crown.

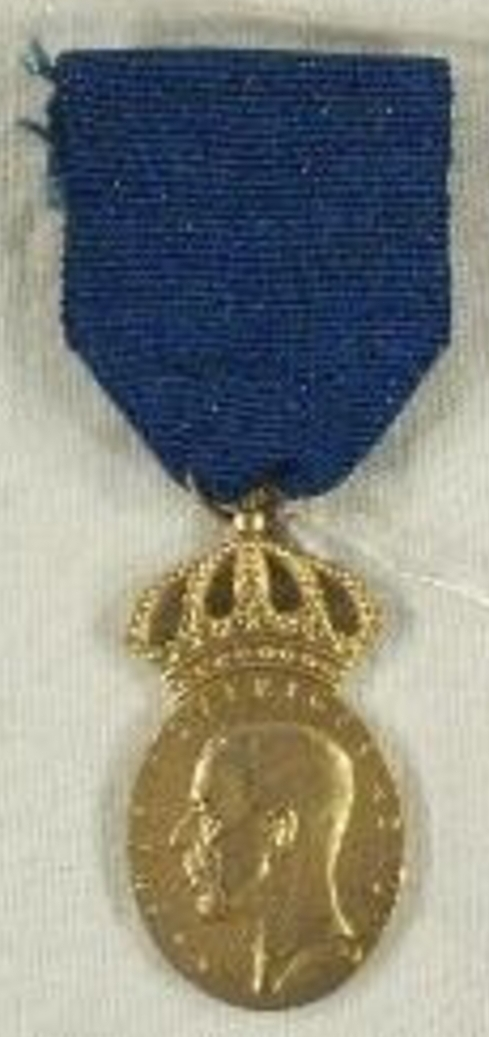
Gold medal from 1947 with Gustaf V pictured

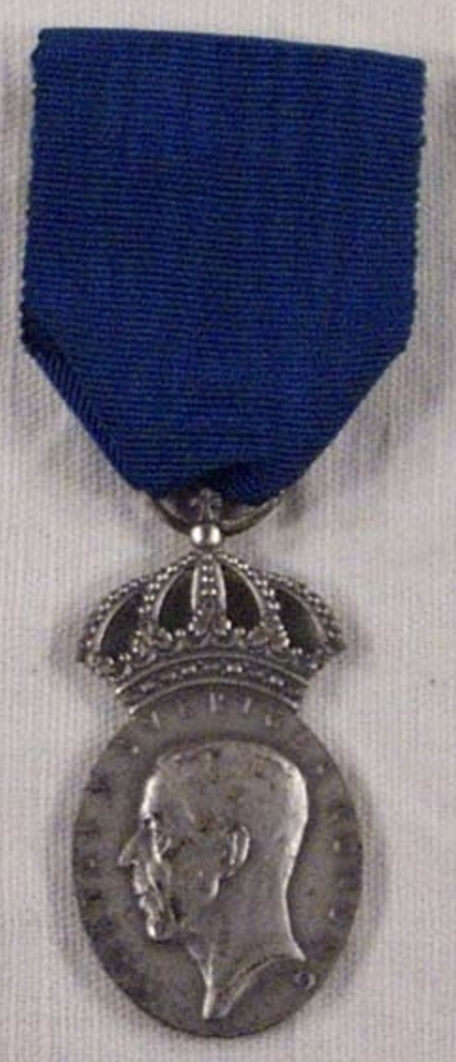
Silver medal from 1943 with Gustaf V pictured

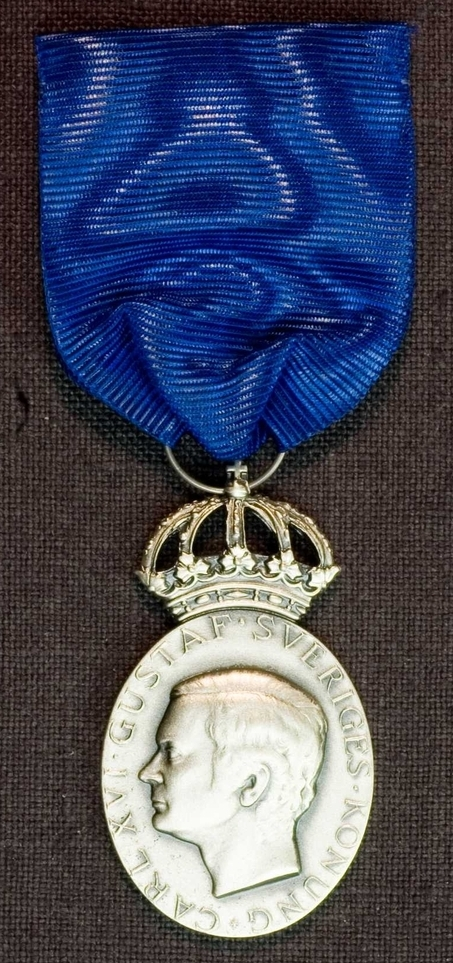
Silver medal with Carl XVI Gustaf pictured

=== Ribbon ===
The medal is attached to a 35 mm wide dark blue ribbon with moiré pattern.

== Criteria ==
=== Gold ===
The gold medal is usually awarded for at least 10 years of particularly meritorious service at national or district level and for exceptional contributions at association level. As a rule, the gold medal should only be awarded to those who have previously received the silver medal.

=== Silver ===
The silver medal is usually awarded for at least 5 years of meritorious service at national or district level and for exceptional contributions at association level. As a rule, the silver medal should not be awarded before the person in question has previously received the Swedish Civil Protection Association Merit Badge in gold.

== Presenting ==
Awards are presented in solemn forms, usually at a district or association meeting or at another solemn occasion. The medal of merit is usually handed over at the Swedish Civil Protection Association's national assembly. As a rule, the quota of ten gold medals and thirty silver medals should not be exceeded at each meeting. If there are special reasons, the number may be exceeded following a decision by the national board and can also be awarded on other occasions than the national assembly. The right to propose the award of medals of merit belongs to a member of the national board, district board or association board. The national board decides on the awarding of medals of merit. Awards are accompanied by diplomas issued by the Swedish Civil Protection Association.

== Wearing ==
Medals of merit and merit badges may be worn at the same time, but only the highest denomination within each award. Miniature medals for the medal of merit can be ordered through the national association's office.

== See also ==
- Swedish Civil Protection Association Merit Badge
