= Swedish Federation for Voluntary Defence Education and Training Medal of Merit =

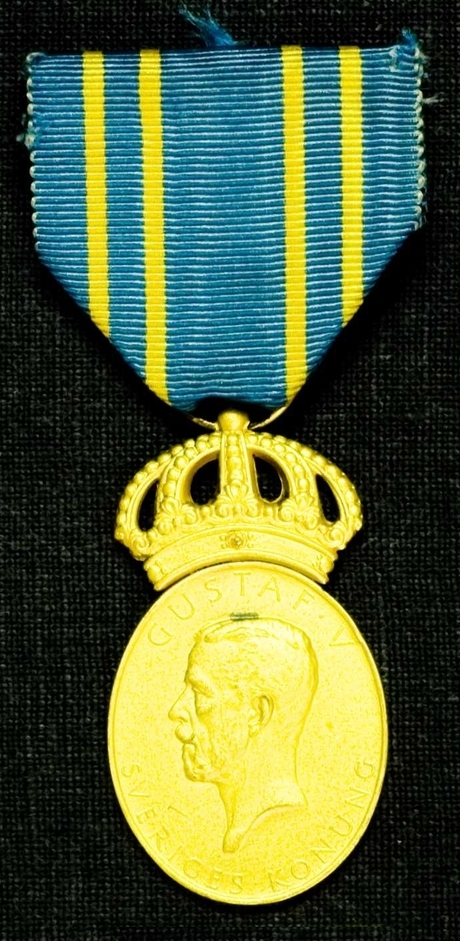
- Pre-1943 medal.
- Type: Semi-official medal (Note: Category K of semi-official medals include, with His Majesty the King's permission established and with his approval, medals (badges) awarded by various organizations. The medals has often the king's image on the obverse.)
- Awarded for: Meritorious work and good personal efforts within the Swedish Federation for Voluntary Defence Education and Training
- Country: Sweden
- Presented by: Swedish Federation for Voluntary Defence Education and Training
- Eligibility: Swedish and foreign personnel
- Status: Currently awarded
- Established: 1922
- Ribbon bar

The Swedish Federation for Voluntary Defence Education and Training Medal of Merit (Swedish: Försvarsutbildarnas förtjänstmedalj, FöutbGM/SM) awarded by the Swedish Federation for Voluntary Defence Education and Training and its predecessors since 1922. Its awarded for meritorious work and good personal efforts within the federation.

== History ==
The medal, originally called the Federation of Landstorm Associations Medal of Merit (Swedish: Sveriges landstormsföreningars centralförbunds förtjänstmedalj, LandstGM/SM), which is a semi-official royal medal of merit, was originally approved and confirmed by His Majesty the King on 13 January 1922. In 1943 it was renamed the Swedish Central Federation for Voluntary Military Training Medal of Merit (Swedish: Centralförbundet för befälsutbildnings förtjänstmedalj, CFBGM/SM), in connection with the landstorm changing its name to the Swedish Central Federation for Voluntary Military Training. It was again granted a gracious permit not later than 28 February 1974. In 2006, the medal was renamed the Swedish Federation for Voluntary Defence Education and Training Medal of Merit after the organization changed its name the year before to the Swedish Federation for Voluntary Defence Education and Training.

== Appearance ==
=== Medal ===
The medal consists of a 31 mm high and 27 mm wide oval medal in gold and silver corresponding to the 8th size and above is provided with a royal crown. The obverse shows His Majesty the King's picture in the inscription "CARL XVI GUSTAF THE KING OF SWEDEN". The reverse shows at the top the Swedish Federation for Voluntary Defence Education and Training's heraldic coat of arms (azure, a cross on a chief azure fesswise three open crowns or) surrounded by two crossed stylized twigs and below "Svenska Försvarsutbildningsförbundet". The ribbon of blue quilted silk with two yellow stripes on each side, is 35 mm wide (proportions 3,2,3,2,15,2,3,2,3) The medal is characterized by oxidized gilded controlled silver and oxidized controlled silver, respectively.

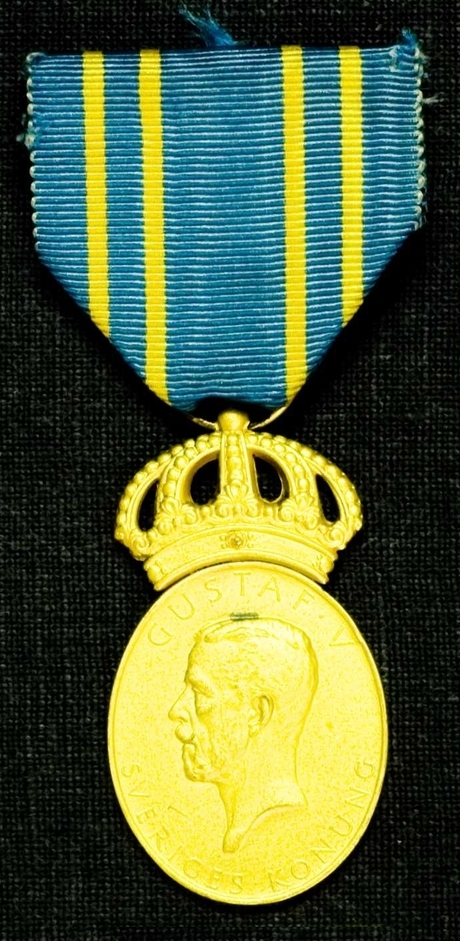
Pre-1943 medal in gold (obverse). Picture of Gustaf V.

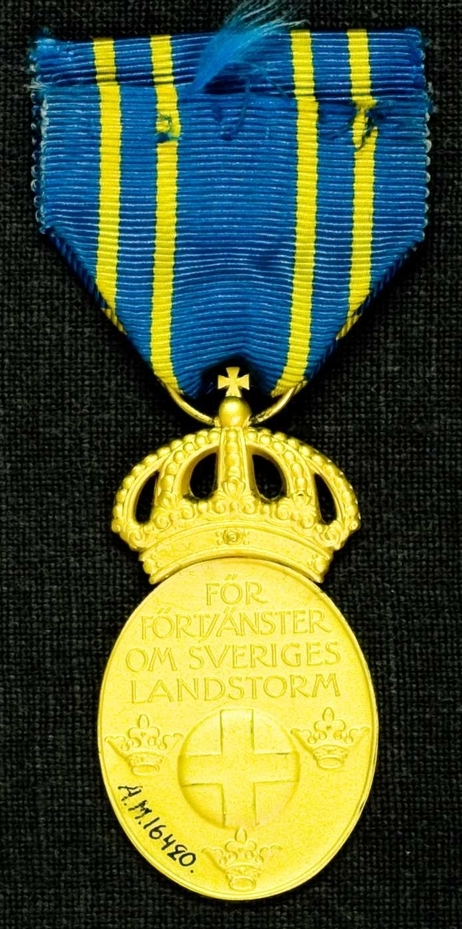
Pre-1943 medal in gold (reverse).

=== Ribbon ===
The ribbon is of blue silk moiré with two yellow stripes on each side.

== Criteria ==
=== Gold medal ===
The medal is awarded to Swedish or foreign citizens in recognition of meritorious work and good personal efforts within the Swedish Federation for Voluntary Defence Education and Training's area of activity, and this during long-term activities, usually at least 20 years, which have given particularly fruitful results. As a rule, the person in question should have previously been awarded the silver medal. A maximum of 10 medals should be awarded per financial year.

=== Silver medal ===
The medal is awarded to Swedish or foreign citizens in recognition of meritorious work and good personal efforts within the Swedish Federation for Voluntary Defence Education and Training's area of activity, and this for multi-year dedicated work, usually at least 10 years. As a rule, the person in question should have previously been awarded the merit badge, and the silver medal is usually awarded no earlier than 3 years thereafter. A maximum of 30 medals should be awarded per financial year.

== See also ==
- Swedish Federation for Voluntary Defence Education and Training Merit Badge
