= Gustaf Adolf Boltenstern =

Swedish equestrian

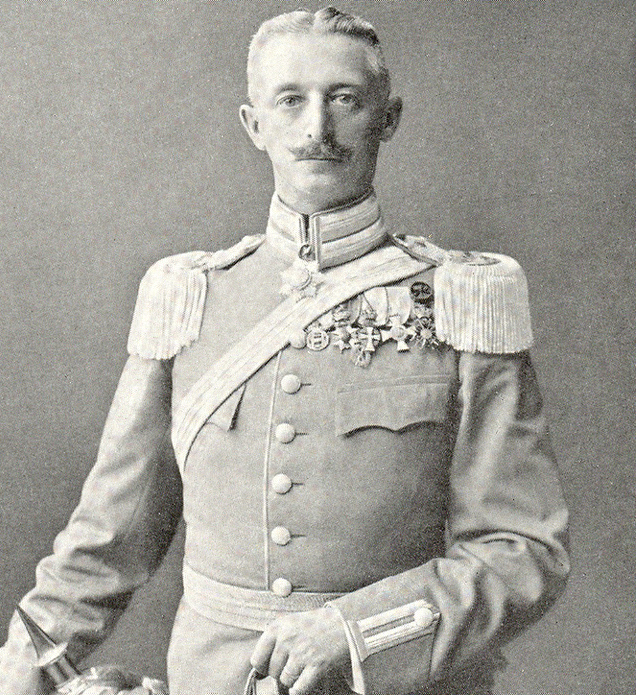
- Gustaf Adolf Boltenstern in 1912
- Born: Gustaf Adolf Boltenstern; 1 April 1861; Helsingborg, Sweden
- Died: 9 October 1935 (aged 74); Stockholm, Sweden
- Relatives: Gustaf Adolf Boltenstern, Jr. (son)
- Military career
- Branch: Swedish Army
- Service years: 1882–1921
- Rank: Colonel
- Commands: Riding School (1908–12); Life Regiment Dragoons (1915–21)

Gustaf Adolf Boltenstern (1 April 1861 – 9 October 1935) was a Swedish officer and horse rider.

== Early life ==
Boltenstern was born on 1 April 1861 in Helsingborg, Sweden, the son of major Gösta Boltenstern and his wife Charlotte von Boltenstern.

== Career ==
=== Military career ===
Boltenstern was commissioned as an officer in 1892 and was assigned with the rank of underlöjtnant to the Life Guards of Horse in 1882. He attended the royal riding school in Vienna, Austria from 1884 to 1885 and served as a stablemaster at the Swedish Army Riding and Horse-Driving School at Strömsholm Palace from 1896 to 1899. Boltenstern was promoted to ryttmästare in 1898 and to major in 1908. He was then head of the Swedish Army Riding and Horse-Driving School from 1908 to 1912 when he was promoted to lieutenant colonel in the Life Regiment Hussars. He was promoted to colonel in 1915 and was appointed executive commander of the Life Regiment Dragoons, serving until 1921.

=== Sports career ===
Boltenstern competed in the individual dressage at the 1912 and 1920 Summer Olympics. He won a silver medal in 1912 with his horse Neptun, but eight years later he and his horse Iron were disqualified.

== Personal life ==
In 1889, Boltenstern married Amelie von Dardel (1866–1919), the daughter of cabinet chamberlain Fritz von Dardel and Baroness Augusta Silfverschiöld.

His son Gustaf Adolf Boltenstern, Jr. won four Olympic medals in dressage in 1948–1956.

== Dates of rank ==
- 1882 – Underlöjtnant
- 18?? – Lieutenant
- 1898 – Ryttmästare
- 1908 – Major
- 1912 – Lieutenant colonel
- 1915 – Colonel
