= Gustaf Adolf Boltenstern Jr. =

Swedish officer (1904–1995)

Gösta Boltenstern
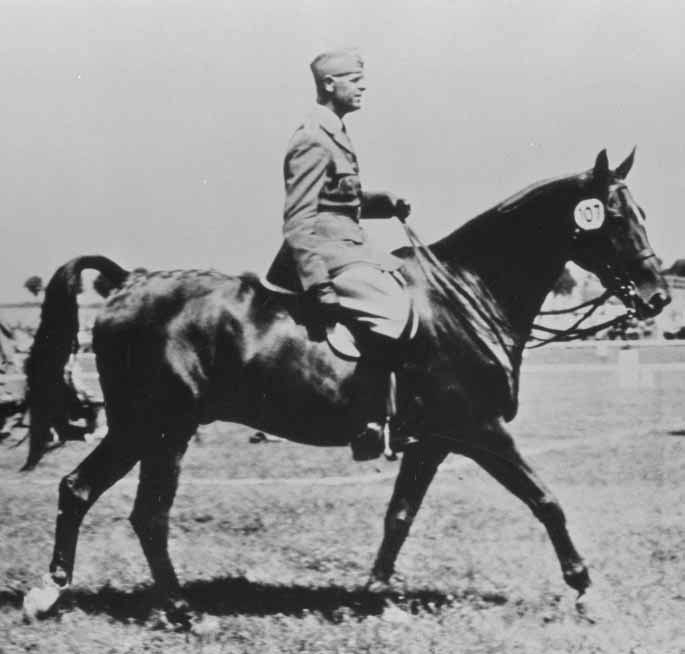
- Gösta Boltenstern circa 1951.
- Born: Gustaf Adolf Boltenstern; 15 May 1904; Stockholm, Sweden
- Died: 31 March 1995 (aged 90); Mariefred, Sweden
- Relatives: Gustaf Adolf Boltenstern (father)
- Military career
- Branch: Swedish Army
- Service years: 1925–1954
- Rank: Major
- Commands: Herrevad Abbey Remount Depot (1954–57)
- Other work: Equerry (1957–1969), Crown Equerry (1969–)

Gustaf Adolf "Gösta" Boltenstern Jr. (15 May 1904 – 31 March 1995) was a Swedish army officer and horse rider who competed at the 1932, 1948, 1952 and 1956 Summer Olympics.

== Military career ==
Boltenstern was born on 15 May 1904 in Stockholm, Sweden, the son of Colonel Gustaf Adolf Boltenstern and his wife Amelie (née von Dardel). He was commissioned as an officer in 1925 and attended the Saumur Cavalry School in France in 1931. Boltenstern became ryttmästare in 1940. Boltenstern was teaching at the Army Riding School from 1942 to 1954 and was appointed Major in 1953. He was placed in the reserve in 1954 and was head of the Herrevad Abbey Remount Depot from 1954 to 1957 and served as Equerry at the Royal Majesty's court from 1957. In 1969, Boltenstern was appointed Crown Equerry.

== Sports career ==
Olympic medal record

Equestrian

Representing Sweden
Gold medal – first place	1952 Helsinki	Team dressage
Gold medal – first place	1956 Stockholm	Team dressage
Silver medal – second place	1932 Los Angeles	Team dressage
Bronze medal – third place	1948 London	Individual dressage

Boltenstern rode as a child and started competing in 1927, after which he, with the exception of 1931, when he was commanded to the Cavalry School in Saumur, France, every year participated in equestrian competitions in Sweden. His most successful horses were: FOX, Vitalis, Nalle-Puh ("Winnie the Pooh"). The foremost success was the victory in Jönköping in 1932 in a difficult dressage competition. During the Nordic Equestrian Competitions in Oslo in 1929, in Stockholm in 1930 and in Copenhagen, he won a prize in the dressage competition with Fox and Vitalis.

In 1932 he and his horse Ingo were part of the Swedish dressage team which won the silver medal in the team dressage, after finishing eighth in the individual dressage.

Sixteen years later he competed again at the Olympics and won the bronze medal with his horse Trumf in the 1948 individual dressage. The Swedish team won the gold medal in the team event, but was disqualified because one of its members was not a legitimate military officer.

In 1952 he won his gold medal with the Swedish team in the team competition, after finishing fourth with his horse Krest in the individual dressage. In 1956 he and his horse Krest won their second gold medal with the Swedish dressage team. In the individual dressage they finished seventh.

== Personal life ==
In 1929, Boltenstern married Britt Floderus (born 1908), daughter of Colonel Ernst Floderus and Majken (née Själander). He was the father of Claes (born 1935).

== Dates of rank ==
- 1925 – Second lieutenant
- 19?? – Lieutenant
- 1940 – Ryttmästare
- 1953 – Major

== Awards and decoration ==
- (Sweden) Knight of the Order of the Sword
- (Sweden) H. M. The King's Medal
- (West Germany) Grand Cross of Merit of the Order of Merit of the Federal Republic of Germany (23 June 1970)
- (Liberia) Commander of the Order of the Star of Africa
- (Thailand) Commander of the Order of the White Elephant
- (Denmark) Knight of the Order of the Dannebrog
- (Sweden) Swedish Military Sports Association's gold medal with wreath (Sveriges militära idrottsförbunds guldmedalj med krans)
- (Sweden) Swedish equestrian sport badge of honor (Svensk ridsports hederstecken)
