= Ernst Linder =

Swedish Army officer

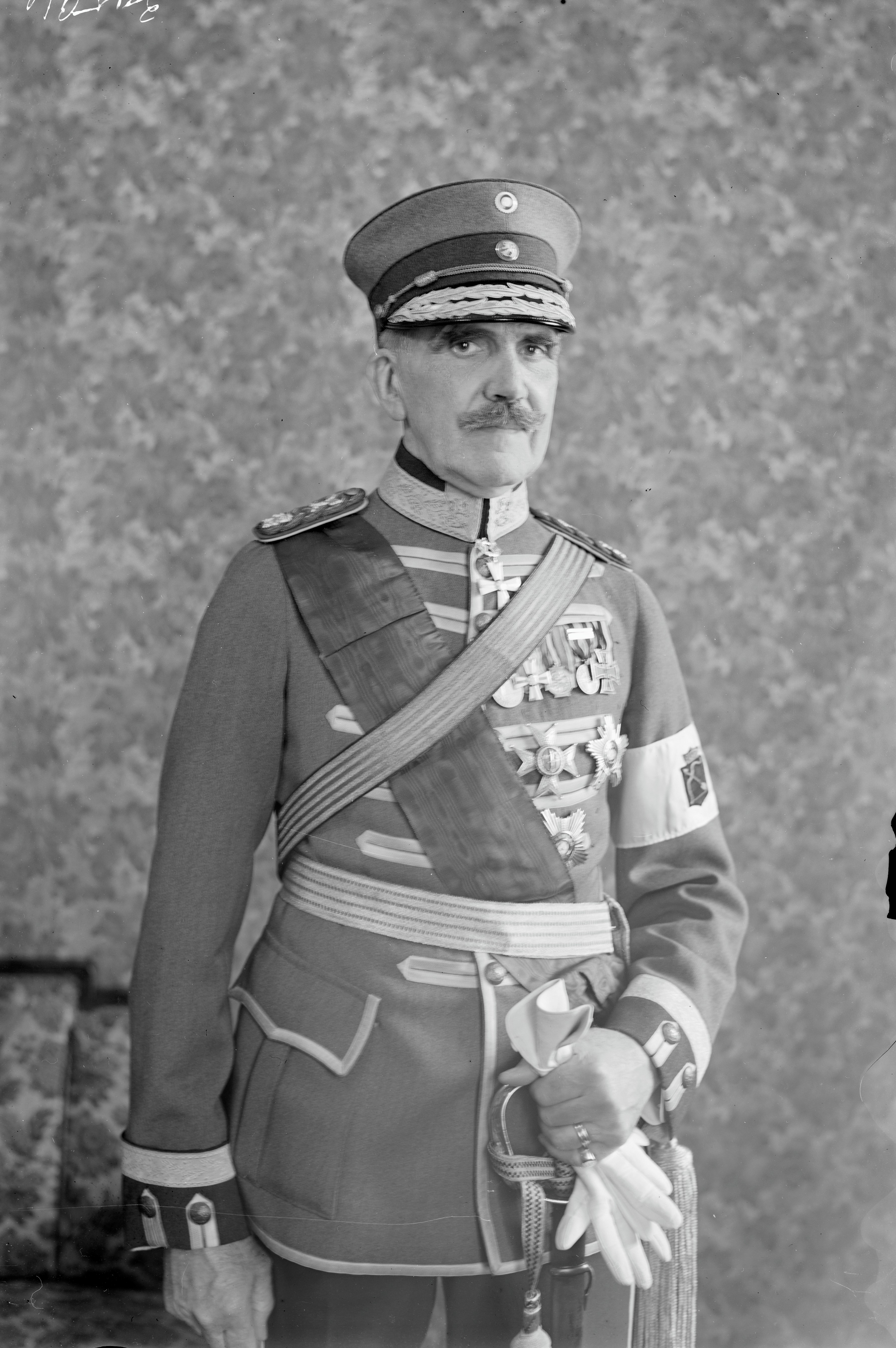
- Ernst Linder as a Finnish Major General, 1937
- Born: 25 April 1868; Pohja, Finland
- Died: 14 September 1943 (aged 75); Stockholm, Sweden
- Burial place: Norra begravningsplatsen
- Military career
- Allegiance: Sweden (1887–1918, 1920–1939); Finland (1918–1920)
- Branch: Swedish Army; White Guard; Finnish Army
- Service years: 1889–1927; 1939–1940
- Rank: Major General (Sweden); Lieutenant General (Finland); General of the Cavalry (Finland)
- Commands: Riding School; Inspector of Cavalry; Swedish Volunteer Corps; Lapland Area of operations
- Conflicts: Finnish Civil War; Battle of Tampere; World War II; Winter War

Ernst Linder (25 April 1868 – 14 September 1943) was a Swedish-Finnish military officer and accomplished equestrian. He began his military career in Sweden, becoming a second lieutenant in the Life Guards of Horse in 1889. He trained extensively in Sweden and Germany, attending the Swedish Infantry Gunnery School, the Military Riding Institute in Hanover, and the Royal Swedish Army Staff College. He served as a military attaché in Paris and London (1909–1911), during which he promoted aviation by establishing Sweden's first aviation prize. Linder held key leadership positions in the Swedish Army, including chief of the Army Riding and Horse-Driving School, and rose to major general in the reserve by 1927.

During the Finnish Civil War in 1918, Linder resigned from Swedish service to join the Finnish Army, becoming the first Swedish officer to do so. He commanded the Satakunta and Savo Groups, leading operations that captured key towns such as Pomarkku, Ikaalinen, Kotka, and Hamina. He was promoted to Finnish major general and served as inspector to the Regent of Finland before returning to the Swedish Army reserve in 1920. Linder, then 71-years-old, also participated in the Winter War (1939–1940) as commander of the Swedish Volunteer Corps and later the Lapland Operational Area, reaching the rank of Finnish general of cavalry.

Parallel to his military career, Linder was a top-level equestrian, winning Sweden's first eventing competition and an Olympic gold medal in Paris in 1924. He held leadership roles in numerous equestrian clubs and federations and authored detailed accounts of the Finnish Civil War and Winter War, as well as publications on cavalry and equestrian training.

== Early life ==
Linder was born on 25 April 1868 at Åminne in Pohja, Uusimaa Province, Finland, the son of the landowner, politician and writer Ernst Linder (1838–1868) and the philanthropist and donor Maria Lavonius (1846–1915). Linder's father, a liberal and politically active member of the Diet of Finland of 1863/64 and 1867, died a few weeks after his son's birth; he had contracted typhus while helping those affected by the severe crop failure of the 1867 famine, who had gone south in large numbers. Linder moved with his mother to Sweden, and when he grew up he chose a military career. In 1872, Linder's mother remarried to the consul and donor Oscar Ekman.

== Career ==
=== Early military career ===
Linder became a second lieutenant in the Life Guards of Horse in 1889. He attended the Swedish Infantry Gunnery School in 1893 and the Military Riding Institute Hanover in Hanover, Germany from 1893 to 1895. He attended the Royal Swedish Army Staff College from 1900 to 1902 and served as a General Staff aspirant from 1903 to 1905.

He was a military attaché in Paris and London from 1909 to 1911, during which he established the first Swedish aviation prize (for a flight across the Öresund Strait). In 1912, he led the first rider expedition to the London International Horse Show (prior to the Olympic Games).

Linder was chief of the Swedish Army Riding and Horse-Driving School from 1912 to 1915. He was promoted to lieutenant colonel in the Life Guards of Horse in 1915, colonel in the army in 1918, and major general in the army reserve in 1927.

=== Finnish Civil War (1918) ===
At the outbreak of the Finnish Civil War in 1918, Linder resigned from Swedish service and became the first Swedish officer to join the Finnish Army. He initially commanded the Satakunta Group, whose front stretched from the Gulf of Bothnia to Kuro with a width of 110 km. He captured places such as Pomarkku, Lavia, and Lassila, and won battles at Ikaalinen and Kyröskoski.

He later participated in the Tampere operation, liberating Pori and Rauma and occupying the entire Pori railway line. Subsequently, he became commander of the Savo Group, taking Kotka and Hamina. After the fall of Tampere, Linder was promoted to Finnish major general. He remained in the Finnish Army until 1920 and served as inspector to the Regent of Finland in 1919. After returning to Sweden, he entered the Swedish Army reserve.

He also served as honorary chief of the Häme Cavalry Regiment, the Satakunta Protection Corps, and the Svartå Protection Corps, and led the Samhällshjälp Protection Group from 1923 to 1928.

=== Equestrian achievements ===
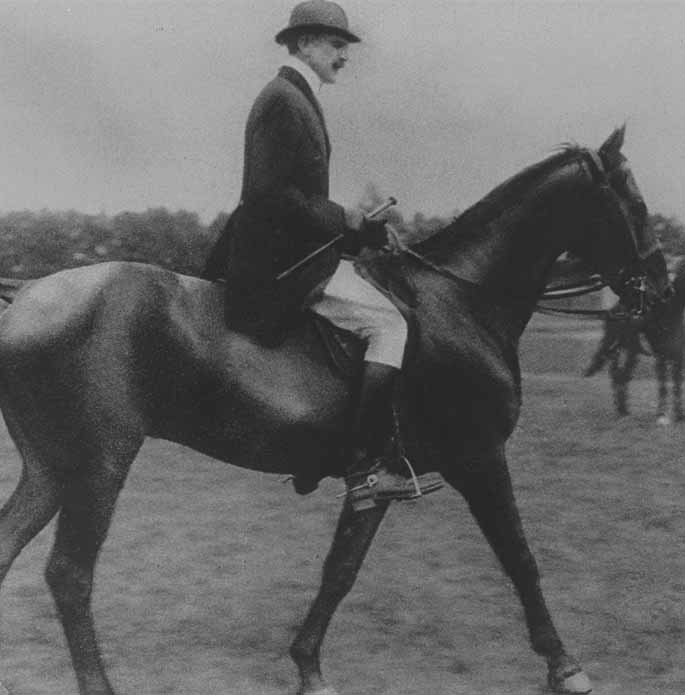
Linder in the 1924 Olympics

Linder was one of Sweden's most successful riders. He won Sweden's first eventing competition, succeeded in steeplechase races from his early officer years into his fifties, defeated Europe's top riders in show jumping across continental Europe and London, and won a gold medal with his horse Piccolomini in the individual dressage at the Olympic equestrian competition in Paris in 1924.

Despite his relatively high weight, Linder was a good race rider, starting in around 80 races between 1891 and 1918 and winning 20. In dressage, Linder won 5 times, in show jumping 9 times and in eventing 1 time. He has won his competition successes mainly thanks to exceptionally careful preparations.

He was master of the Stockholm Cross Country Riding Club from 1896 to 1900, secretary of the Jockey Club from 1905 to 1907, member from 1908 and vice chairman from 1933 to 1943. He was an honorary member of the Stockholm Cross Country Riding Club (from 1918), the Stockholm Racing Society (Stockholms kapplöpningssällskap) (member from 1915, vice chairman 1931-33, honorary member from 1930), the Finnish Equestrian Federation, and the Danish Astronautical Society, among others.

=== Civil aviation contributions ===
During his time as a military attaché, Linder recognized the future importance of aviation for transportation and warfare. He established the first Swedish aviation prize in 1910 (for the Öresund flight). He was a co-founder and long-term chairman of AB Aerotransport (ABA).

He also initiated and led the Nordic Finland Week in Stockholm in 1925 and served as chairman of the Sweden-Finland Society (Samfundet Sverige-Finland) from 1920 to 1943.

=== Winter War (1939–1940) ===
At the outbreak of the Winter War in 1939, Linder, who had been promoted to Finnish lieutenant general in 1938, resigned from the Swedish Army reserve and entered active Finnish service as commander of the Swedish Volunteer Corps in northern Finland. His headquarters were first in Tornio and later in Rovaniemi.

At the end of February 1940, he became commander of the Lapland Operational Area, covering northern Finland above Oulu. After the end of the war, he was appointed Finnish general of cavalry.

=== Publications ===
Linder authored detailed accounts of the Finnish Civil War and the Winter War, which are valuable historical sources due to their thorough documentation: From Finland's Freedom War (1920), After Sixteen Years: A Retrospective on My Participation in Finland's Freedom War (1935), On Finland’s Second Freedom War (brochure, 1942). He also wrote on equestrian and military topics, including: Study Trips to Foreign Riding Schools 1913 (1920) and On the Cavalry: Some War Experiences (1930). Additionally, he published numerous articles on military, equestrian, and political subjects, especially regarding Finland and Finland–Sweden relations.

== Personal life ==
Enrst Linder was married three times:

- 1) Married 30 August 1894 (–1905) at Toppeladugård Castle, Genarp, Malmöhus County, to Baroness Augusta Wrangel von Brehmer, born 22 April 1874 there, died 25 April 1910 in Stockholm, Hedvig Eleonora Parish, daughter of the Hovjägmästare Baron Helmuth Wrangel von Brehmer and Ingrid Charlotta Christopherson.
- 2) Married 13 September 1905 in Stockholm, Life Guards of Horse Parish, to Baroness Märta Johanna Fredrika Cederström, born 13 November 1873 at Lövsta, Funbo, Uppsala County, died 15 July 1925 in Djursholm, daughter of Lieutenant Baron Claes Edvard Cederström and Baroness Märta Leijonhufvud, and previously married to Chamberlain Baron Louis De Geer.
- 3) Married 6 May 1927 in Stockholm, Klara Parish (banns in Skeppsholm Parish, Stockholm) to Ylva Wiveka Trolle, born 26 August 1892 at Klågerup Castle, Hyby, Malmöhus County, died 6 October 1974 in Stockholm, Oscar Parish, daughter of the Överhovjägmästare Baron Nils Trolle and Baroness Anna Eleonora Sofia Leijonhufvud, and previously married to Commander Erik Valdemar Hermansson Wrangel.

== Death ==
Linder died on 14 September 1943 at the Red Cross Hospital in Stockholm, Sweden. The funeral service took place on 20 September 1943 in Engelbrekt Church in Östermalm in Stockholm, after which the cremation took place in the Northern Crematorium. He was interred on 2 October 1943 at Norra begravningsplatsen in Solna.

== Dates of rank ==
Linder's ranks:

=== Sweden ===
- 8 November 1889 – Underlöjtnant
- 27 February 1895 – Lieutenant
- 6 October 1905 – Ryttmästare
- 27 August 1912 – Major
- 23 October 1915 – Lieutenant colonel
- 5 February 1918 – Colonel
- 14 January 1927 – Major general (reserve)

=== Finland ===
- 6 April 1918 – Major general
- 25 April 1938 – Lieutenant general
- 1940 – General of the Cavalry

== Awards and decorations ==
=== Swedish ===
- (Sweden) Commander 1st Class of the Order of the Sword (16 September 1928)
- (Sweden) Knight of the Order of the Sword (1910)
- Knight of the Order of Saint John in Sweden (between 1921 and 1925)

=== Foreign ===
- Grand Cross of the Order of the White Rose of Finland (between 1925 and 1928)
- Commander 1st Class of the Order of the White Rose of Finland (between 1918 and 1921)
- (Finland) 1st Class with star and swords of the Order of the Cross of Liberty (between 1921 and 1925)
- (Finland) 1st Class with swords of the Order of the Cross of Liberty (between 1918 and 1921)
- (Finland) 2nd Class with swords of the Order of the Cross of Liberty (between 1918 and 1921)
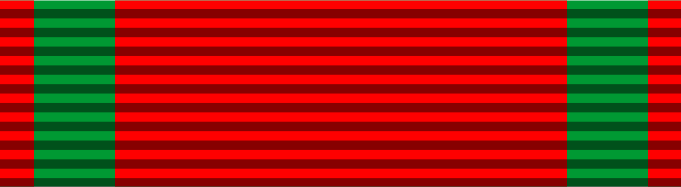
- (Ottoman Empire) 3rd Class of the Order of the Medjidie (before 1915)
- (France) Officer of the Order of Agricultural Merit (before 1915)
- (Austria) Officer of the Order of Franz Joseph (before 1915)
- (Belgium) 1st Class of the Military Cross (before 1915)
- (Chile) 2nd Class of the Order of Merit (between 1915 and 1918)
- (Denmark) Knight of the Order of the Dannebrog (before 1915)
- (France) Knight of the Legion of Honour (before 1915)
- (Kingdom of Prussia) 2nd Class of the Iron Cross
- (Kingdom of Prussia) Knight 3rd Class of the Order of the Crown (before 1915)
- (Kingdom of Prussia) Knight of the Order of Saint John (between 1918 and 1921)

== Honours ==
- Member of the Royal Swedish Academy of War Sciences (1927)

== Bibliography ==
- Linder, Ernst (2016) [1942]. Kring Finlands andra frihetskrig: strödda minnen från min verksamhet [Around Finland's Second War of Independence: scattered memories from my activities] (in Swedish). Stockholm: Svenskt militärhistoriskt bibliotek. ISBN 978-91-88053-24-4. SELIBR 19557494.
- Linder, Ernst (1942). Kring Finlands andra frihetskrig: strödda minnen från min verksamhet [Around Finland's Second War of Independence: scattered memories from my activities] (in Swedish). Stockholm: Norstedt. SELIBR 1410952.
- Linder, Ernst (1941). Mongolinvasionen i Centraleuropa 1241: ett sjuhundraårsminne [The Mongol invasion of Central Europe in 1241: a seven-hundred-year commemoration] (in Swedish). Stockholm: Norstedt. SELIBR 1410953.
- Linder, Ernst (1939). Problemet Sverige-Finland: några uttalanden [The Sweden-Finland problem: some statements] (in Swedish) (2nd ed.). Stockholm: Seelig. SELIBR 1377808.
- Linder, Ernst (1936). Kuudentoista vuoden takaa: katsaus toimintaani Suomen vapaussodassa [Sixteen years ago: a review of my activities in the Finnish War of Independence] (in Finnish). Translated by Frey, S. Helsinki, Otava. SELIBR 2778393.
- Linder, Ernst (1935). Efter sexton år: en återblick på mitt deltagande i Finlands frihetskrig [After sixteen years: a look back at my participation in the Finnish War of Independence] (in Swedish). Stockholm: Victor Petterson. SELIBR 1347966.
- Linder, Ernst (1935). Kavalleriet kan icke undvaras [Cavalry cannot be dispensed with] (in Swedish). Stockholm: Tullbergs, Gen.-stab. lit. anst. SELIBR 1347967.
- Linder, Ernst (1934). Suomen kielikysymys: eräitä näkökohtia : esitelmä "Ruotsalais-suomalainen yhteistoiminta". - nimisessä keskustelukerhossa Tukholmassa 7 p:nä toukok. 1934 [The Finnish language question: some aspects: a presentation at the discussion club "Swedish-Finnish cooperation". - in Stockholm, 7 May 1934] (in Finnish). Helsinki. SELIBR 2778394.
- Linder, Ernst (1934). Några synpunkter på språkfrågan i Finland: föredrag i Stockholm den 7 maj 1934 [Some views on the language question in Finland: lecture in Stockholm on 7 May 1934] (in Swedish). Stockholm: [Seelig]. SELIBR 1347968.
- Linder, Ernst (1930). Om kavalleriet: några krigserfarenheter [About the cavalry: some war experiences] (in Swedish). Stockholm: [Seelig]. SELIBR 1338705.
- Linder, Ernst (1930). Problemet Sverige-Finland: några uttalanden [The Sweden-Finland problem: some statements] (in Swedish). Stockholm: Citytryckeriet. SELIBR 1338706.
- Linder, Ernst (1921). Muistelmia Suomen vapaussodasta [Memoirs of the Finnish War of Independence] (in Finnish). Translated by Väänänen, Kalle. Helsinki. SELIBR 2673163.
- Linder, Ernst (1920). Studieresor till utländska ridskolor 1913 [Study trips to foreign riding schools in 1913] (in Swedish). Stockholm: Norstedt i distr. SELIBR 1655086.
- Linder, Ernst (1920). Från Finlands frihetskrig [From the Finnish War of Independence] (in Swedish). Stockholm: Norstedt. SELIBR 1655085.
- Linder, Ernst. Operationen mot Kuovola, Kotka och Fredrikshamn [The operation against Kuovola, Kotka and Hamina] (in Swedish). [s.l.] SELIBR 2673168.
