= Gustaf Nyblæus =

Swedish Army officer

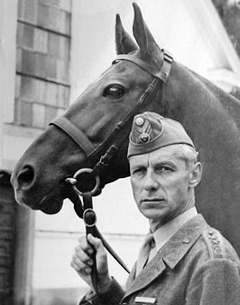
- Born: Gustaf Nils Arvid Nyblæus; 11 December 1907; Skövde, Sweden
- Died: 21 February 1988 (aged 80); Stallarholmen, Sweden
- Military career
- Allegiance: Sweden
- Branch: Swedish Army
- Service years: 1929–1971
- Rank: Colonel
- Commands: Life Guards Squadron; Swedish Army Riding and Horse-Driving School; Strängnäs Defense Area
- Sports career
- Sport: Horse riding
- Club: K1 IF, Stockholm

Gustaf Nils Arvid Nyblæus (11 December 1907 – 21 February 1988) was a Swedish Army officer, equestrian competitor, coach, judge and official.

== Career ==
Nyblæus' father was a major general in the Swedish cavalry and the chairman of the Jury of Appeal for the equestrian events at the 1912 Summer Olympics. His grandfather was gymnast and Swedish Army colonel Gustaf Nyblæus.

Nyblæus studied at the Riding School in 1929–1931 (he later headed it in 1953–1959), and in the early 1930s became a member of the Swedish equestrian team. He competed in eventing at the 1936 Summer Olympics, but failed to finish. He also qualified for the jumping event, but for unknown reasons did not compete. In 1937 Nyblæus won the team dressage title at the Nordic Championships in Helsinki; two years later he won gold medals in the individual jumping and team eventing.

After World War II Nyblæus became an equestrian coach and judge. At the 1948 Summer Olympics he headed the Swedish equestrian team and served as secretary to Carl Bonde, who oversaw the dressage competition. He again acted as Swedish chef d'equipe at the 1956 Olympics, and at the 1960 Games started a two-decades-long career of dressage judge. During that career he attended all major international dressage competitions, and also gave seminars on equestrian judging. In 1965 he was elected as a board member of the International Federation for Equestrian Sports and later promoted to Chairman of the Dressage Committee. He held those positions until 1981, and retired from judging in 1984.

== Personal life ==
From 1931 to 1949, he was married to Dagmar Hamilton (born 1908), the daughter of Lieutenant Colonel, Count Gustaf Hamilton and Baroness Thyra (née von Blixen-Finecke). They divorced and in 1951 Nyblæus married Louise Gyldenstolpe (born 1922), the daughter of PhD, Count Nils Gyldenstolpe and Greta (born Heijkenskjöld).

Nyblaeus died in 1988, aged 80. He was survived by son Gustaf Nyblaeus Jr.

== Awards and decorations ==
- (Sweden) Commander of the Order of the Sword (21 November 1963)

Military offices
Preceded by Harald Strömfelt	Swedish Army Riding and Horse-Driving School; 1953–1959	Succeeded by Hans von Blixen-Finecke Jr.
