= Gustaf Nyblæus (1816) =

Swedish politician (1816–1902)

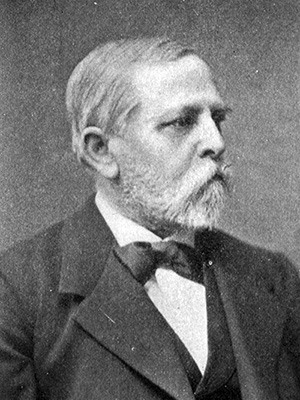
Gustaf Nyblæus

Gustaf Nyblæus (23 March 1816 – 6 October 1902) was a Swedish Army colonel, gymnast and member of the Riksdag. As a politician he worked to make gymnastics a bigger part of school in Sweden.

== Biography ==
Nyblæus was born in Stockholm in 1816. He was the son of Supreme Court justice Gustaf Nyblæus (1783–1849), father of Gustaf Nyblæus (1853–1928), grandfather of Army officer Gustaf Nyblæus (1907–1988) and cousin of philosopher Axel Nyblæus.

Nyblæus was educated at Uppsala University. He became an officer in 1836, major in 1862, lieutenant colonel in 1864 and colonel in the army in 1872. He attended the Royal Central Gymnastics Institute (today the Swedish School of Sport and Health Sciences) from 1836 to 1837, was a junior teacher there from 1838 to 1842, fencing instructor at Lund University from 1842 to 1862, acting director of the Royal Central Gymnastics Institute from 1862 to 1864, and permanent director from 1864 to 1887. From 1862 to 1864, Nyblæus was a member of the committee for the reorganization of the Royal Central Gymnastics Institute, secretary of the Defence Committee from 1861 to 1865, and a member of the Riksdag's lower house Andra kammaren from 1873 to 1875.

He campaigned for more space for applied, more sports-oriented gymnastics, and in 1850 and 1852 traveled around Europe to study the development of gymnastics. His gymnastic writings include Undervisning i gymnastik efter Ling (1847, 2nd edition 1866) and Plastiska kroppsöfningar. Grunddrag till estetisk gymnastik (1882). He also published a number of smaller poems such as "Dalkarlasången" (1840), "Harposlag" (1846) and "Johan Banér. Dikt i 5 sånger".

Nyblæus died in Hedvig Eleonora Parish, Stockholm, in 1902. He is buried in Norra begravningsplatsen.
