= Toppeladugård Castle =

Manor house at Lund Municipality in Scania, Sweden

- Toppeladugårds slott
- Lund Municipality
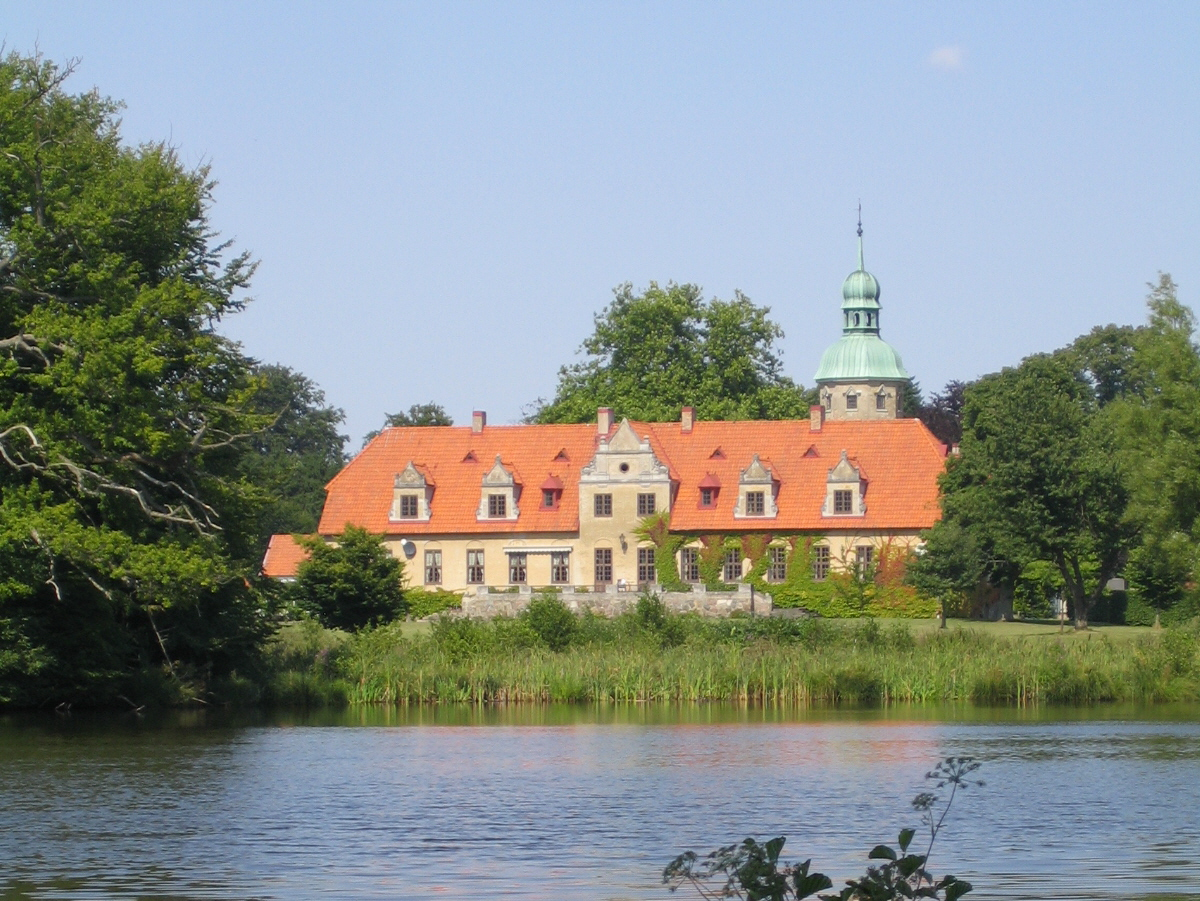
- Toppeladugård Castle

Site information
- Type: Castle
- Open to the public: No

Location
- Scania, Sweden
- Coordinates: 55.595556°N 13.362778°E

Site history
- Built: 1720s

Toppeladugård Castle (Swedish: Toppeladugårds slott) is a manor house at Lund Municipality in Scania, Sweden. Several of the adjoining buildings, as well as the park around the castle, originate from the 18th-century.

== History ==
Originally, Toppeladugård was a smaller farm. Toppeladugård was originally an outbuilding under Häckeberga Castle. In 1720, the property was bought by Christina Piper (1673–1752) who had the first castle built and the Baroque garden created around it.

In 1918, Toppeladugård was acquired by Johan Kuylenstierna. The old three-story buildings were in poor condition at the time of the acquisition and he soon had the main building and the west wing demolished. The current Renaissance style building was erected in 1918–20 the basis of the designs of Lars Johan Lehming (1871–1940).

== See also ==
- List of castles in Sweden
