= Strömsholm Palace =

Royal palace in Hallstahammar Municipality, Sweden

Coordinates: 59°31′29″N 16°16′11″E

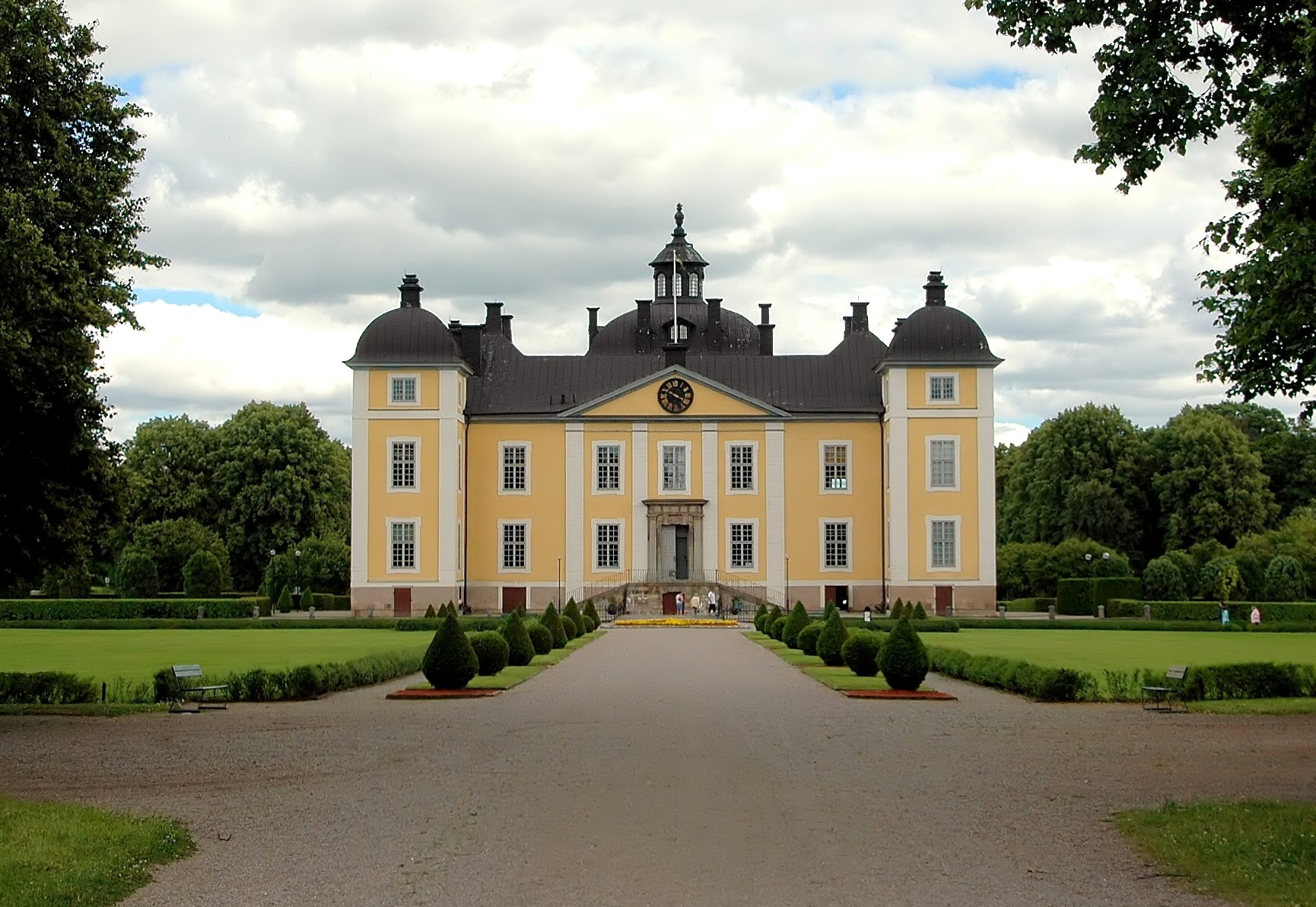
Strömsholm Palace

Strömsholm Palace, sometimes called Strömsholm Castle (Swedish: Strömsholms slott), is a Swedish royal palace. The baroque palace is built on the site of a fortress from the 1550s, located on an island in the Kolbäcksån river at the west end of Lake Mälaren. The palace has interiors from the 18th century and an important collection of Swedish paintings.

== History ==
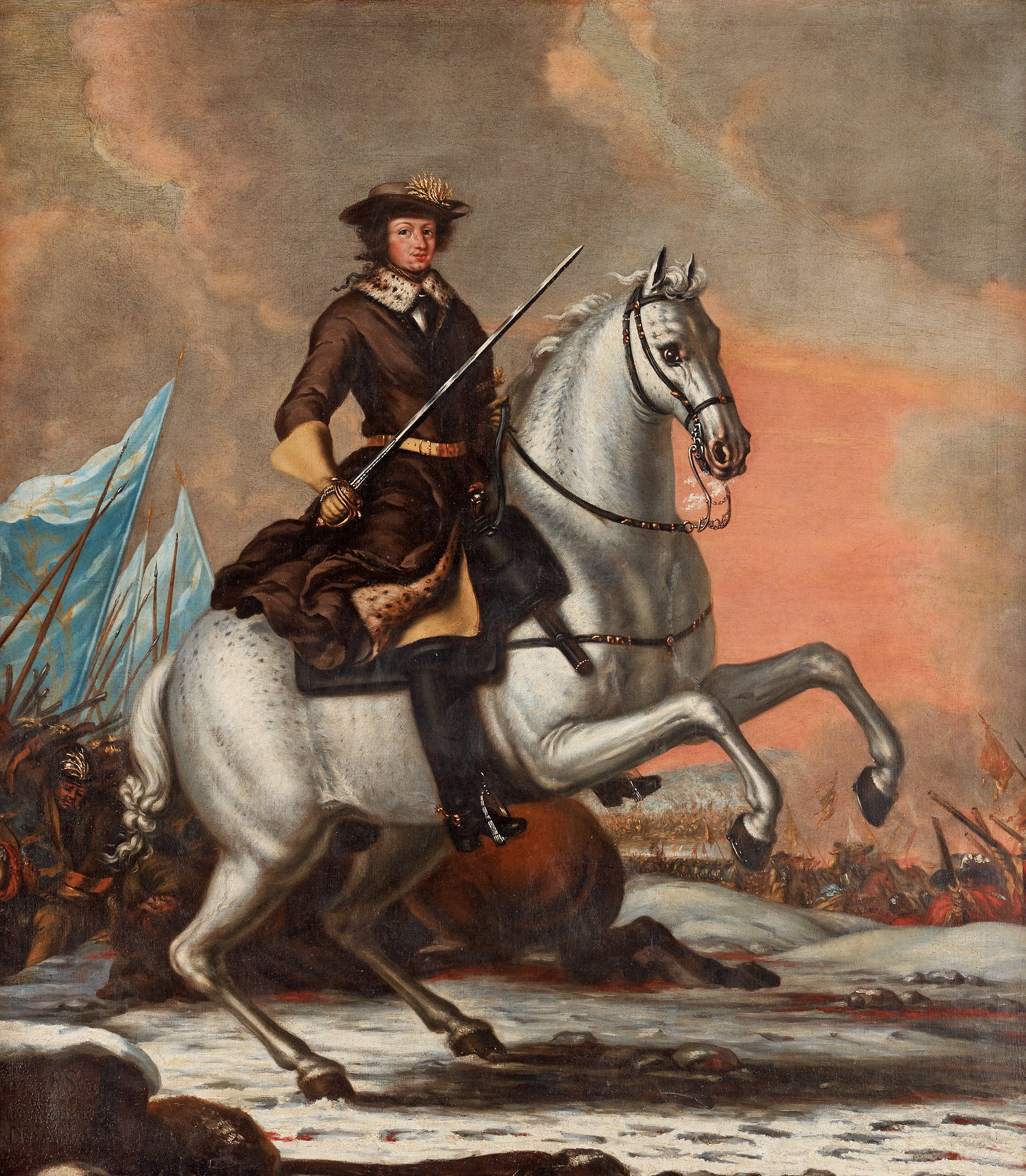
King Charles XI of Sweden, by David Klöcker Ehrenstrahl

King Gustav Vasa had a fortress built at Strömsholm in the 1550s. From 1560 until 1621, it served as the residence of Queen Dowager Catherine Stenbock, and after this, it was given to a later queen dowager, Maria Eleonora of Brandenburg who, however, preferred to reside at Gripsholm Castle. Finally, in 1654, it was given by King Charles X Gustav to Queen Hedvig Eleonora.

The old palace of the 1550s later provided the foundation for the present Strömsholm Palace, built in 1669–1674 for Queen Hedvig Eleonora to a design by Nicodemus Tessin the Elder. The palace consists of a central building framed by four square corner towers. On the park side, there is a large, domed central tower. Around 20 estate buildings were erected at the same time as the palace, and the first stages of a park in the French Baroque style were laid out.

Work on the interiors came to a halt when the building's fabric was completed. Not until the 1730s was the first phase of interior work carried out, including a palace chapel in the attic designed by the Swedish architect Carl Hårleman. The interiors at Strömsholm Palace are largely Gustavian in style. In 1766 the heir to the Swedish throne, later King Gustav III, married Princess Sophia Magdalena of Denmark. As a wedding present from the Riksdag of the Estates, she was given Strömsholm Palace. Extensive interior works commenced, under the architectural direction of Carl Fredrik Adelcrantz, and continued into the 19th century. The queen's bedchamber is a prime example of Swedish interior design from the start of the Gustavian era, as is the Chinese dining room with its fabric-covered walls with Chinese-style paintings by the renowned tapestry painter Lars Bolander.

The palace also houses an important collection of Swedish paintings from the 17th century, amongst others David Klöcker Ehrenstrahl's paintings of King Charles XI's horses. Since the 16th century, Strömsholm has been an equestrian center of Sweden. In the 1550s, King Gustav Vasa reinforced the importance of horses here, by raising horses for the cavalry. The Swedish Army Riding and Horse-Driving School at Strömsholm was a part of the Swedish Army from 1868 to 1968. Today, Strömsholm is used as a hippodrome, where equestrian competitions are held each year.

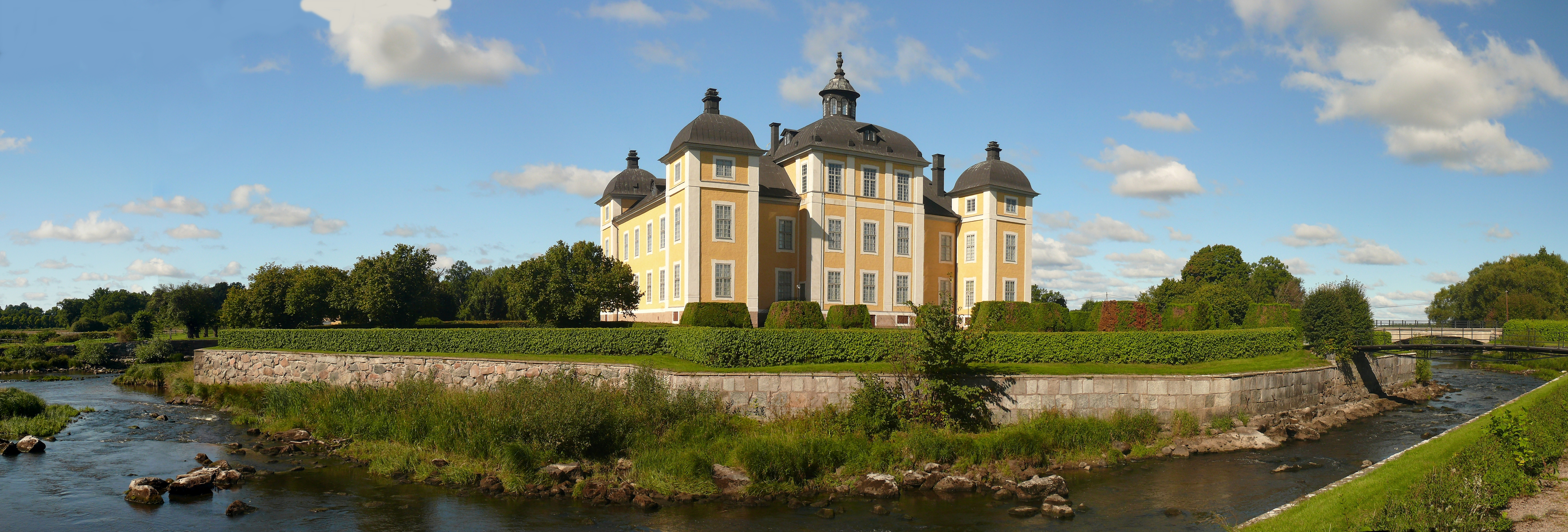
Panorama of Strömsholm Palace

In 1985, the palace underwent major renovation of its façade. Over the years, the exterior had undergone various alterations, but the plasterwork as originally applied in the 1670s was largely intact. The roof was covered with tar shingles until the 19th century, when they were replaced with tin. The palace was restored in stages during the 1990s. The disposition of the rooms in the royal apartments was restored, and the 18th-century furnishings were placed in the correct context. One of the most important features of the restoration was the reproduction of the 1760s wallpaper, the original of which was found in isolation on an attic beam in one of the houses on the estate. Old linen towels were transformed into royal wallpaper.
