= Swedish Army Riding and Horse-Driving School =

- Arméns rid- och körskola
- Active: 1868–1970
- Country: Sweden
- Allegiance: Swedish Armed Forces
- Branch: Swedish Army
- Role: School
- Part of: IV Military District (1942–1966); Eastern Military District (1966–1977)
- Garrison/HQ: Strömsholm Palace

Swedish Army Riding and Horse-Driving School (Swedish: Arméns rid- och körskola, RS) was a Swedish Army equestrian facility which operated from 1868 to 1970. Its tasks from the 1930s were to train commanders at the infantry and cavalry into instructors and more in horse-driving or horse riding. Today the school is one of three national facilities operated by the Swedish Equestrian Federation.

== History ==
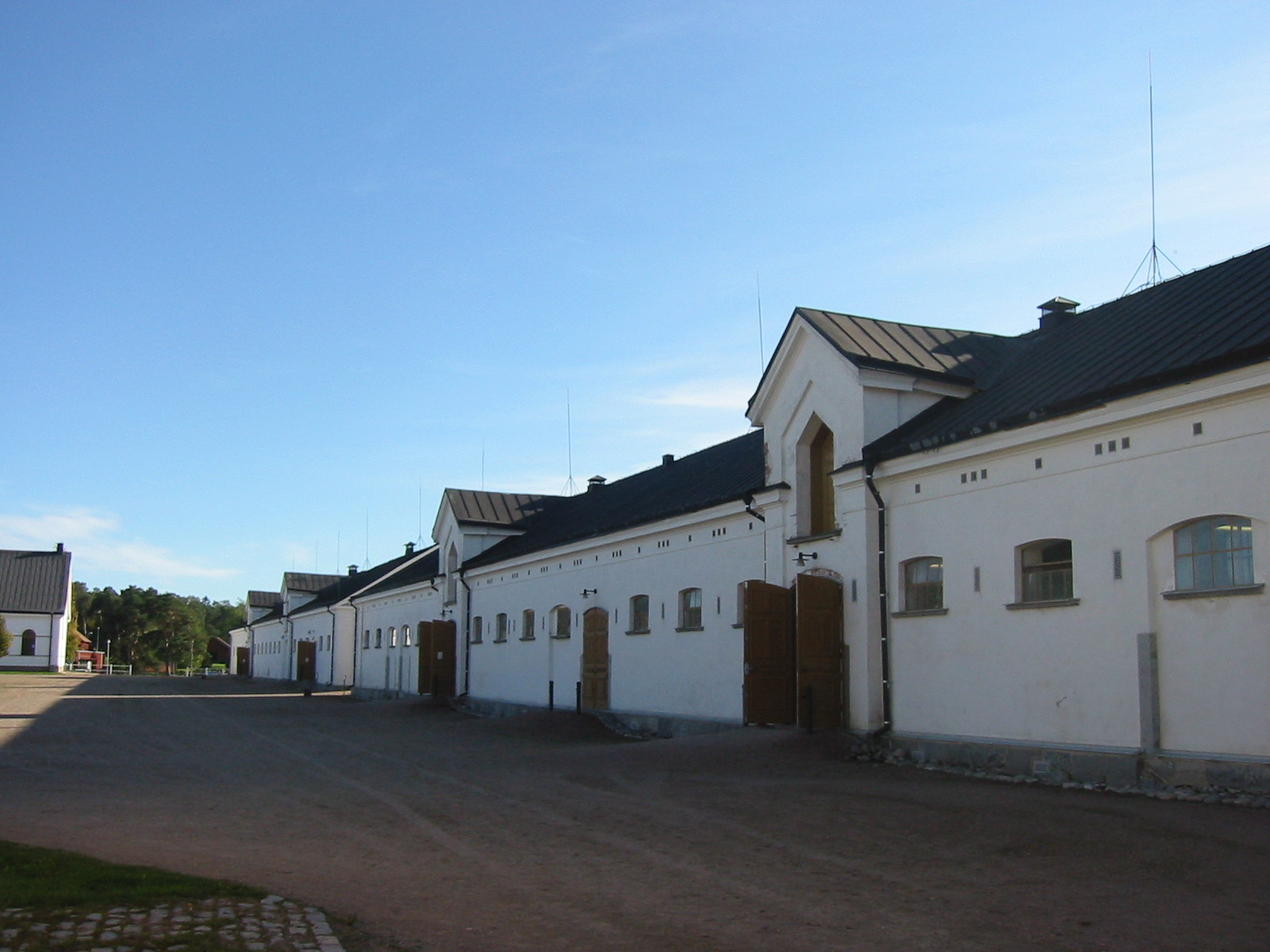
Stables at Strömsholm.

Strömsholm has since the Era of Great Power (1611-1718) been of great significance for the Swedish horse breed, most of them for warmbloods. In 1621 a stud farm was erected to accommodate the royal armies with horses to the constant wars. The riding school at Strömsholm Palace was built in 1868 with the task of providing the cavalry and more with teaching in art of riding, veterinary education, horse hoof fittings, arms and gymnastics. Prior to that, riding schools existed in various cavalry regiments, but otherwise had the training of cavalrymen partly occurred in private. In Europe, there were role models for a uniform military riding school, and eventually it was decided to place the Swedish equivalent to Strömsholm Palace. At the riding school, the cavalry officers would be trained in horseback riding, warfare, arms, veterinary education and more. The first head was Crown Equerry Waloddi Fischerström.

The operations covered the entire kungsgård and had great influence and significance for the area until the closure of 1968. Initially, the stud farm and the riding school had a joint head. During the entire period the operations were located both to the ridge and to the palace area. Military life also influenced the environment through social relations mainly with the mansion owners, but also through the recurring parties and balls at the palace. In 1871, the stud farm was closed down and the operations moved to a stallion depot for about 80 stallions. In 1885, Strömsholm also received a remount depot to provide the army with already trained horses. The operation began to decline in 1956 and the same year some stallions moved to Flyinge kungsgård and the stallion depot was closed down. In the early 1930s, the operations were transformed to a riding and horse-driving school for the entire army. In 1957, the Ridskolan ("Riding School") was renamed Arméns rid- och körskola ("Army Riding and Horse-Driving School"). The tasks was then to train active duty (aktiv stat) commanders at the infantry and cavalry into instructors and more in horse-driving or riding.

In 1968-70, the school was militarily discontinued and taken over by the Society for the Promotion of Riding (Ridfrämjandet) and the Swedish Equestrian Federation (Svenska ridsportens centralförbund). At the closure of Army Riding and Horse-Driving School at Strömsholm in 1968, the decision was made to form a foundation called the Stiftelsen Strömsholms Sportförening ("Foundation Strömsholms Sports Association") with responsibility for managing the officer corps' belongings. The foundation was reconstructed in 1988 to the current Strömsholms Ridsportförening ("Strömsholm Equestrian Association"). The riding school at Strömsholm was founded in 1968 and is today one of three national facilities in Sweden. It is owned by the Föreningen Ridskolan Strömsholm ("Riding School Strömsholm Association"), whose members are the Swedish Equestrian Federation and Aktiebolaget Trav och Galopp (ATG), as well as the Swedish Horse Industry Foundation (Hästnäringens Nationella Stiftelse, HNS). HNS is a foundation formed in 1992 by ATG and the Federation of Swedish Farmers, which has a financial and organizational responsibility for all national facilities. The others in addition to Ridskolan Strömsholm are Flyinge and Wången.

== Commanding officers ==
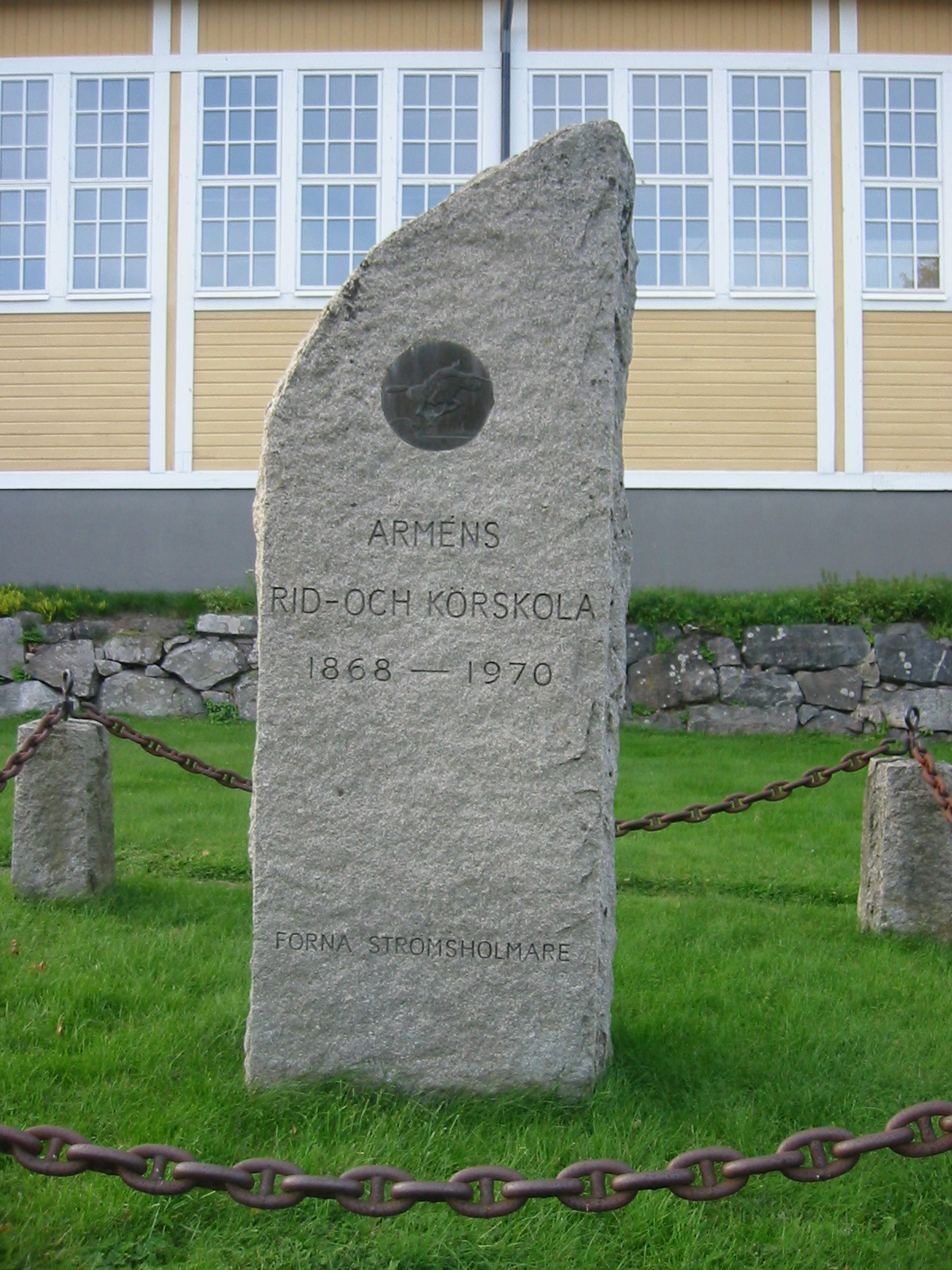
Memorial stone of the school.

- 1868–????: Waloddi Fischerström
- 1903–1906: Bengt Axel Eugène Ribbing
- 1906–1908: Philip Rickman von Platen
- 1908–1912: Gustaf Adolf Boltenstern
- 1912–1915: Ernst Linder
- 1915–1921: Nils Fischerström
- 1921–1925: Carl Emil Otto Trägårdh
- 1925–1930: Gustaf Hamilton
- 1930–1934: Knut Henrik Palmstierna
- 1934–1940: Sven Colliander
- 1940–1943: Henric Lagercrantz
- 1943–1953: Harald Strömfelt
- 1953–1959: Gustaf Nyblæus
- 1959–1964: Hans von Blixen-Finecke Jr.
- 1964–1968: Berthold Dieden

== Names, designations and locations ==
| Name | Translation | From | | To |
|---|---|---|---|---|
| Ridskolan | Riding School | 1868 | – | 1957 |
| Arméns rid- och körskola | [Swedish] Army Riding and Horse-Driving School [Swedish] Army Riding and Driver Training School | 1957 | – | 1970 |
| Designation | | From | | To |
| RS | | 1868 | – | 1970 |
| Location | | From | | To |
| Strömsholm Palace | | 1868 | – | 1970 |
