= Ryttmästare =

Swedish Army cavalry rank

- Country: Sweden
- Service branch: Army
- Rank: Captain
- NATO rank code: OF-2
- Formation: 16th century
- Abolished: 1972
- Next higher rank: Major
- Next lower rank: Lieutenant
- Equivalent ranks: Captain

Ryttmästare (from the German word Rittmeister) was a military rank in the Swedish cavalry in the Swedish Army. The rank corresponded to the rank of captain in other service branches. The rank was abolished in 1972.

== History ==
The military rank of ryttmästare as a designation for the rank of captain had been used since the 16th century. The name was then used for the commander of a company of riders (several of them were usually part of a squadron). Ryttmästare later became squadron commander. Since the 17th century it was the title for a company officer of the highest rank in the Swedish cavalry with position between lieutenant and major (corresponding to the rank of captain in other branches). A 1967 inquiry (Tjänsteställningsutredningen 1967) considered that the position of ryttmästare as a designation for the rank of captain in the cavalry should be retained as long as the cavalry remained as a service branch in the organization. The rank was abolished after a reform in 1972 (Tjänsteställningsreformen 1972).

== Uniform ==
=== Field uniform model 1958/1959 – rank structure of 1949 ===
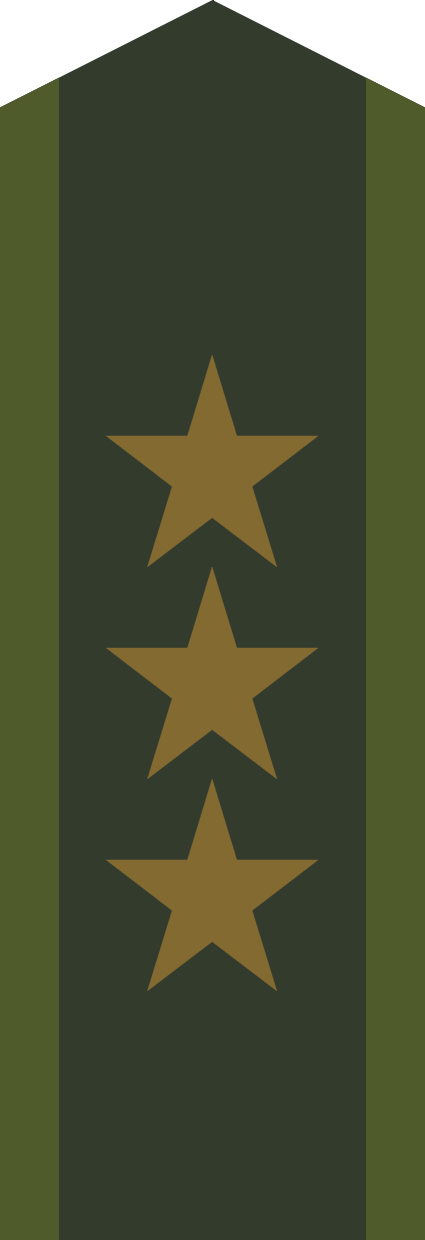
Collar patch m/58

=== Uniform model 1939 – rank structure of 1949 ===
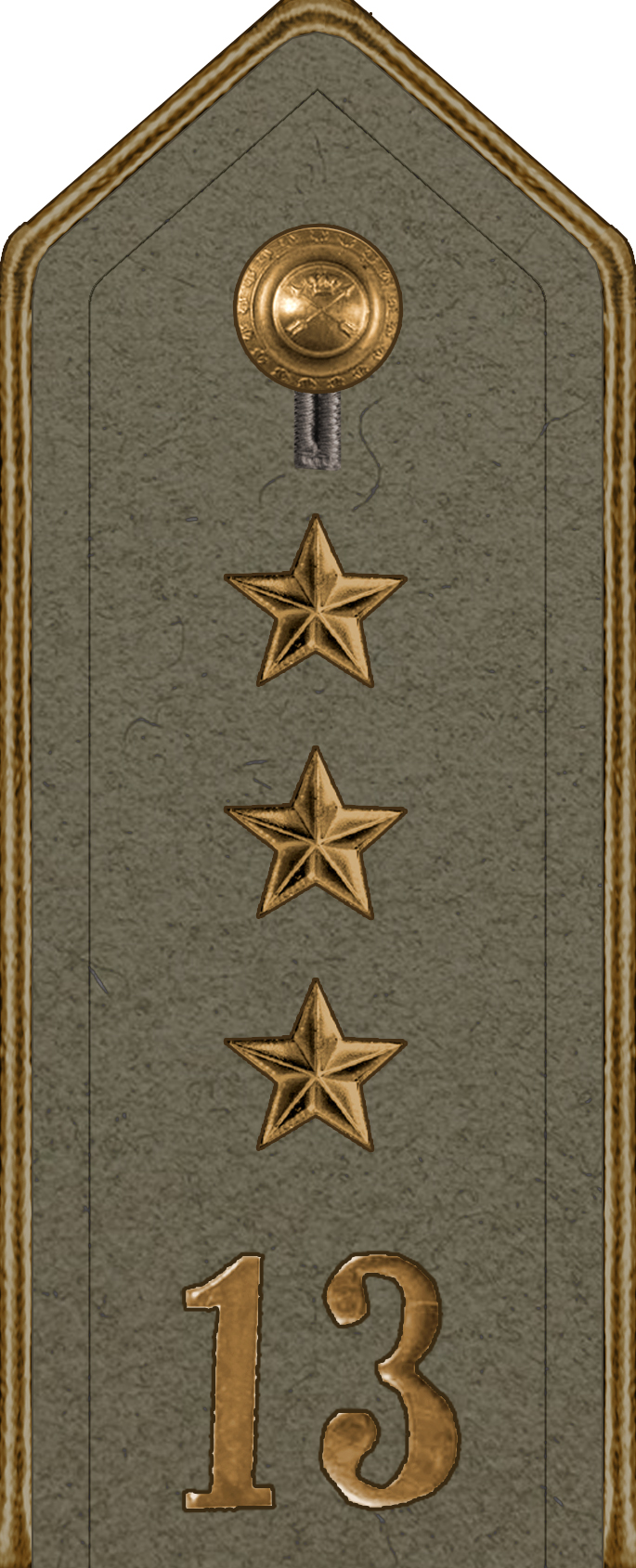
Shoulder mark m/39

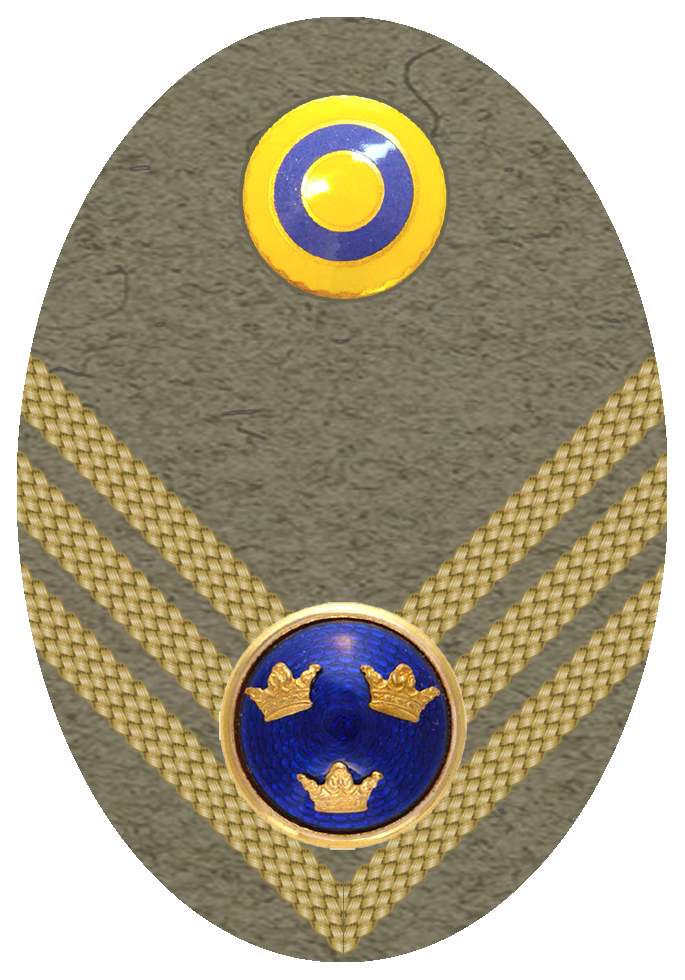
Badge m/46 to field cap

=== Uniform model 1939 ===
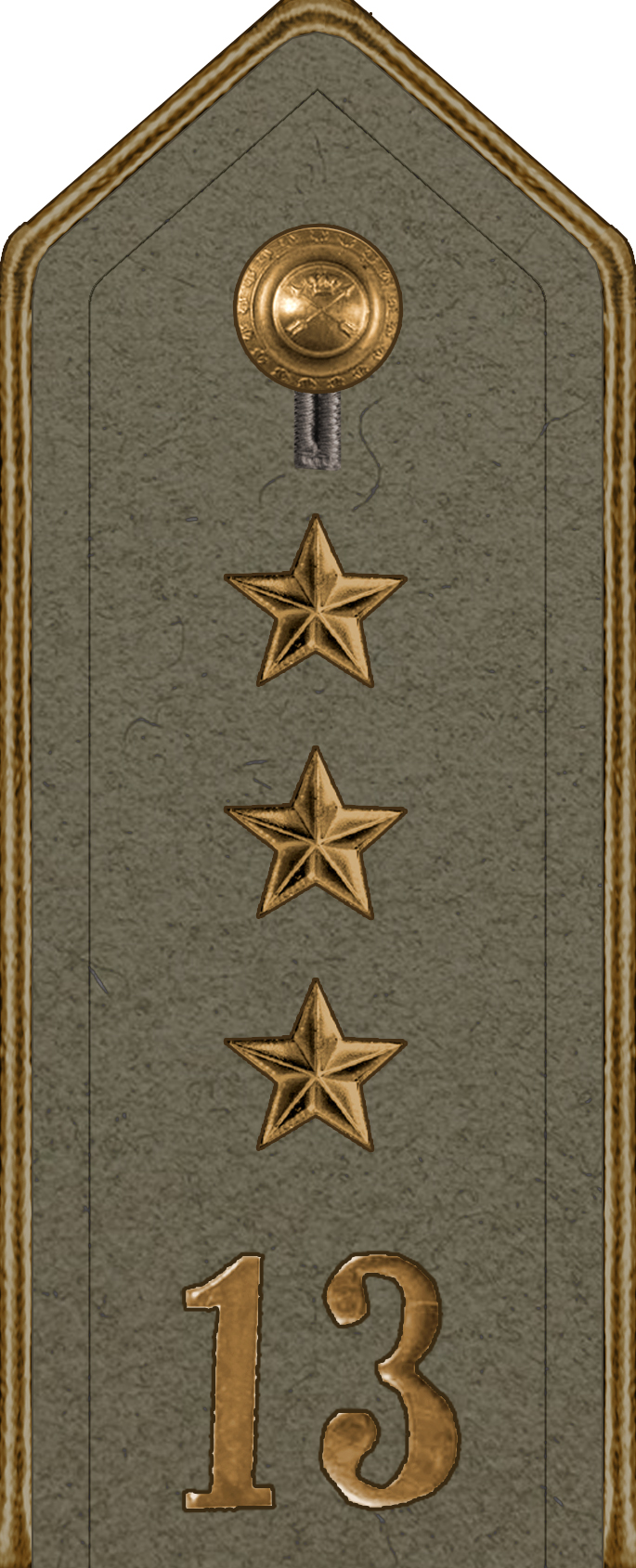
Shoulder mark m/39

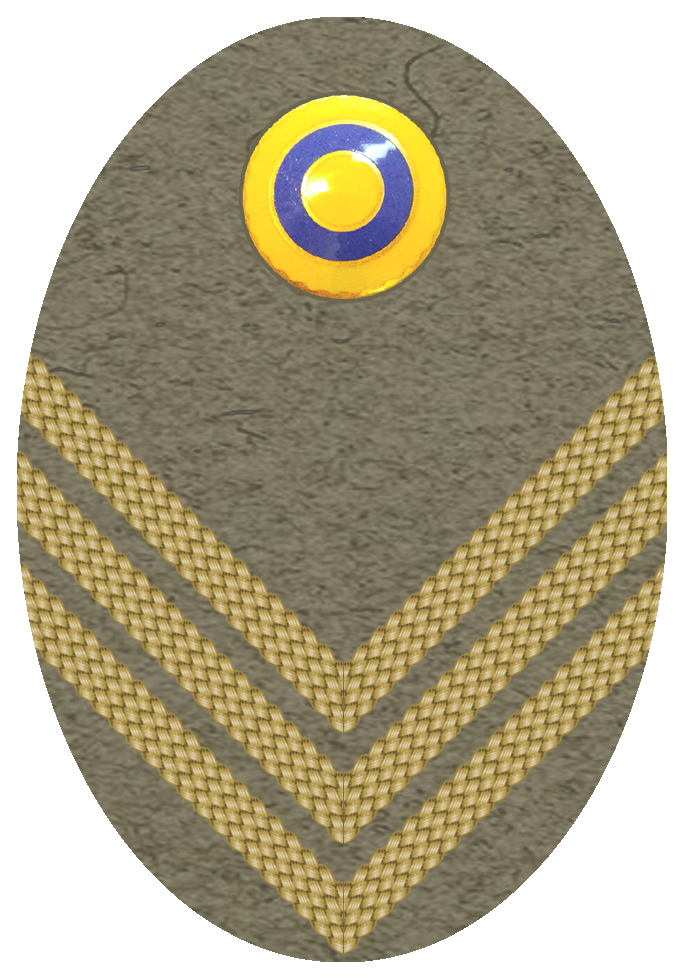
Badge m/40 to field cap

=== Uniform model 1923 ===
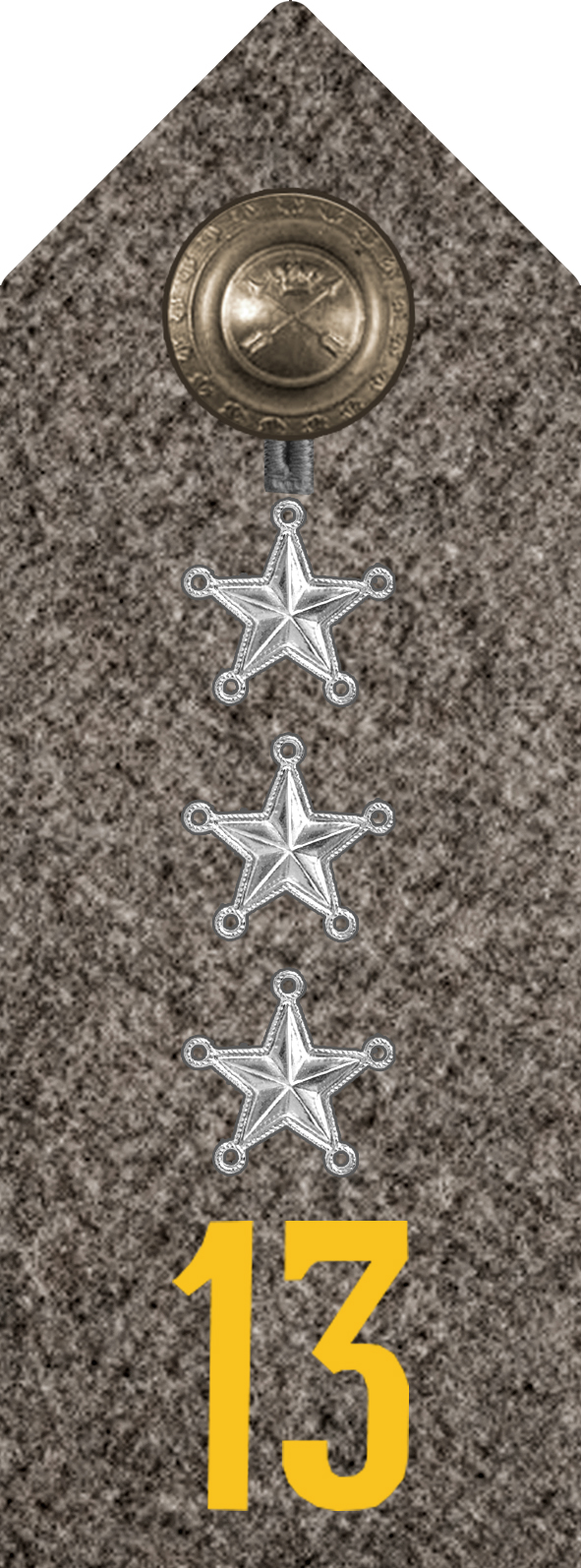
Shoulder mark on greatcoat

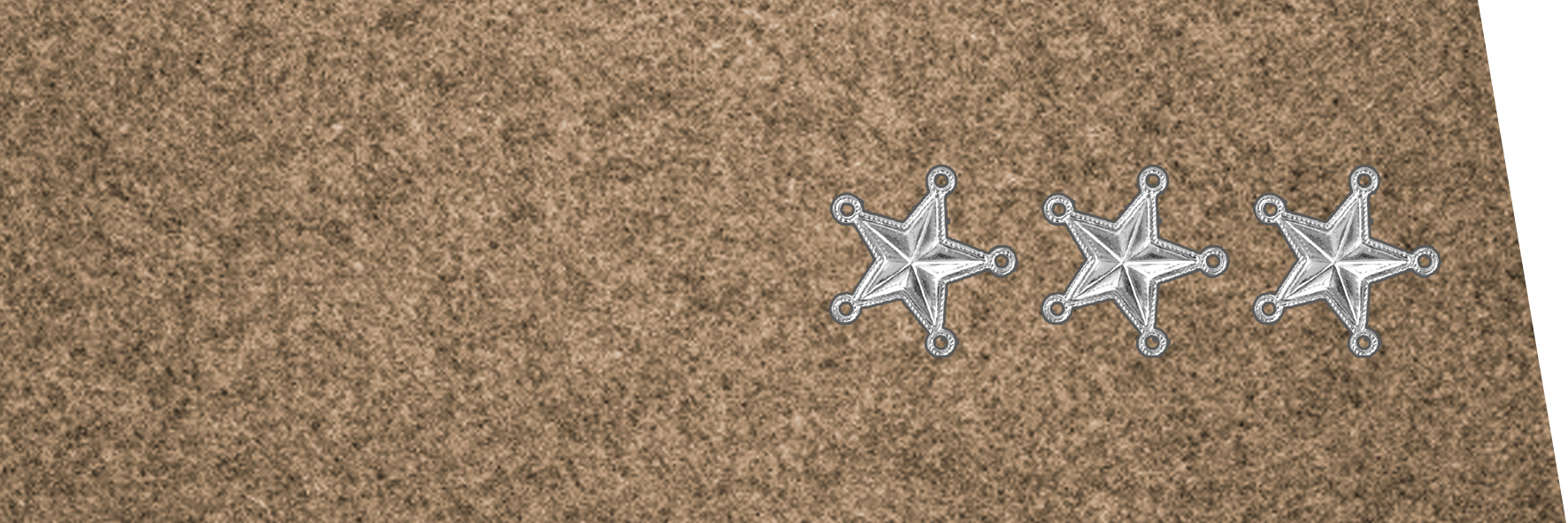
Collar patch

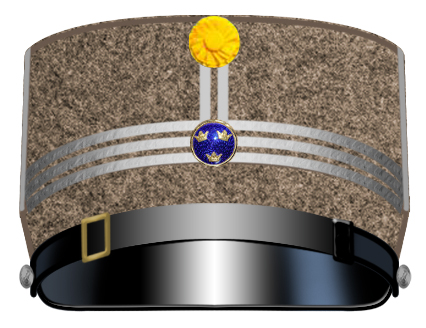
Cap m/23

=== Uniform model 1910 ===
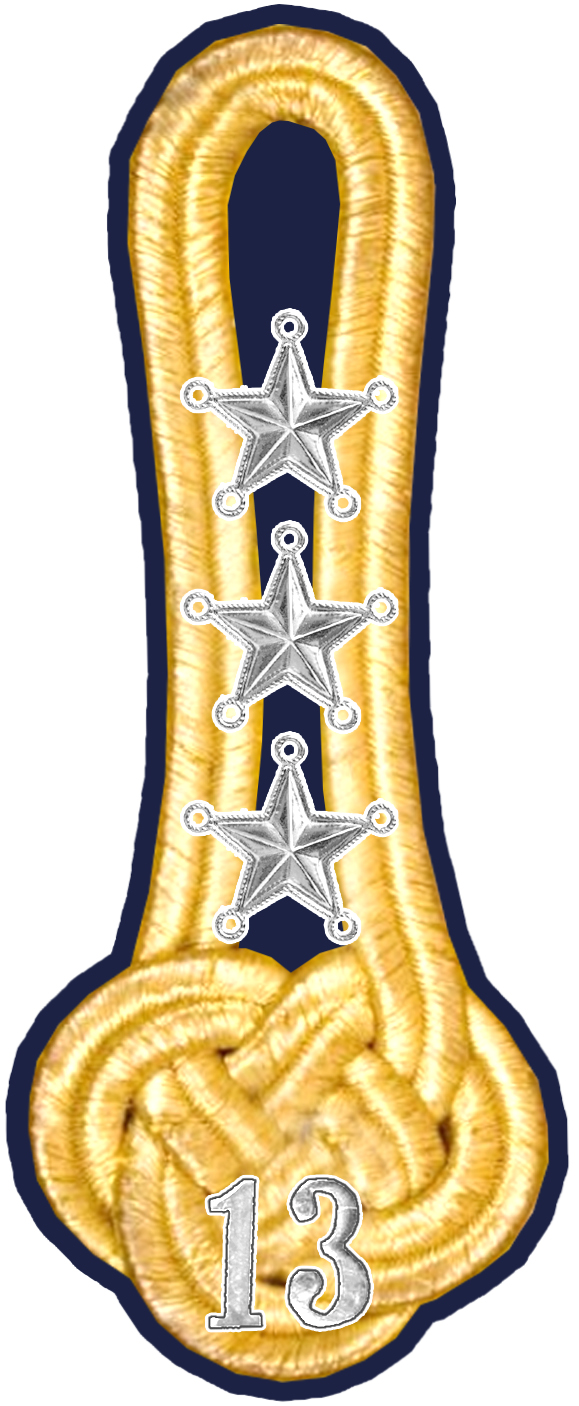
Shoulder mark m/10

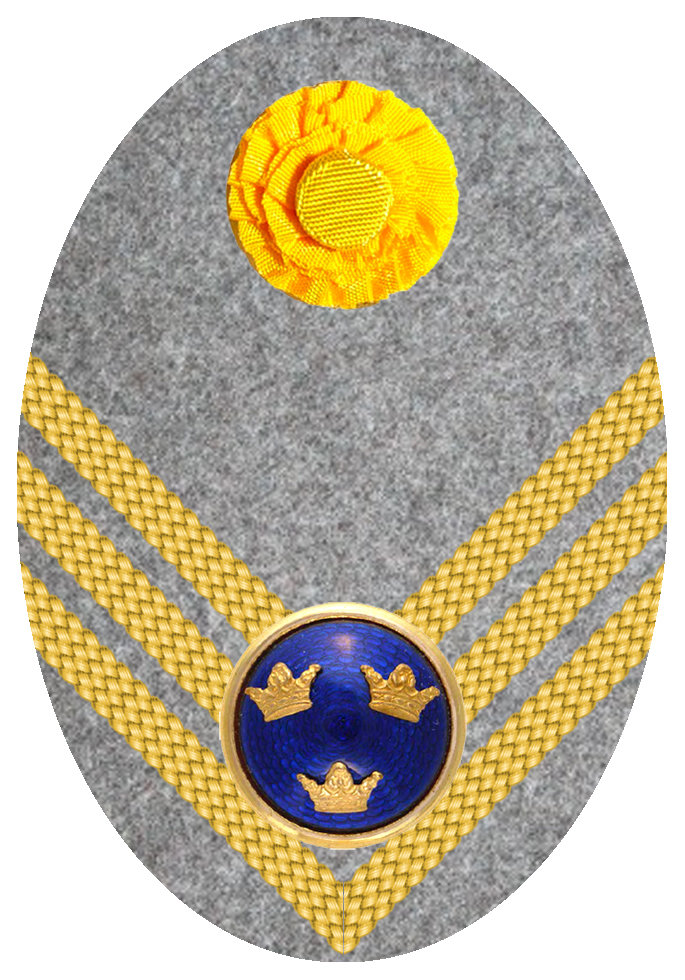
Badge m/14 for fur cap

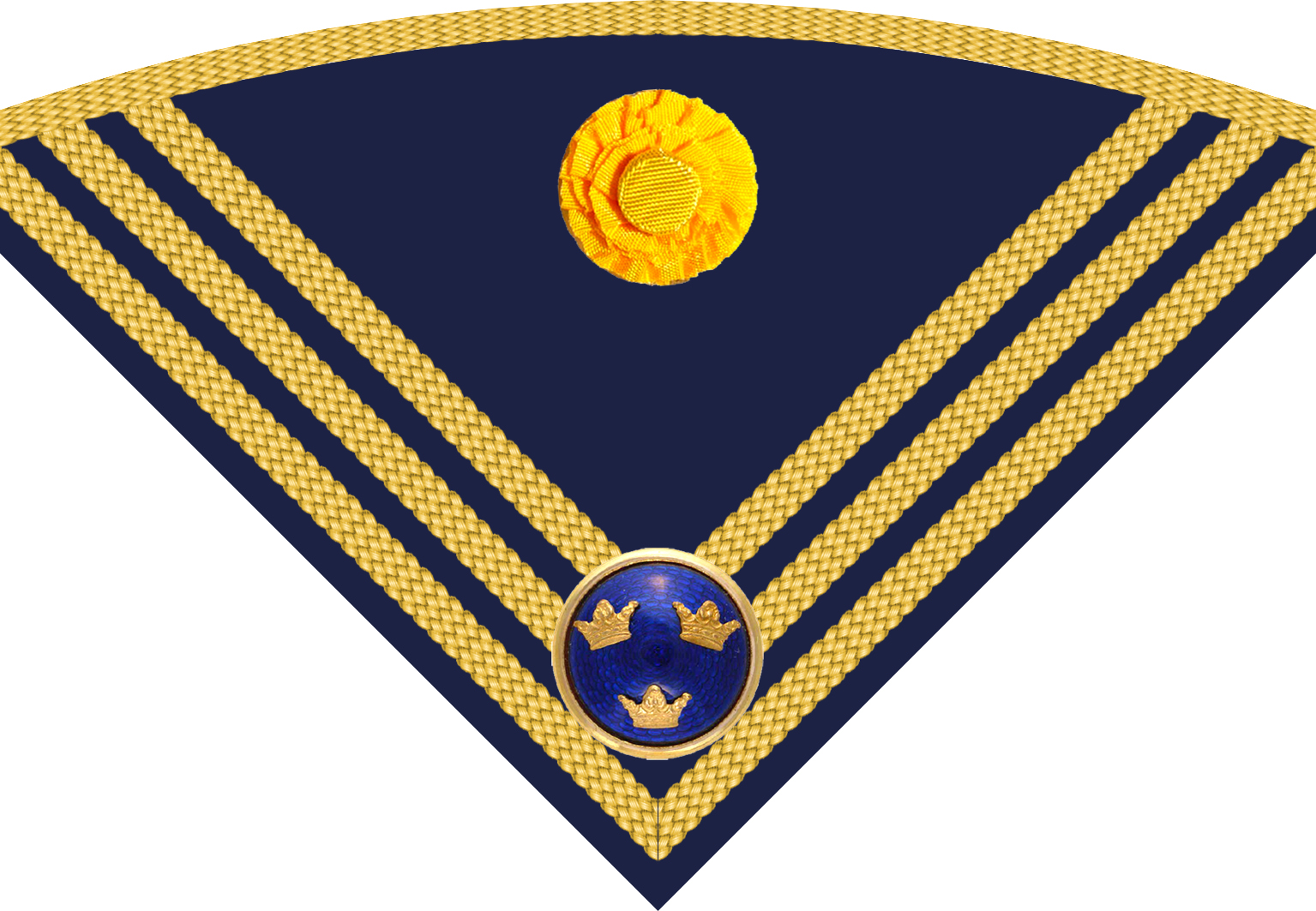
Badge m/10-14 for hat

=== Uniform model 1906 ===
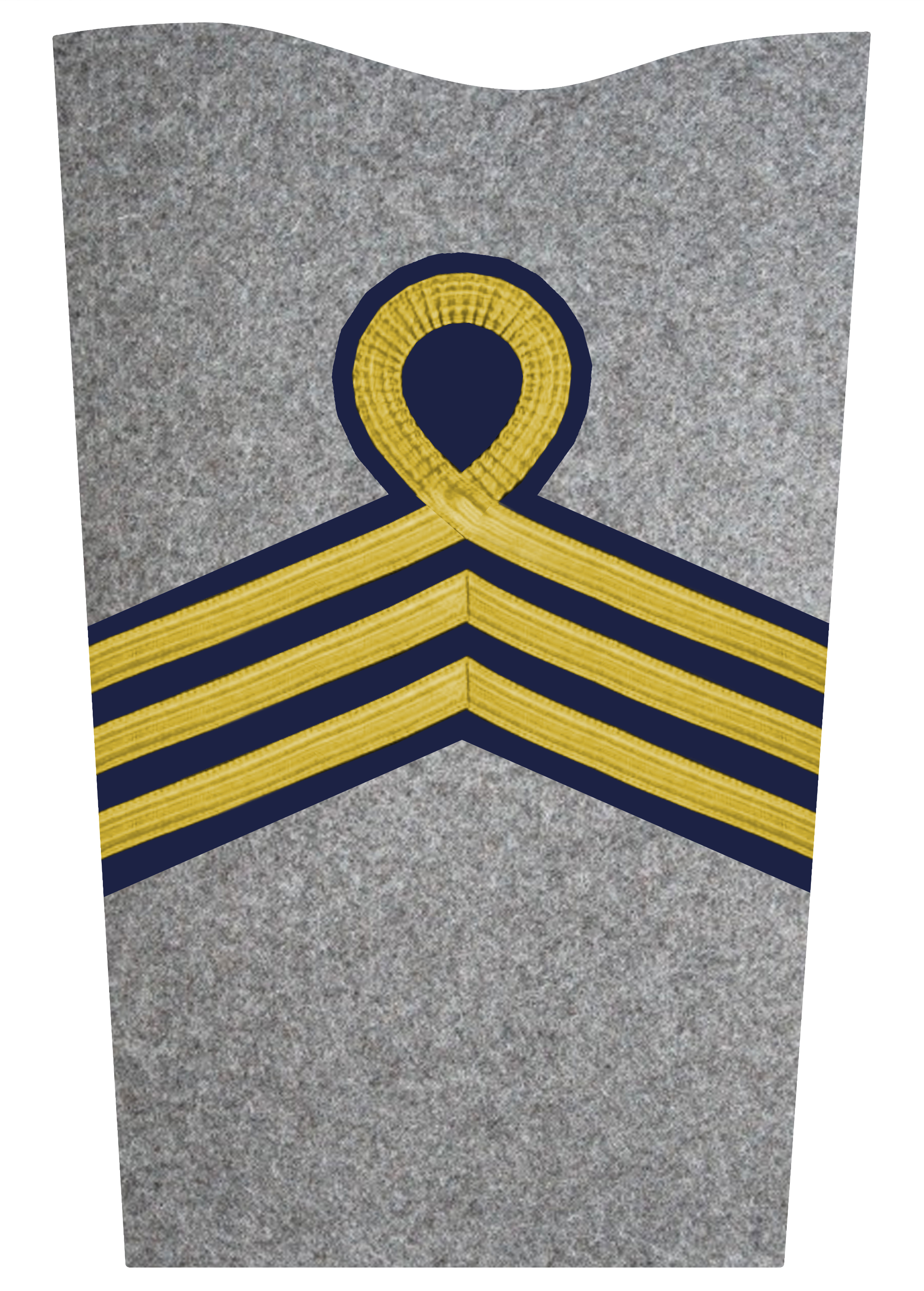
Sleeve insignia m/1906

=== Other ===
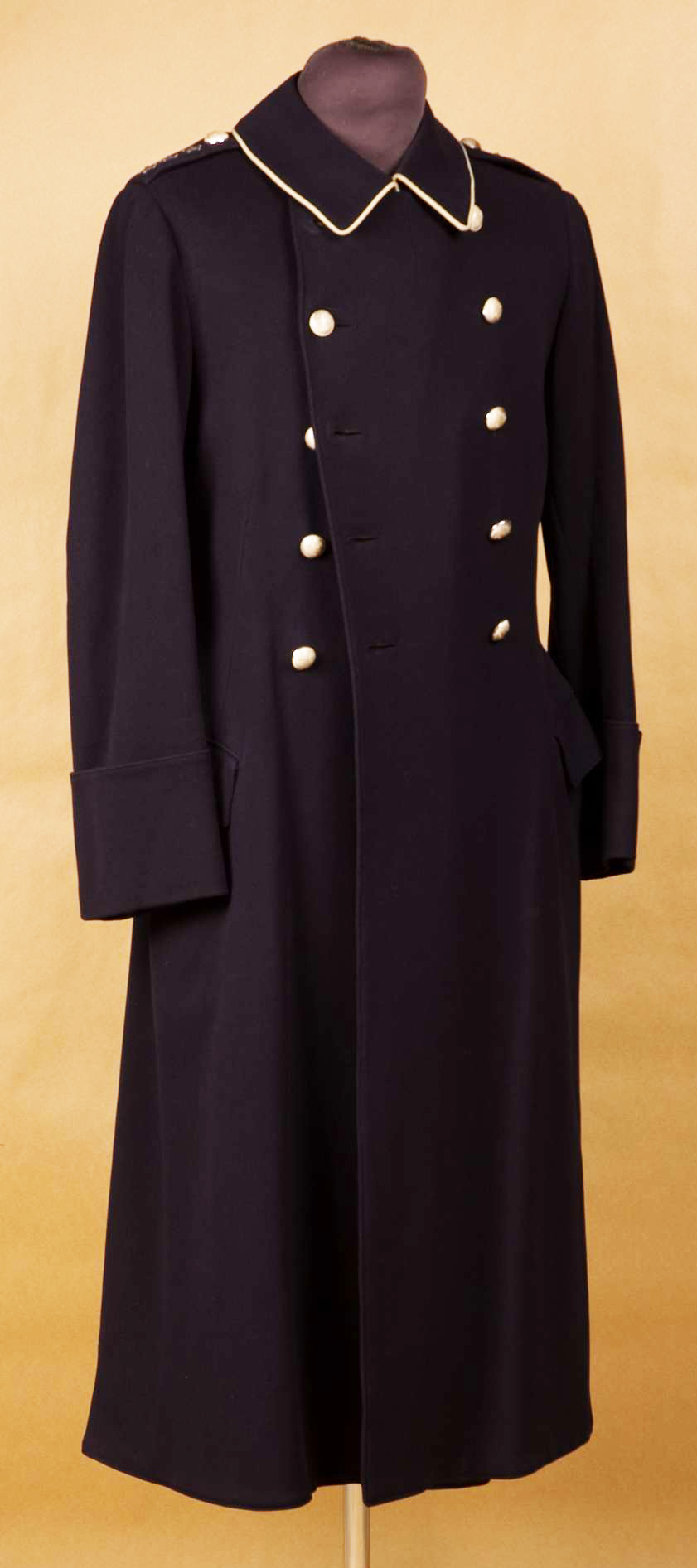
Coat m/1872 for a ryttmästare in the Life Guards of Horse (K 1).

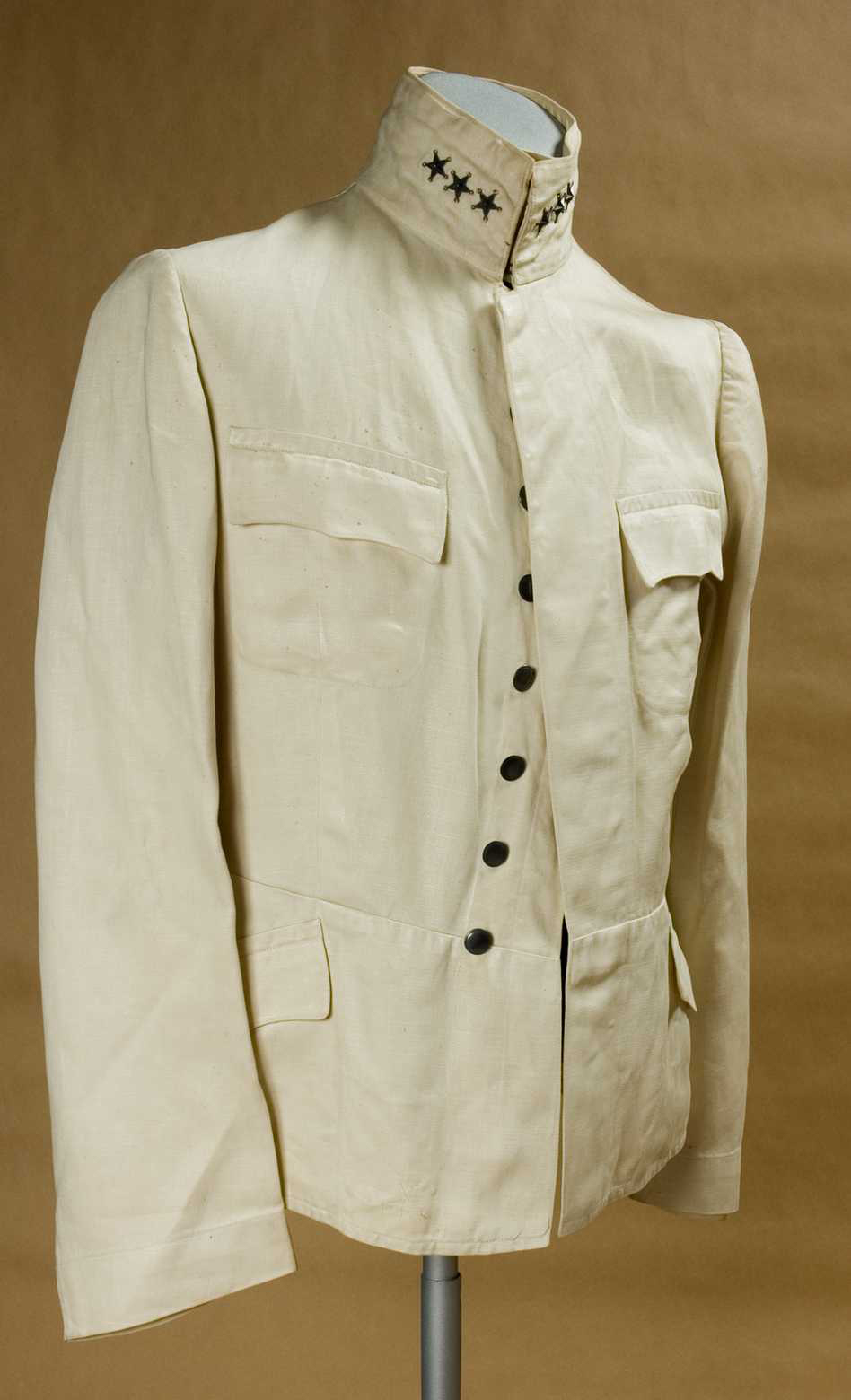
Kollett m/1871 for a ryttmästare in the Life Guards of Horse (K 1).

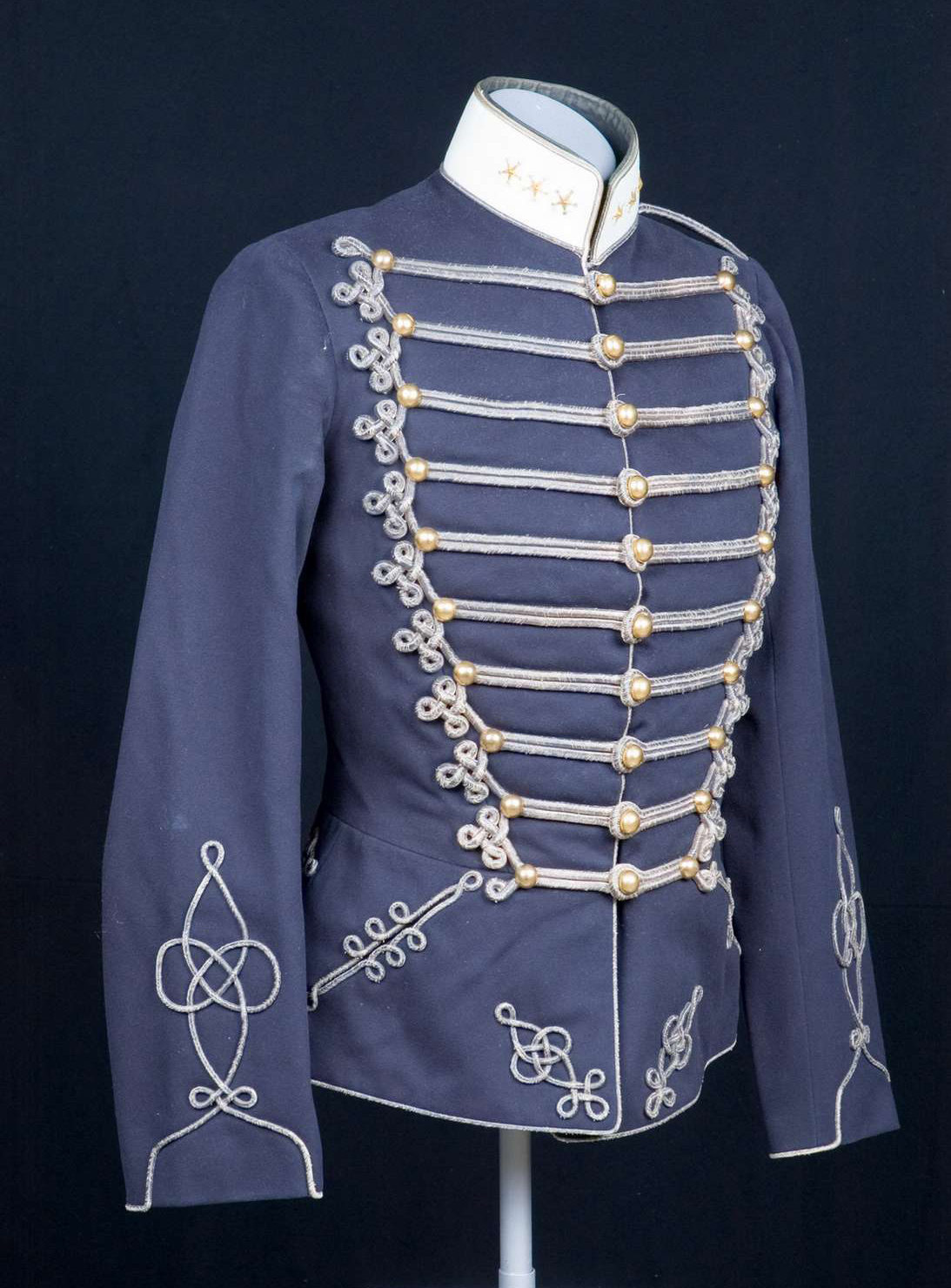
Dolman m/1895 for a ryttmästare in the Life Regiment Hussars (K 3).
