= Military ranks of the Swedish Armed Forces =

Military ranks of the Swedish Armed Forces shows the rank system used in the Swedish Armed Forces today, as well as changes during the 20th century due to changes in the personnel structure.

== Current ranks ==
On 1 October 2019, the Swedish Armed Forces introduced a new rank structure that differs from those used by most armed forces worldwide. In the Swedish system, non-commissioned officers (NCOs) cannot advance beyond the rank of OR-5 without completing a shortened version of Officer Candidate School tailored to their specific field. Upon graduation, they are commissioned as officers with the same status as regular officers. To indicate their specialization in a technical field, they are designated as Specialist Officers. The Specialist Officer corps forms a parallel pay grade structure alongside that of regular officers. Although specialist officers are sometimes compared to U.S. warrant officers due to their predominantly technical roles, the analogy is imperfect, as the highest specialist officer rank is equivalent to a lieutenant colonel. The ranks are divided into three categories: officers (OF-1 to OF-9), specialist officers (OR-6 to OR-9), and section commanders, soldiers, and sailors—collectively known in Swedish as GSS (OR-1 to OR-5). There is ongoing debate within the Swedish Armed Forces regarding the NATO designation of specialist officers.

The rank insignia shown below are those worn on the field uniform. Titles for the army, navy, and air force are also provided.

From 2023, the rank of Överfanjunkare has been introduced in the Swedish Armed Forces.

=== Commissioned officer ranks ===
The rank insignia of commissioned officers.

NATO code	OF-10	OF-9	OF-8	OF-7	OF-6	OF-5	OF-4	OF-3	OF-2	OF-1
Field uniform
Swedish Army
Swedish Army		General	Generallöjtnant	Generalmajor	Brigadgeneral	Överste	Överstelöjtnant	Major	Kapten	Löjtnant	Fänrik
Swedish Navy
Swedish Navy		Amiral	Viceamiral	Konteramiral	Flottiljamiral	Kommendör	Kommendörkapten	Örlogskapten	Kapten	Löjtnant	Fänrik
(Sweden) Swedish Amphibious Corps
(Sweden) Swedish Amphibious Corps		General	Generallöjtnant	Generalmajor	Brigadgeneral	Överste	Överstelöjtnant	Major	Kapten	Löjtnant	Fänrik
Swedish Air Force
Swedish Air Force		General	Generallöjtnant	Generalmajor	Brigadgeneral	Överste	Överstelöjtnant	Major	Kapten	Löjtnant	Fänrik
NATO code	OF-10	OF-9	OF-8	OF-7	OF-6	OF-5	OF-4	OF-3	OF-2	OF-1

=== Student officer ranks ===
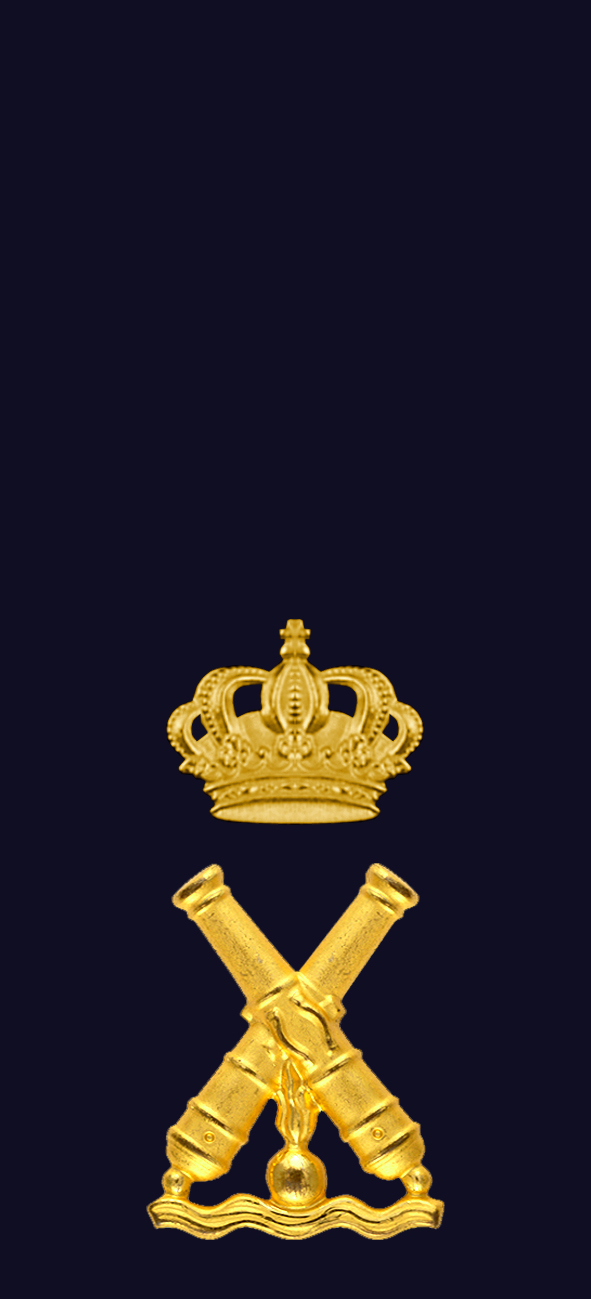
NATO code	OR-5
Field uniform
Swedish Army
Swedish Navy
(Sweden) Swedish Amphibious Corps
Swedish Air Force
Name	Kadett

==== Other ranks ====
The rank insignia of specialist officers (OR6 - OR9) and enlisted personnel (OR1 - OR5).

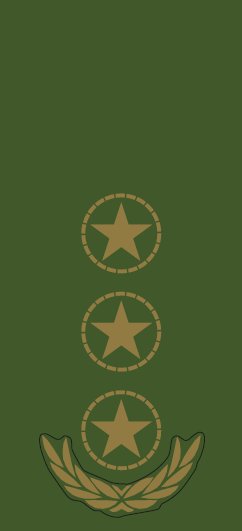
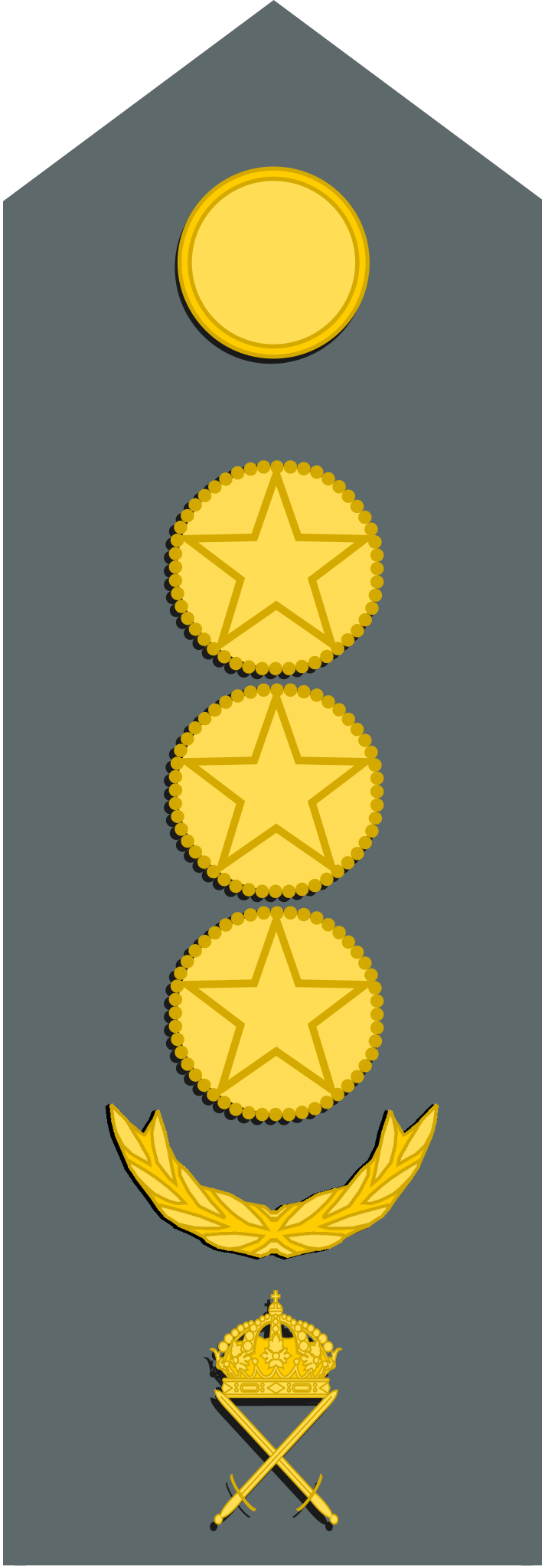
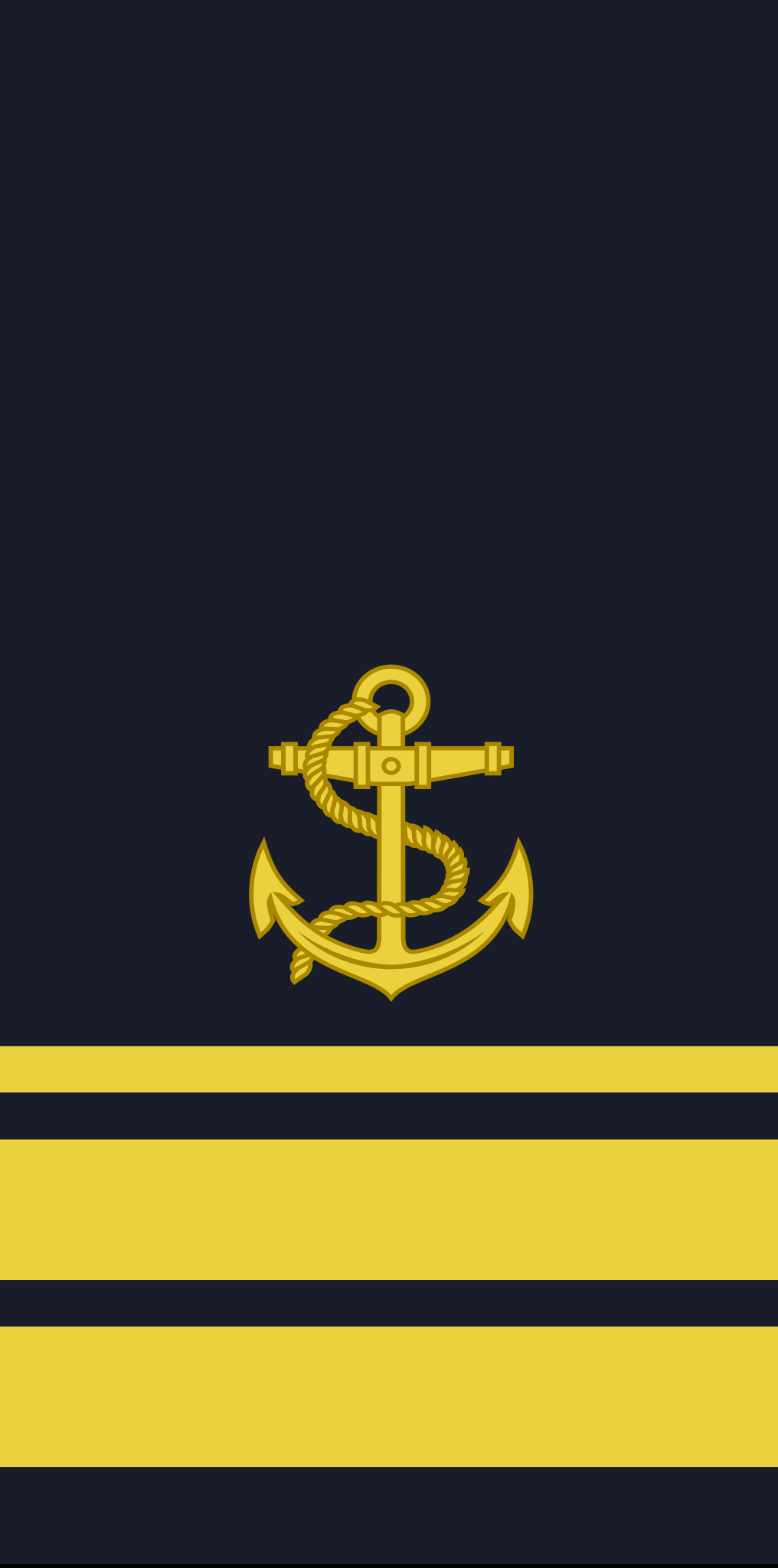
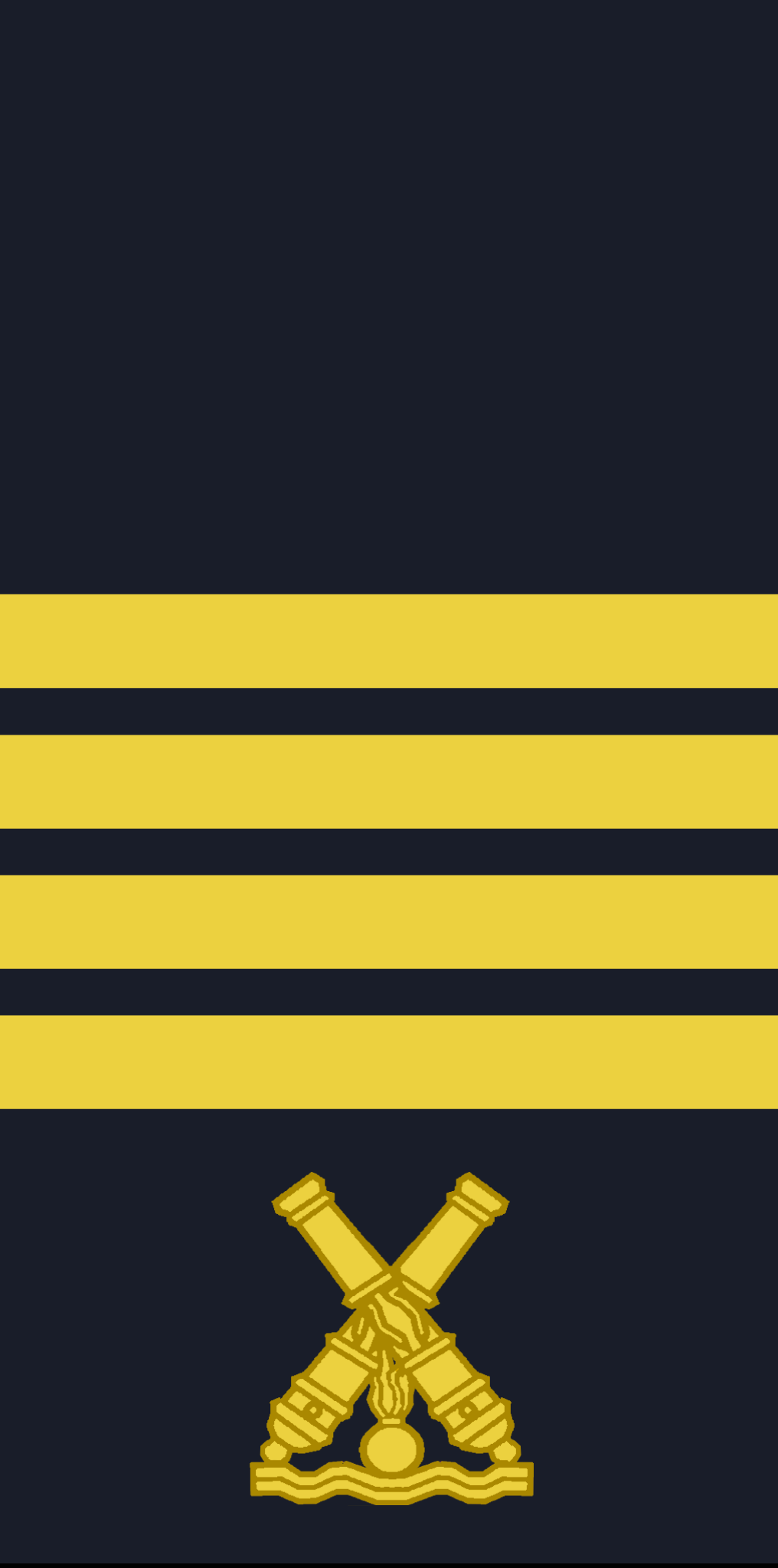
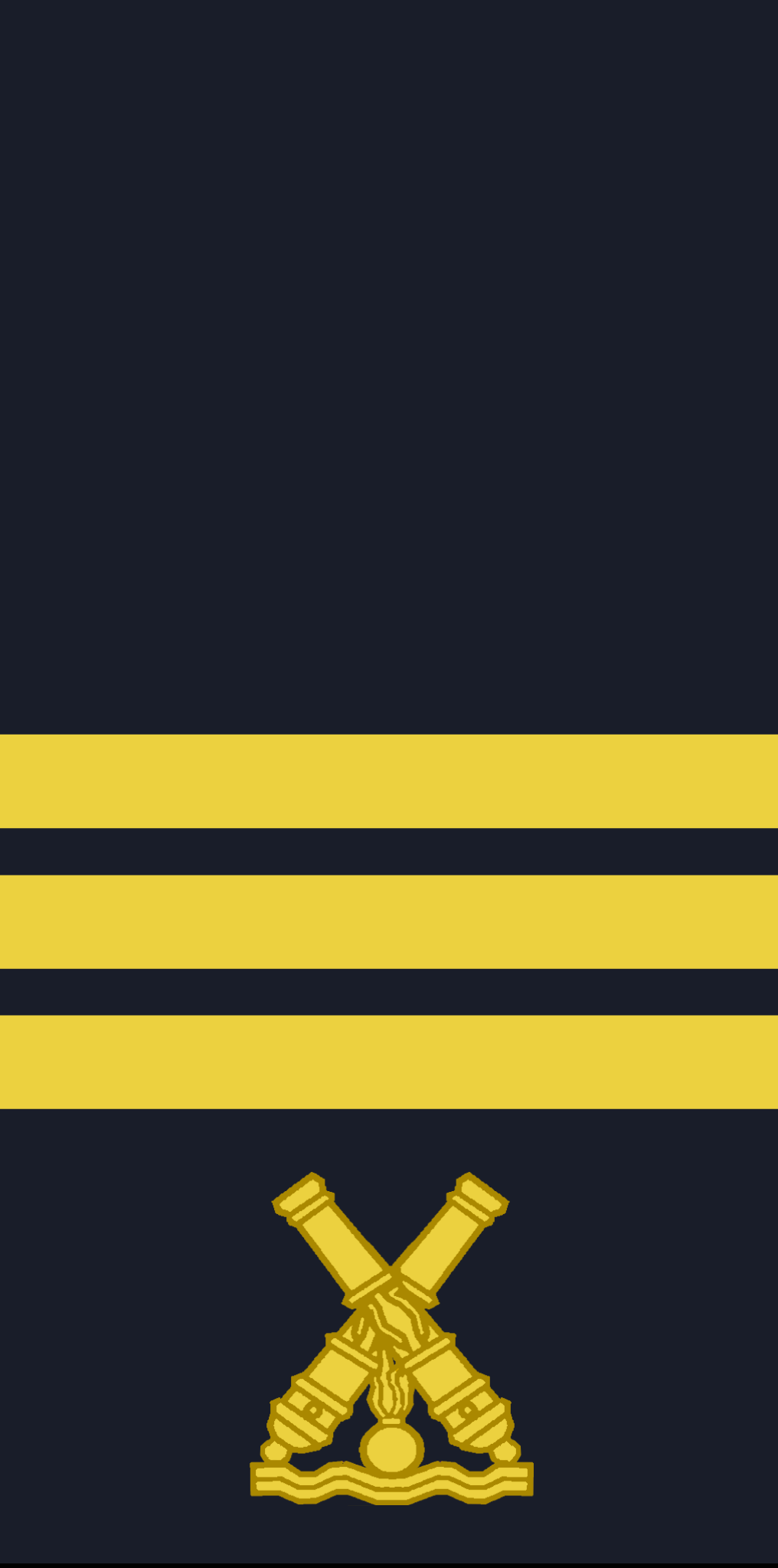
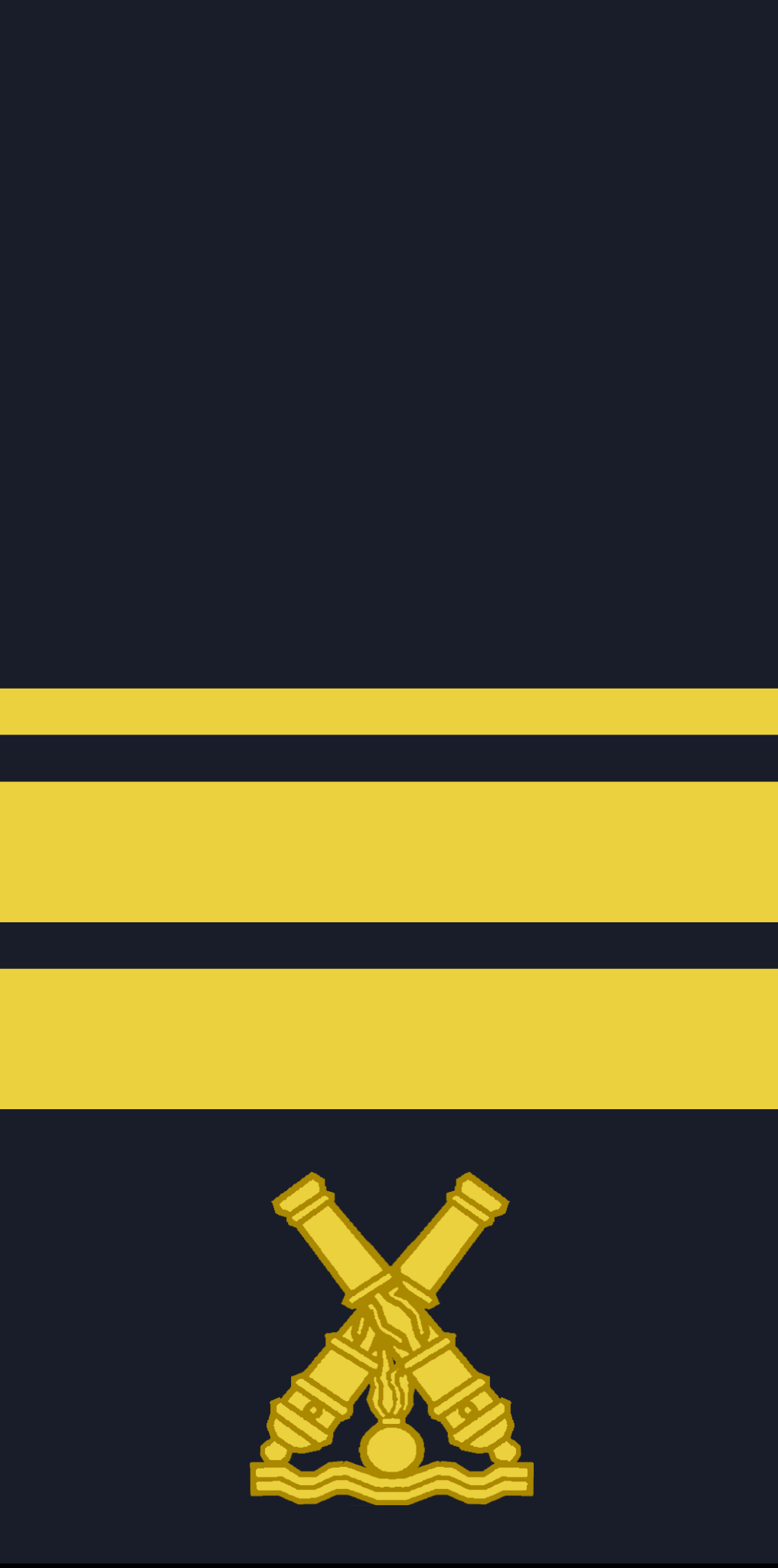
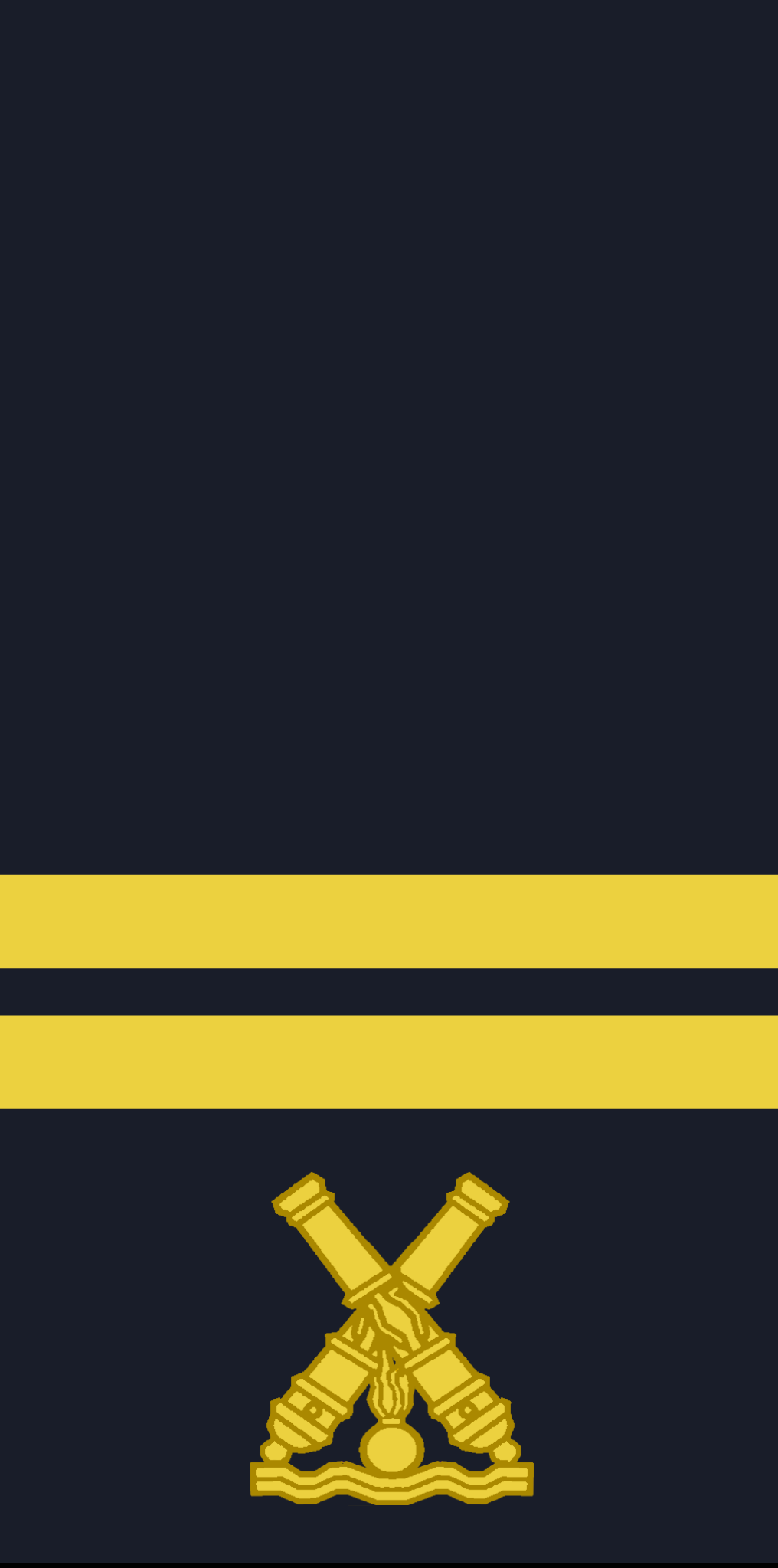
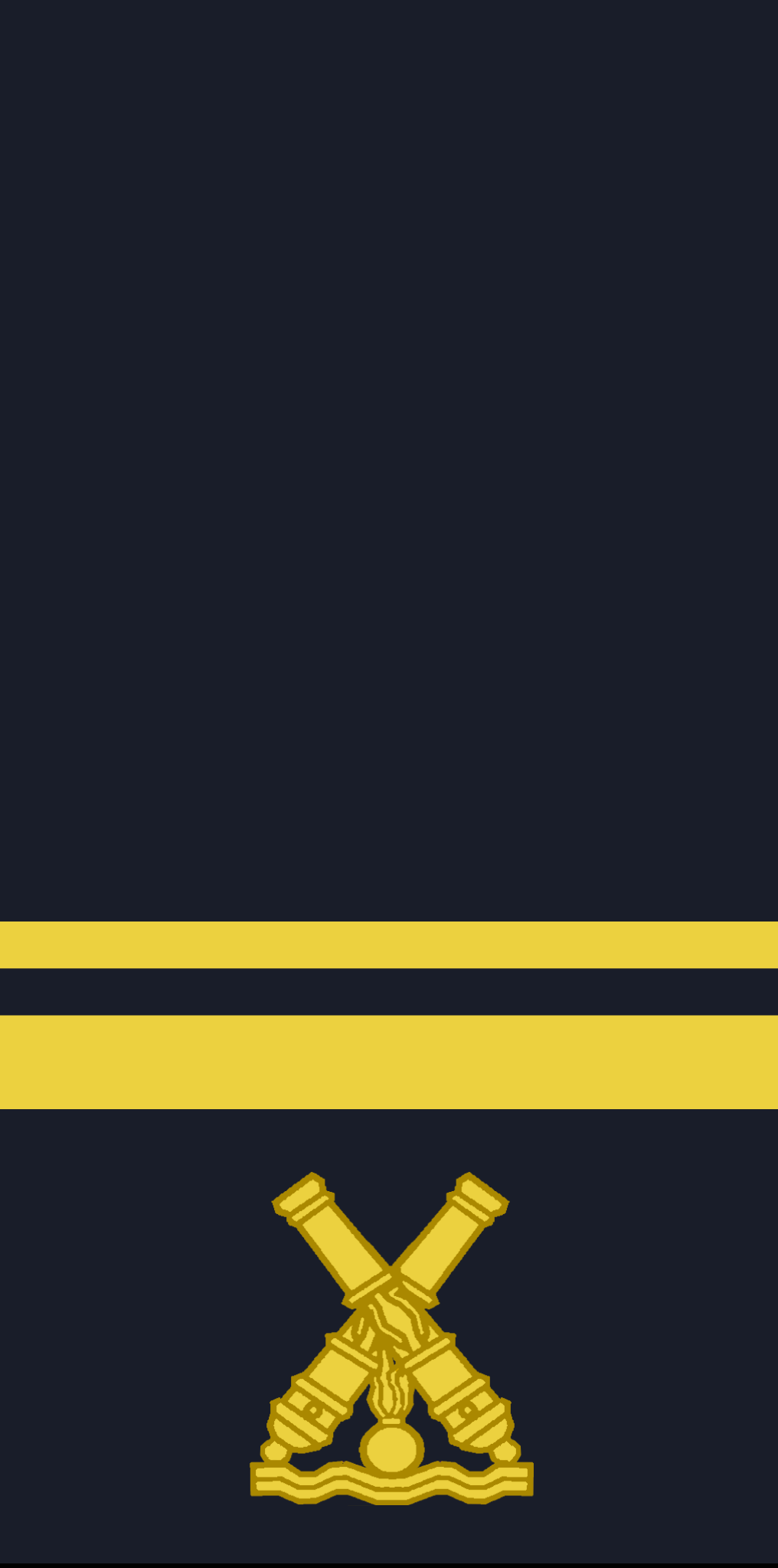
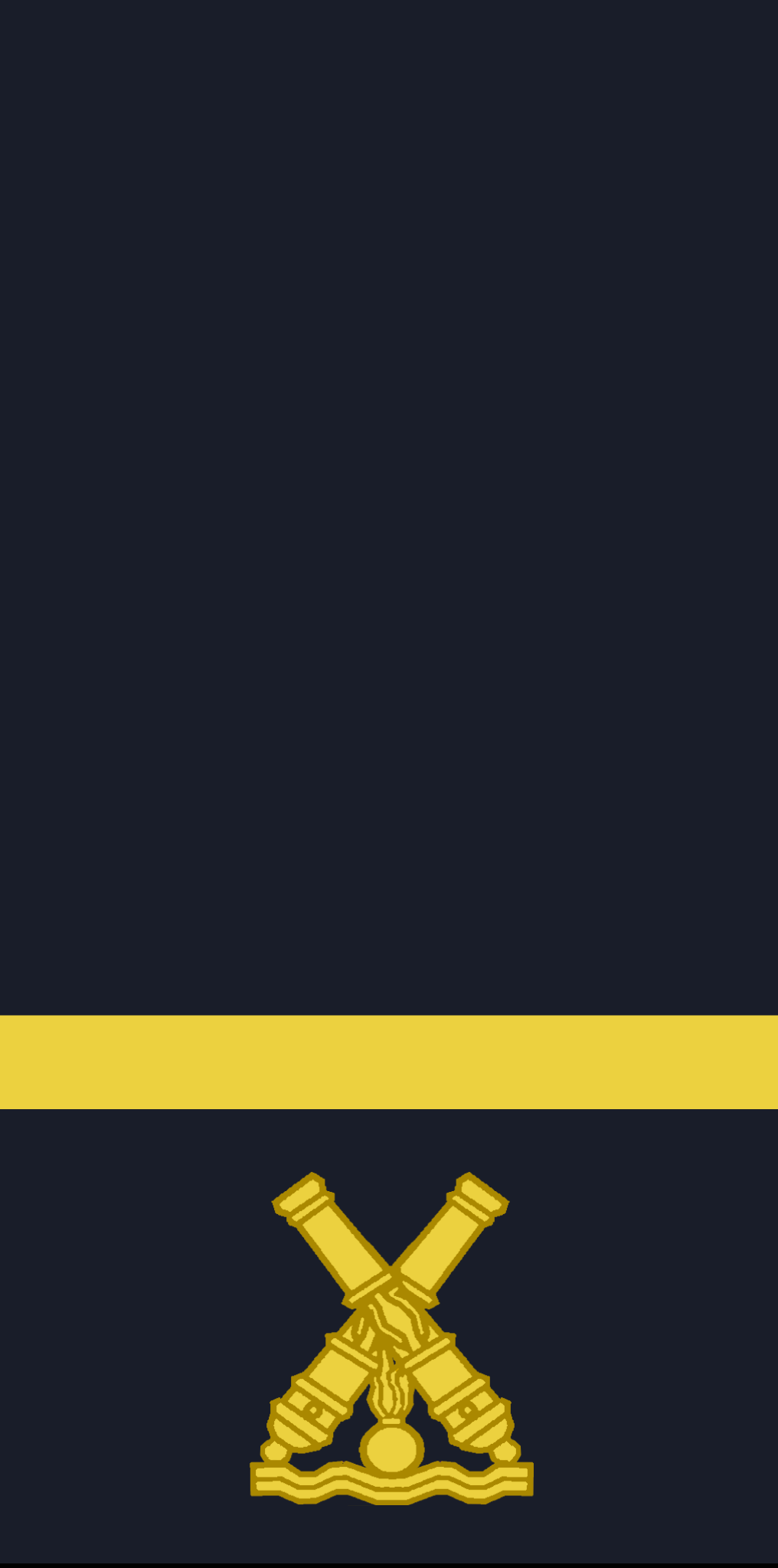
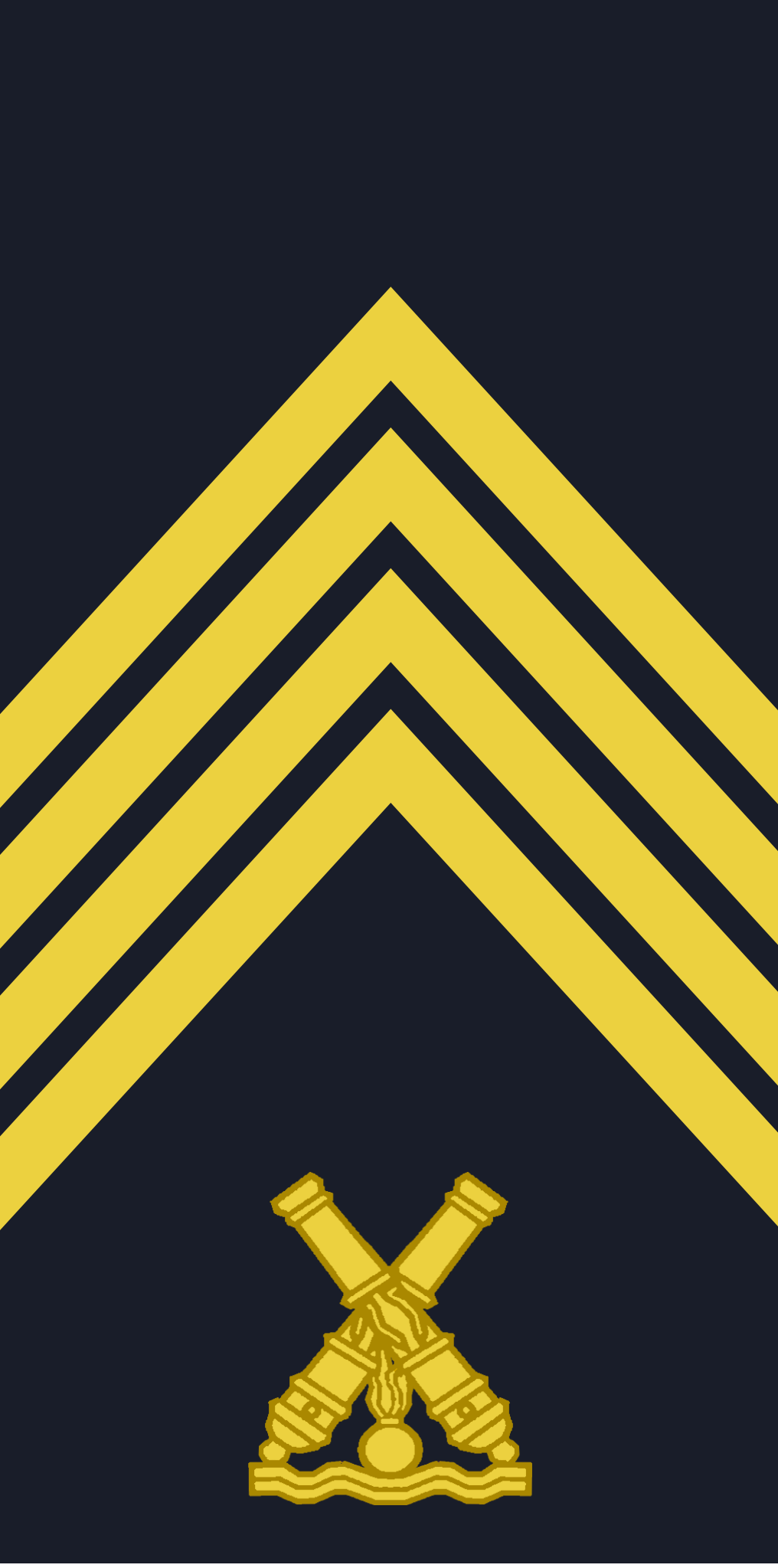
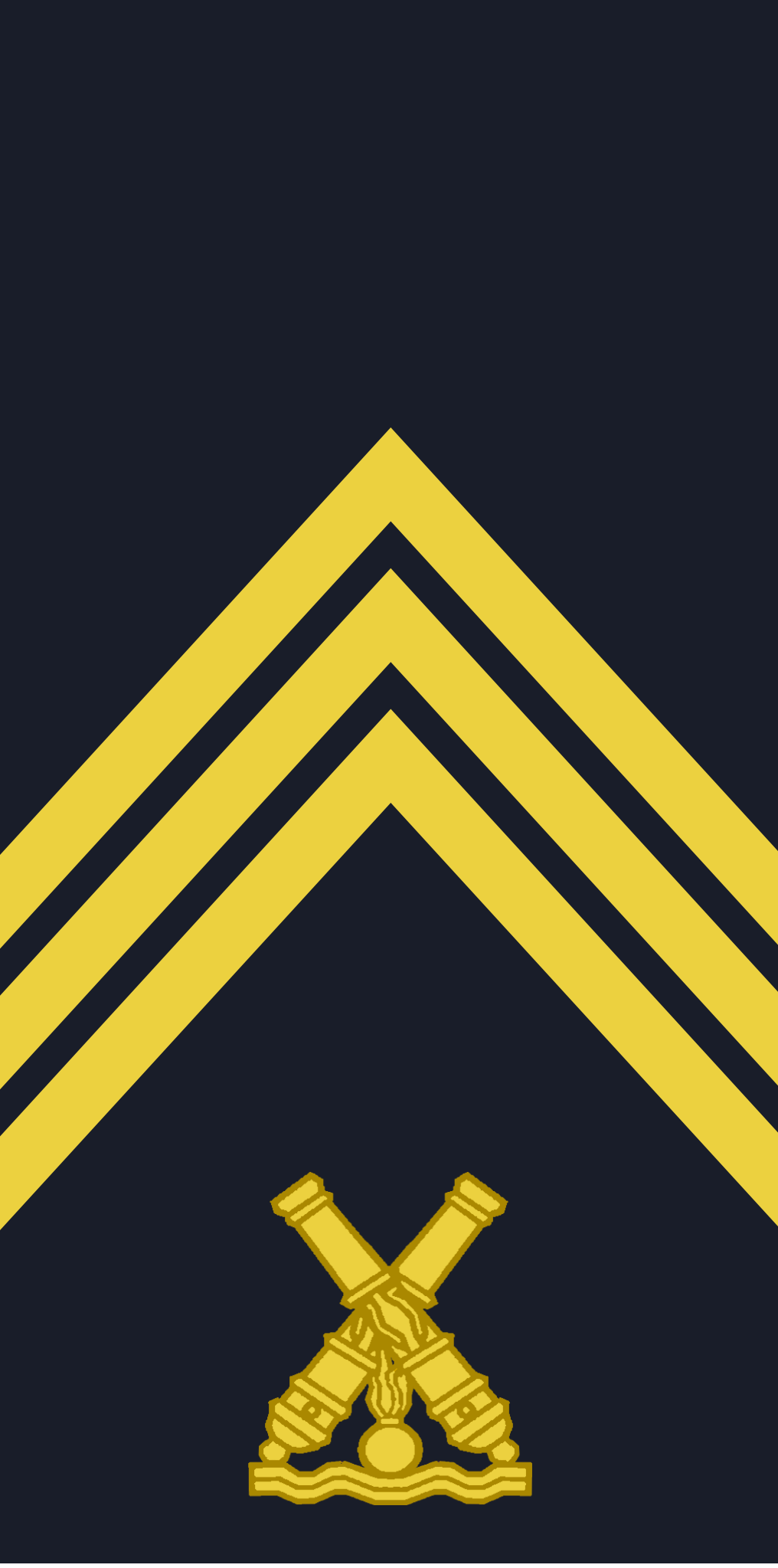
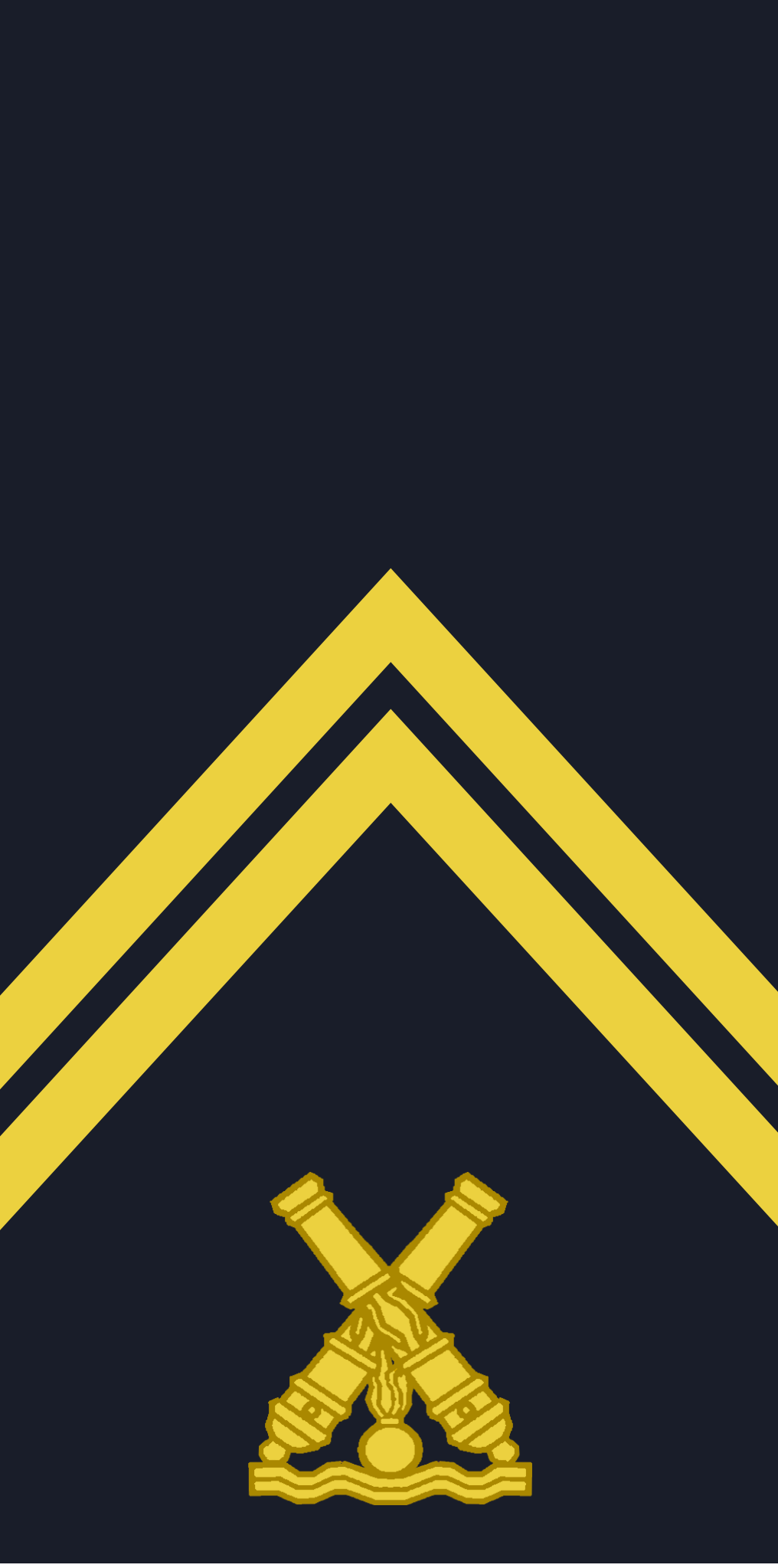
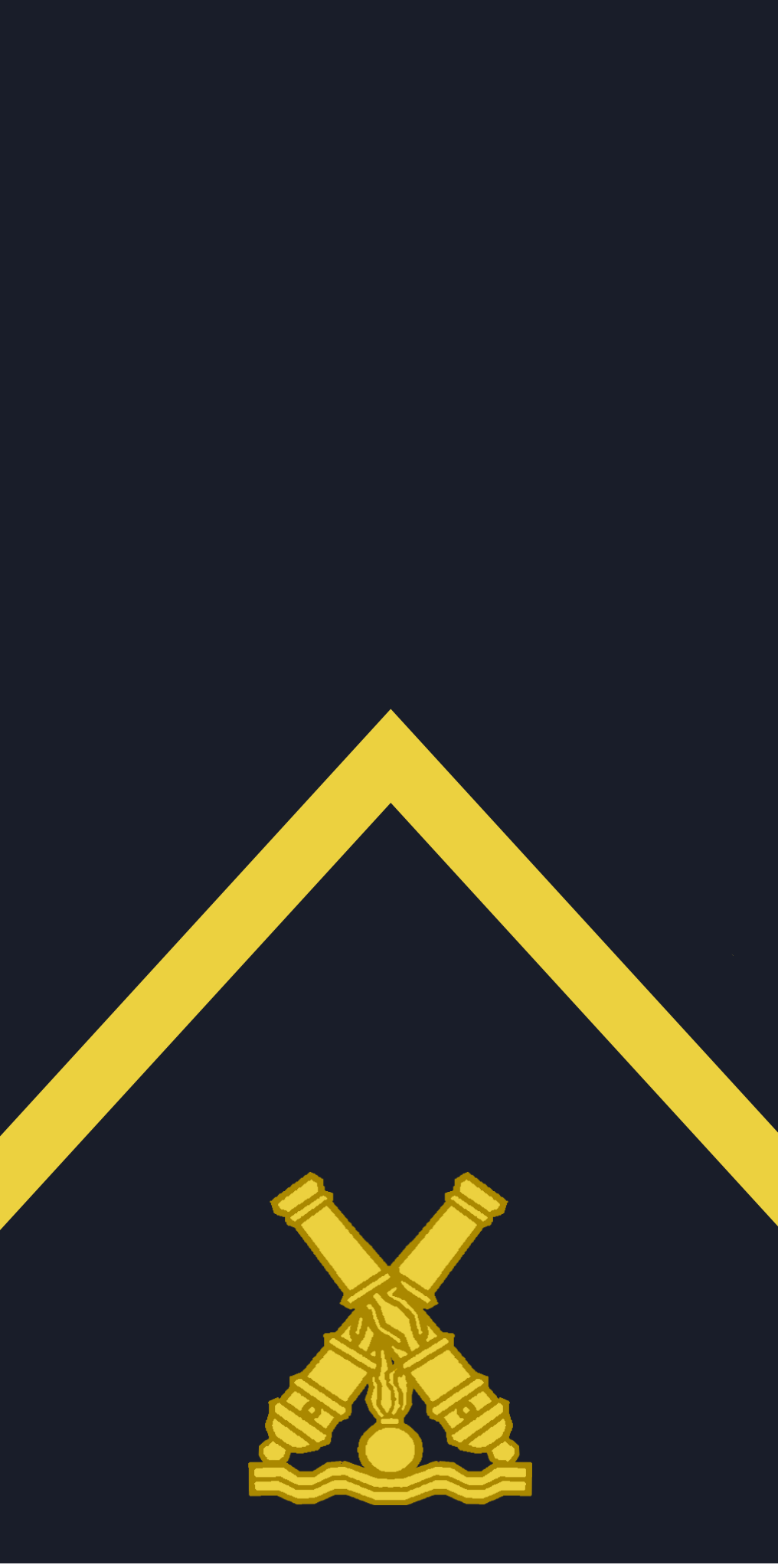
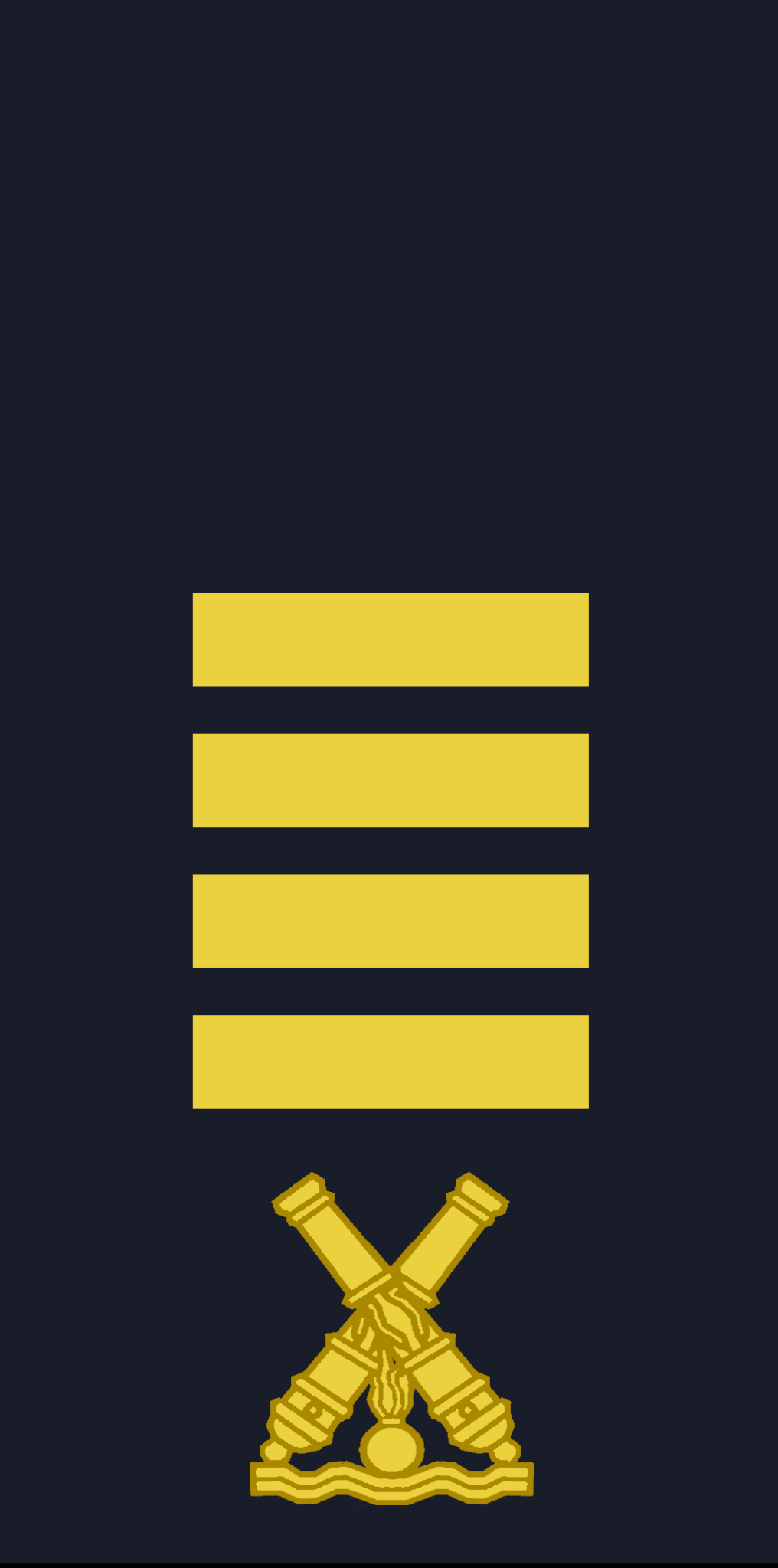
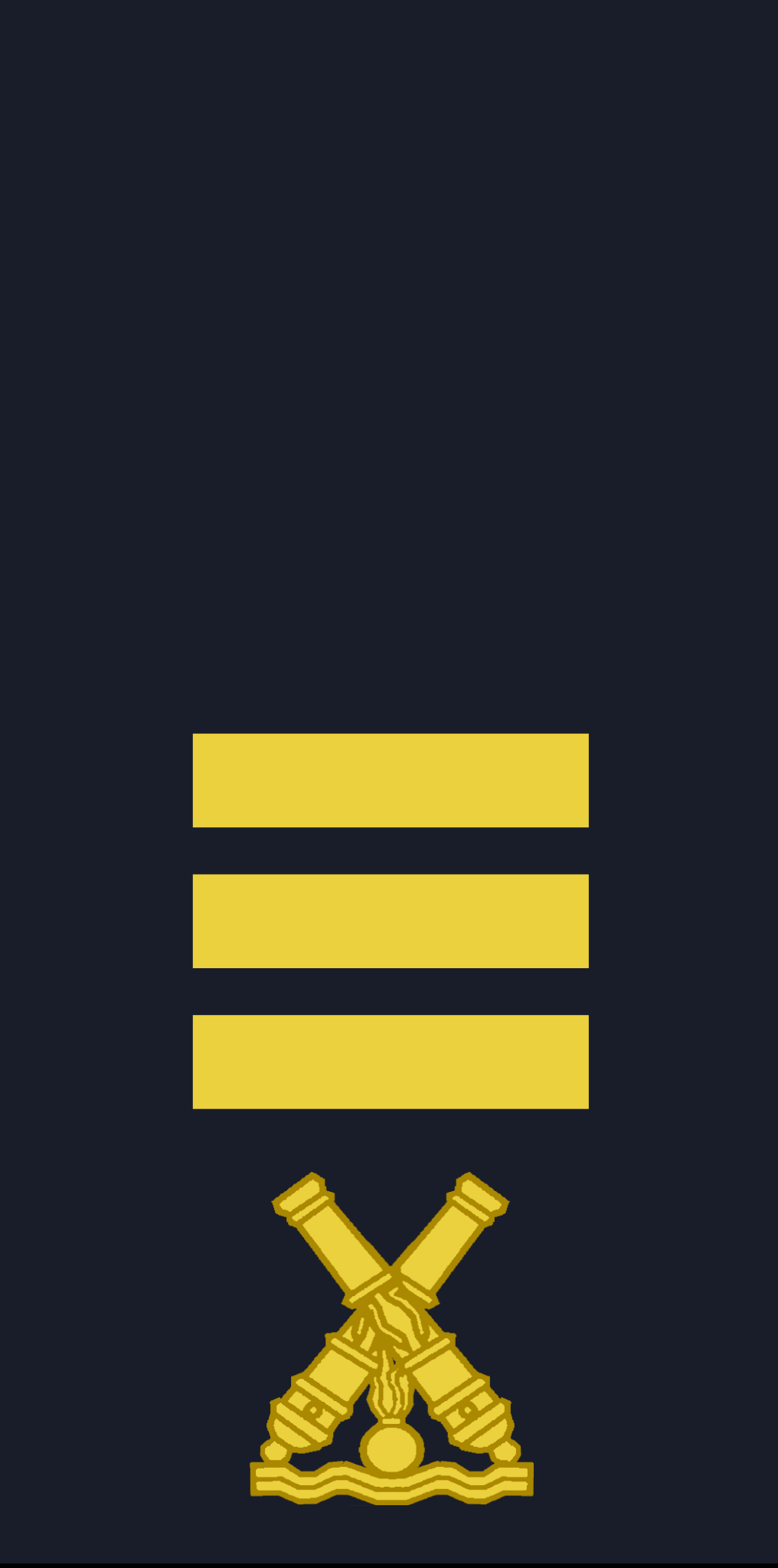
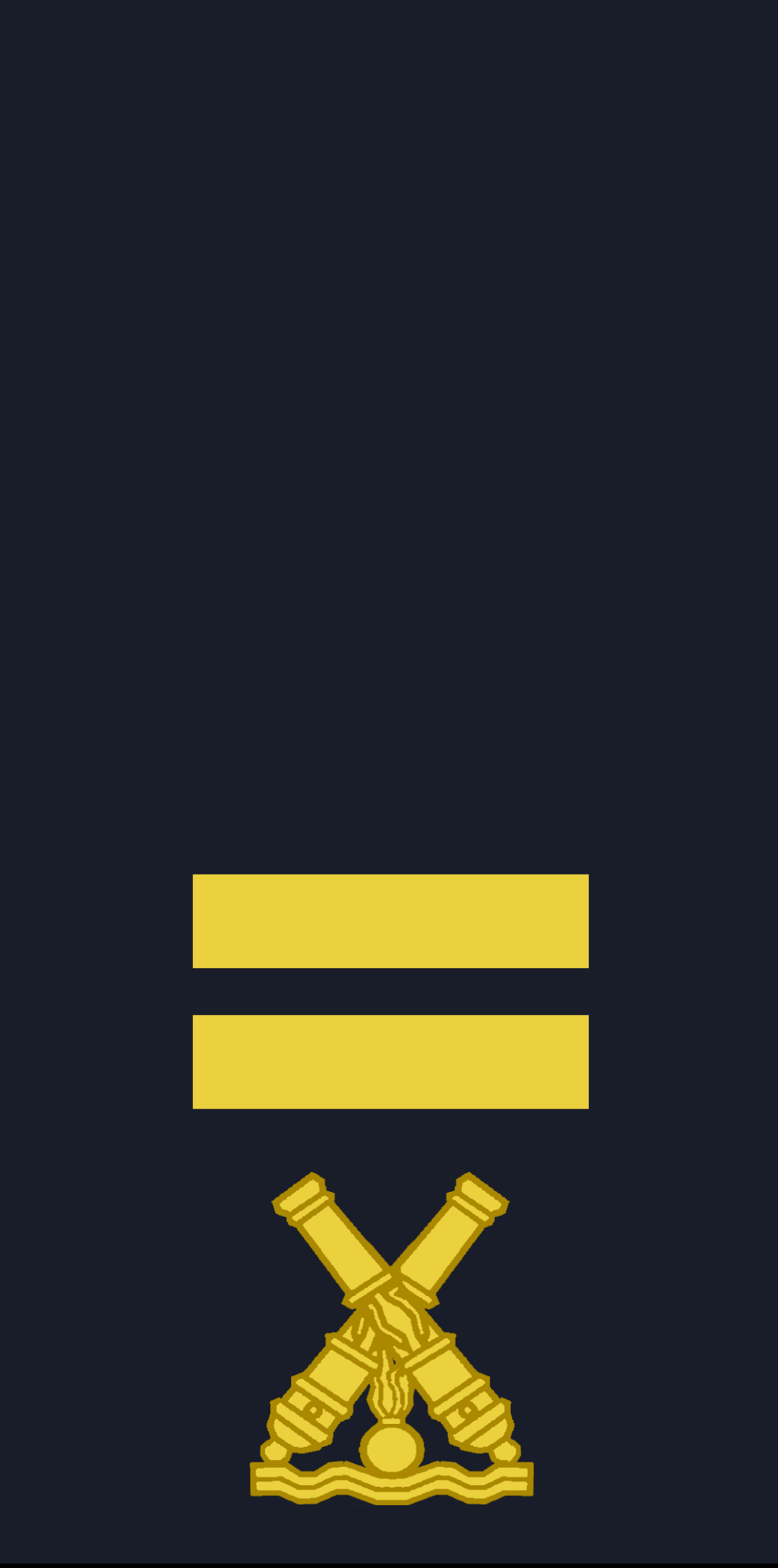
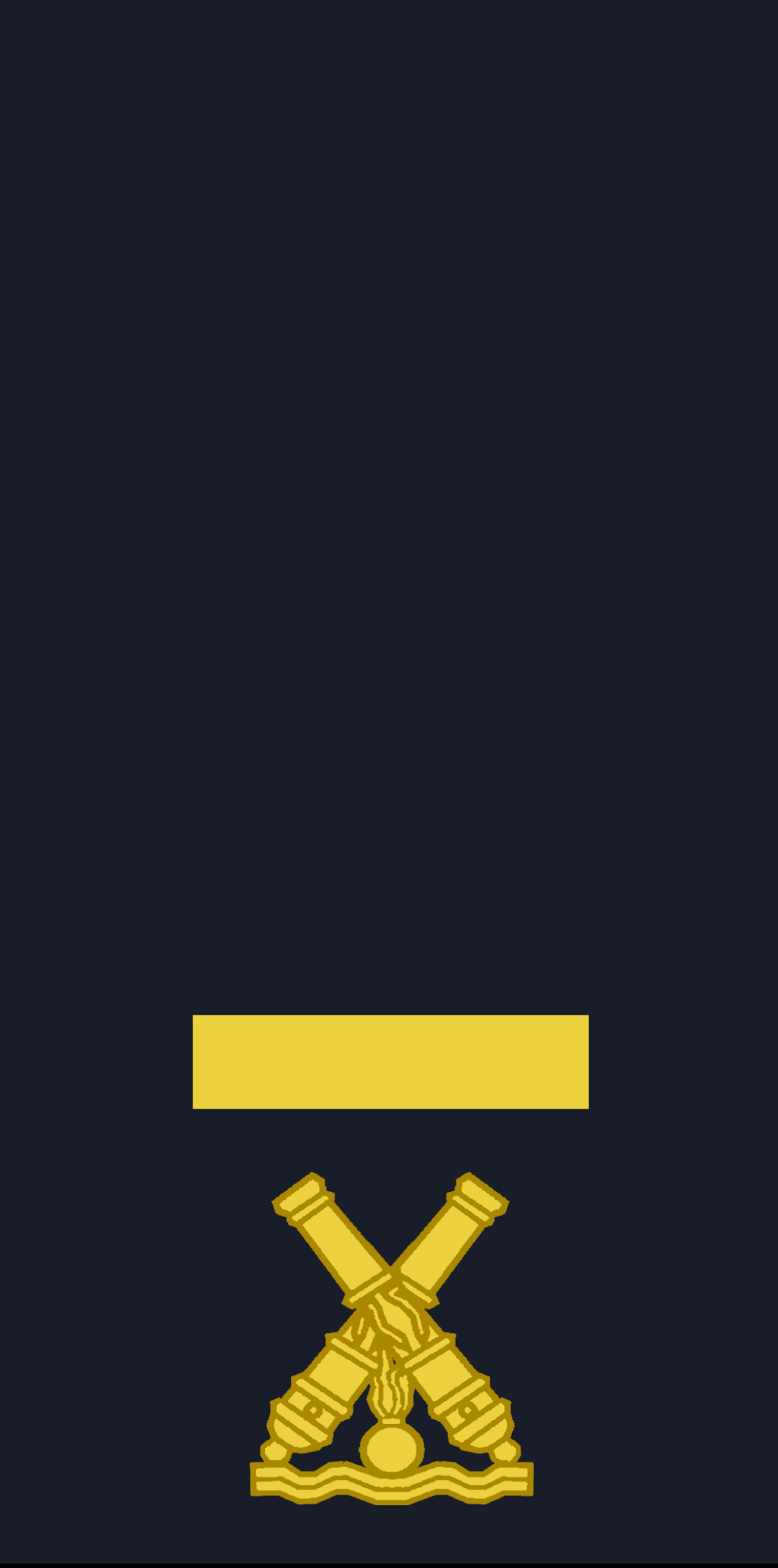
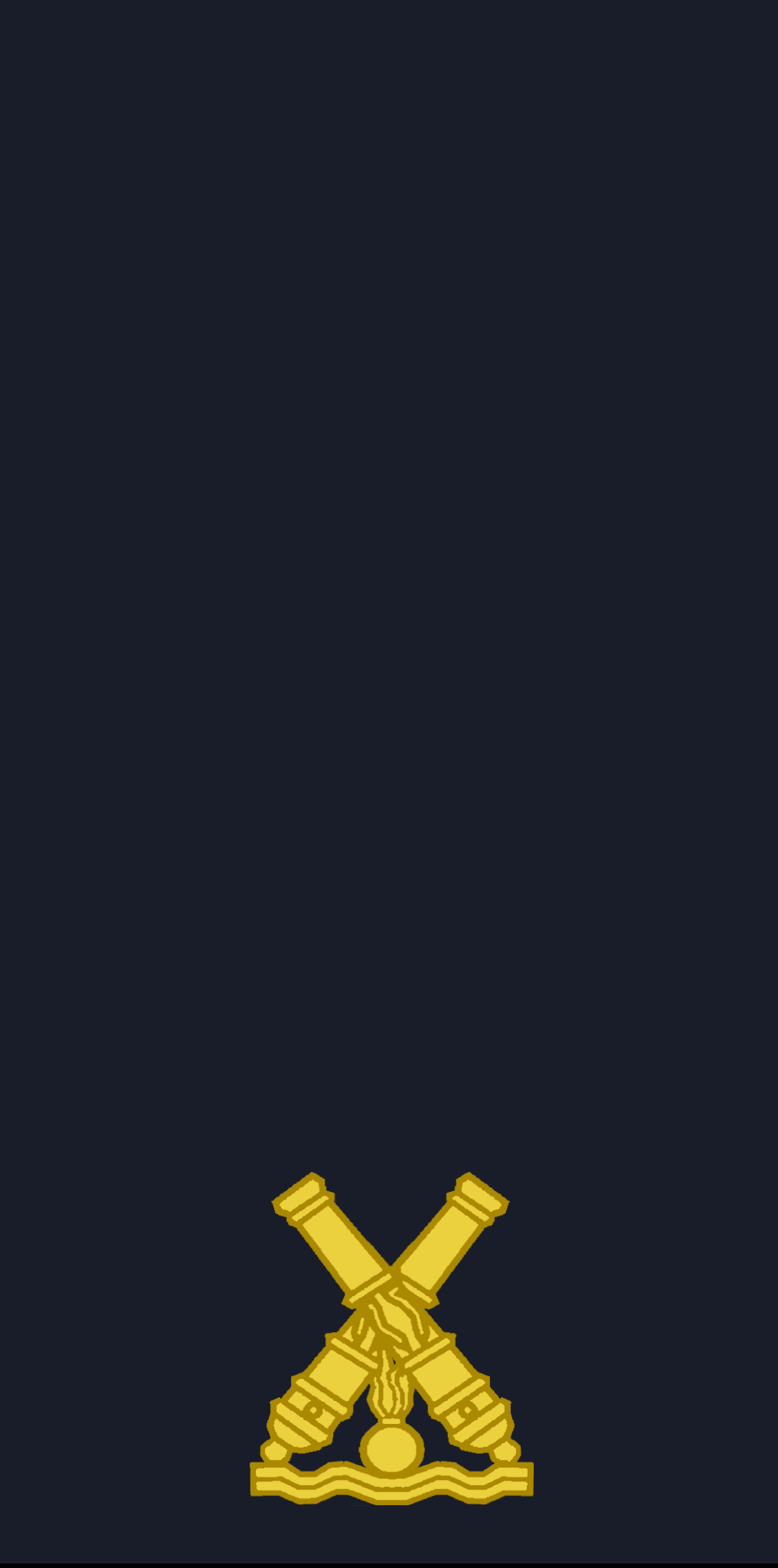
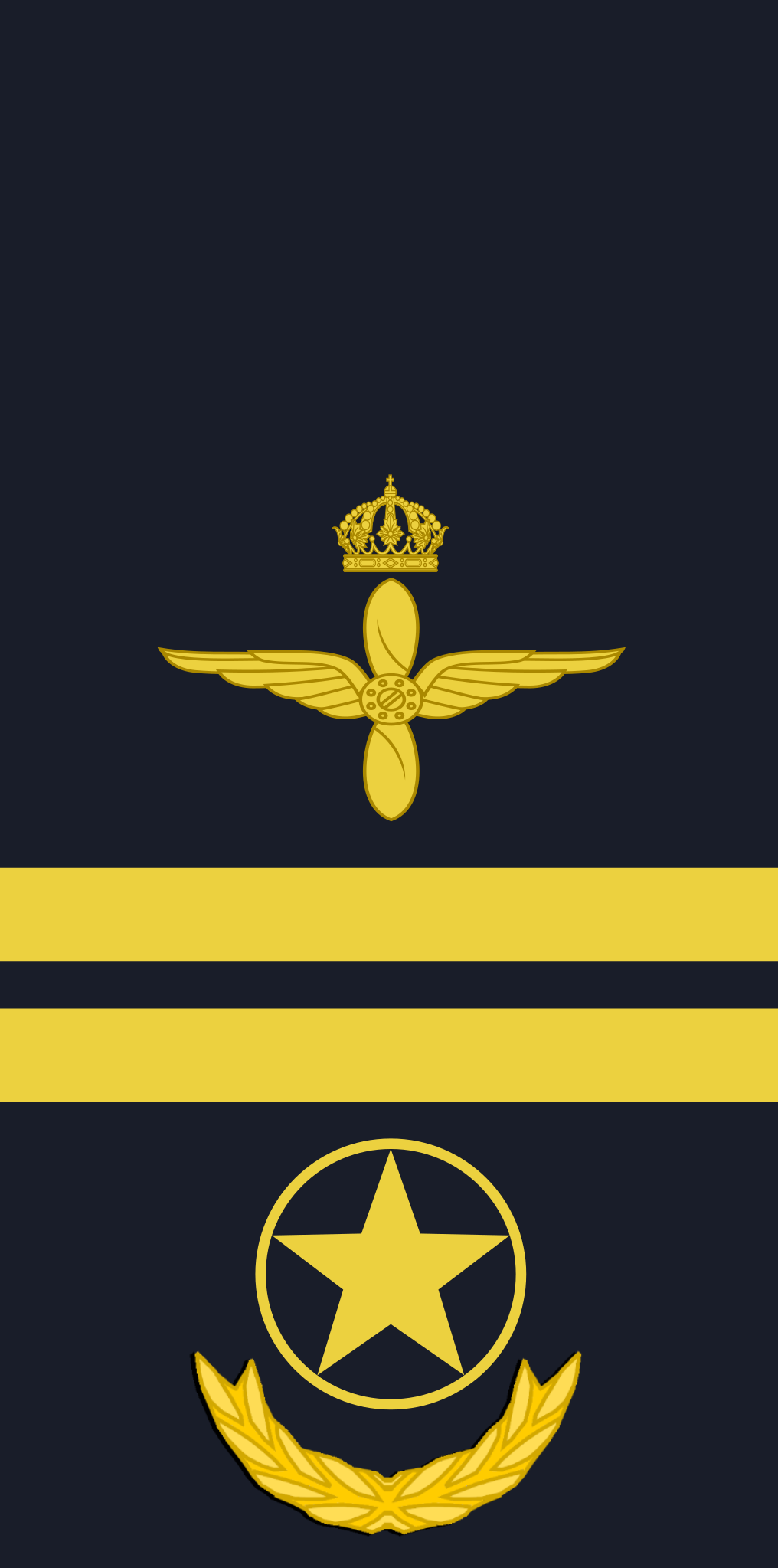
NATO code	OR-9	OR-8	OR-7		OR-6		OR-5		OR-4	OR-3	OR-2				OR-1
Field uniform
Swedish Army
Swedish Army	Regementsförvaltare	Förvaltare	Överfanjunkare	Fanjunkare	Översergeant	Sergeant	Överfurir	Furir	Korpral	Vicekorpral	Menig 4	Menig 3	Menig 2	Menig 1	Menig
Swedish Navy
Swedish Navy	Flottiljförvaltare	Förvaltare	Överfanjunkare	Fanjunkare	Översergeant	Sergeant	Överfurir	Furir	Korpral	Vicekorpral	Menig 4	Menig 3	Menig 2	Menig 1	Menig
(Sweden) Swedish Amphibious Corps
(Sweden) Swedish Amphibious Corps	Regementsförvaltare	Förvaltare	Överfanjunkare	Fanjunkare	Översergeant	Sergeant	Överfurir	Furir	Korpral	Vicekorpral	Menig 4	Menig 3	Menig 2	Menig 1	Menig
Swedish Air Force
Swedish Air Force	Flottiljförvaltare	Förvaltare	Överfanjunkare	Fanjunkare	Översergeant	Sergeant	Överfurir	Furir	Korpral	Vicekorpral	Menig 4	Menig 3	Menig 2	Menig 1	Menig
NATO code	OR-9	OR-8	OR-7		OR-6		OR-5		OR-4	OR-3	OR-2				OR-1

== Former ranks ==
=== Ranks 2009–2019 ===
Since 2009, there are three categories of ranks, Officerare, Specialistofficerare and GSS- Gruppbefäl, soldater och sjömän

Officerare (Officers)

Officers lead units from platoon and up. They are trained at the Military Academy Karlberg in a three-year academic program(180 ECTS credits) and graduate as fänrik. Cadets with no prior service must complete a 6-9 months preparatory course before they start at the academy.

Specialistofficerare (Senior NCOs, lit. Specialist Officers)

Specialistofficerare are educated at specialist schools and centres for 1,5 years and graduate as Förste Sergeant. Experienced soldiers who have served as corporals and sergeants may take a shortened course. Civilians must complete a preparatory course before the 1.5 year specialist training starts.

GSS - Gruppbefäl, soldater och sjömän (junior NCOs, soldiers and seamen, lit. Squad leaders, soldiers and seamen)

The two highest ranks in this category, korpral and sergeant, form their own sub-category, gruppbefäl. They command squads of approx. 8 men. Ordinary soldiers are given the rank menig 1 klass with different insignia depending on how long they have served.

When the professional NCO corps was reintroduced in 2009 it was decided that some ranks in this category should, like the old underofficerare ranks in 1960–1972, have a relative rank higher than the most junior officers. The current relative ranks are shown in the table below.

OF (Officer Ranks)	Other Ranks (Specialistofficerare)
OF-9 (General, Amiral)	
OF-8 (Generallöjtnant, Viceamiral)
OF-7 (Generalmajor, Konteramiral)
OF-6 (Brigadgeneral, Flottiljamiral)
OF-5 (Överste, Kommendör)
OF-4 (Överstelöjtnant, Kommendörkapten)
	OR-9 (Regements-/Flottiljförvaltare)
OF-3 (Major, Örlogskapten)	
OF-2 (Kapten)
	OR-8 (Förvaltare)
OF-1 (Löjtnant)
	OR-7 (Fanjunkare)
OF-1 (Fänrik)	
	OR-6 (Förste Sergeant)
GSS - Squad leaders, soldiers and seamen
OR-5 (Sergeant)
OR-4 (Korpral)
OR-3 (Vice korpral)
OR-2 (Menig 1kl)
OR-1 (Menig)

Rank insignia

The table below shows ranks according to seniority, with the most senior to the left. OF denotes officers, OR other ranks (as per STANAG 2116). Those ranks were ratified by the supreme commander on October 24, 2008, and became effective as of January 1, 2009. Military ranks of (primarily) Great Britain have been used as a basis for harmonization with NATO.

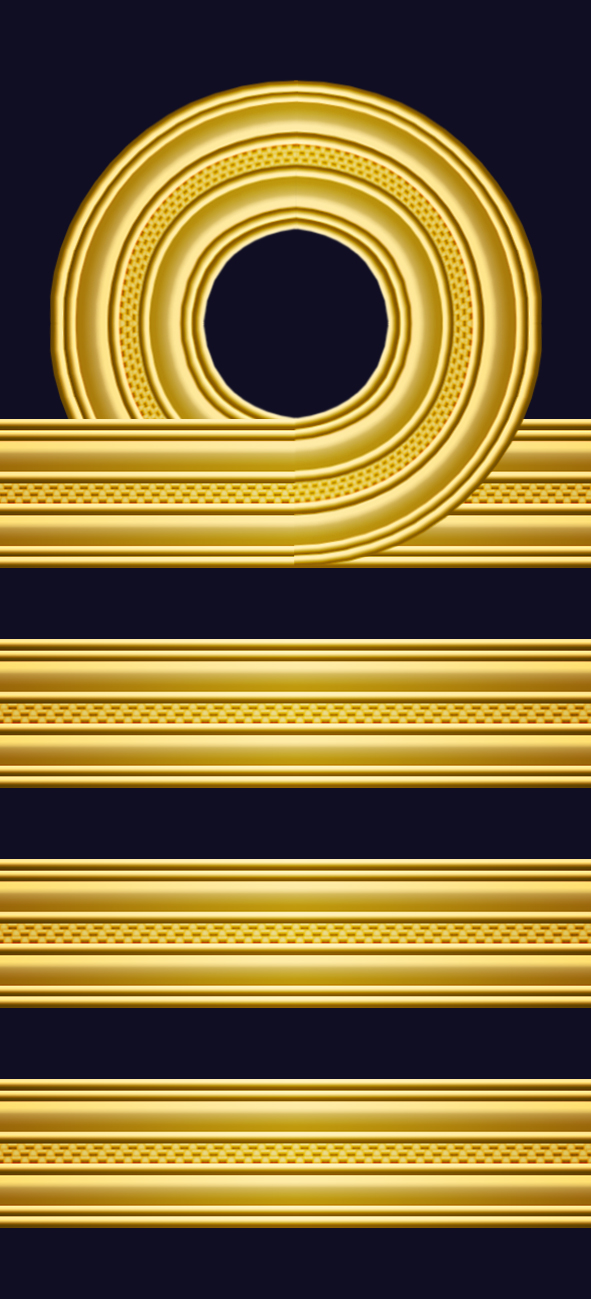
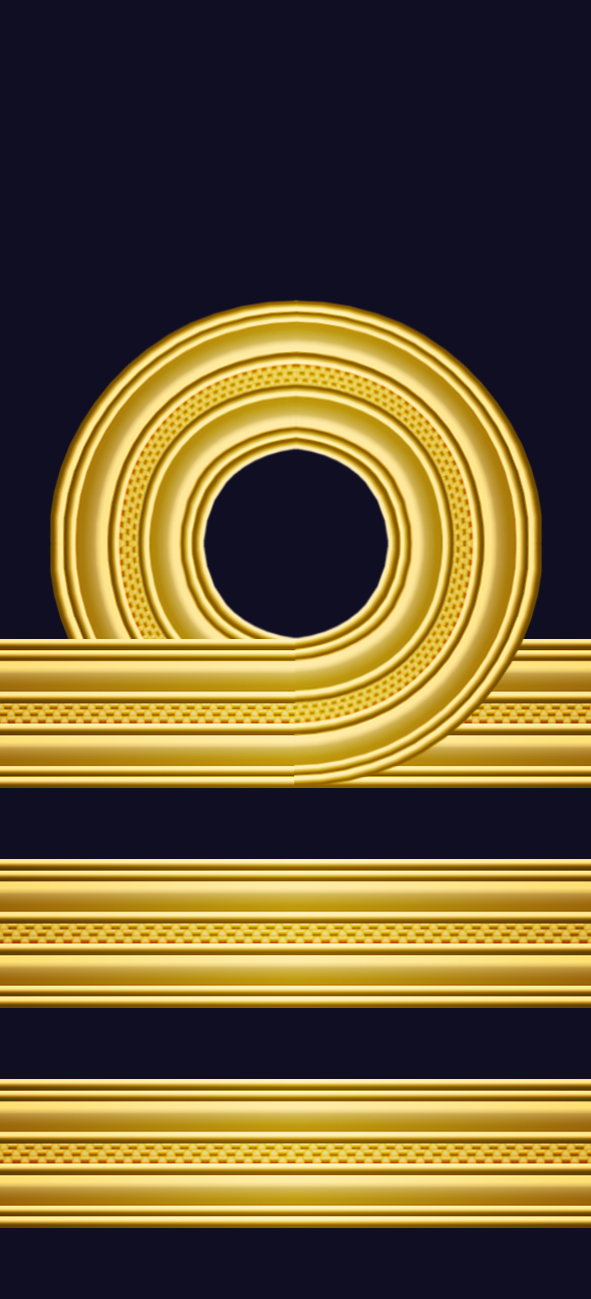
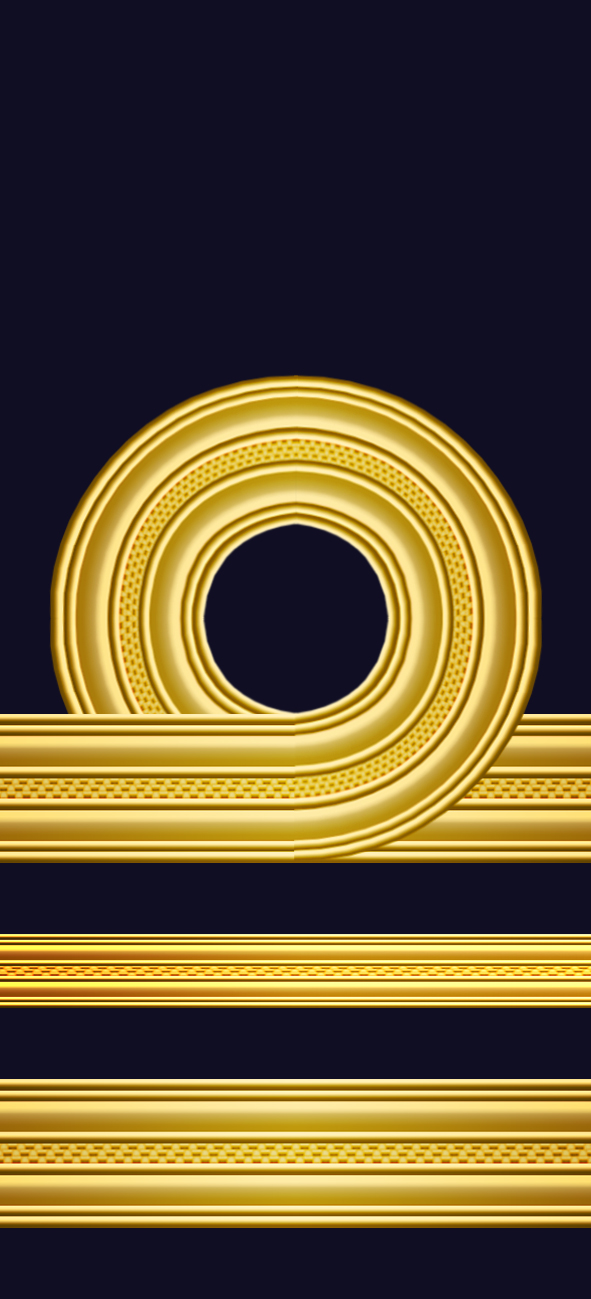
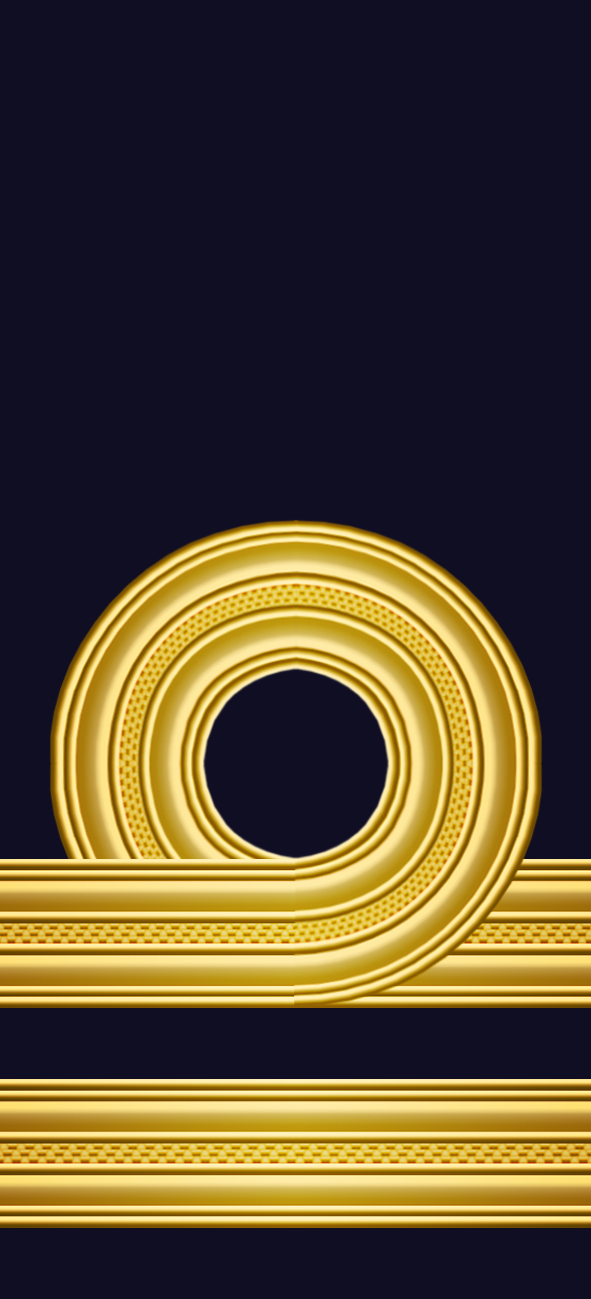
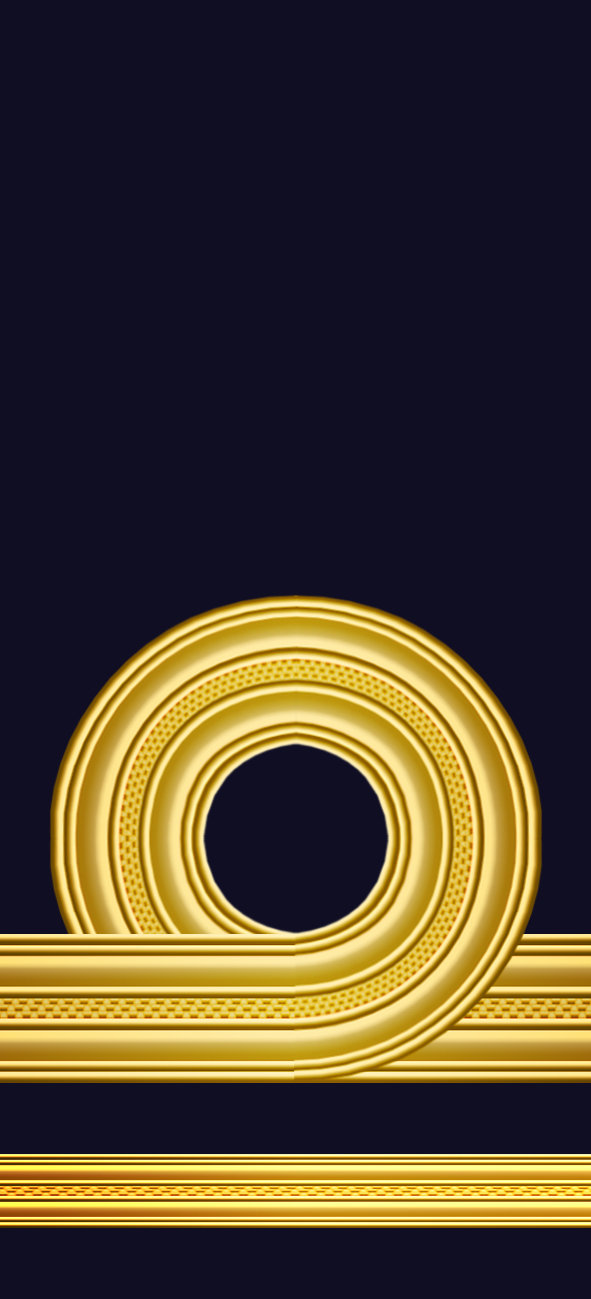
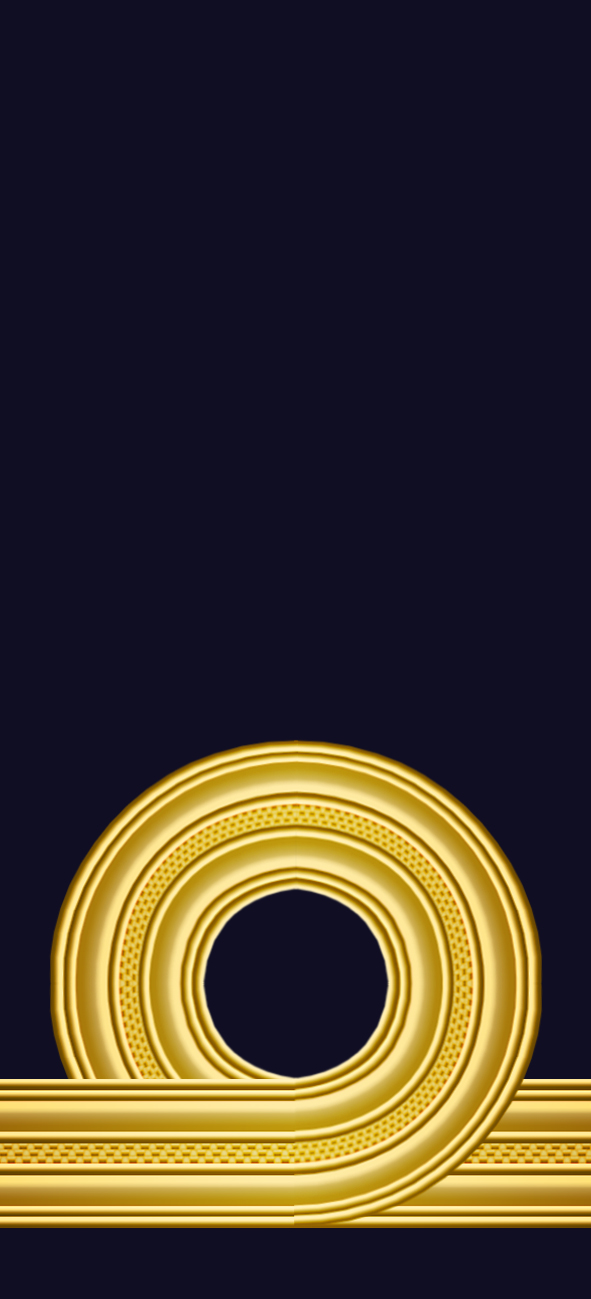
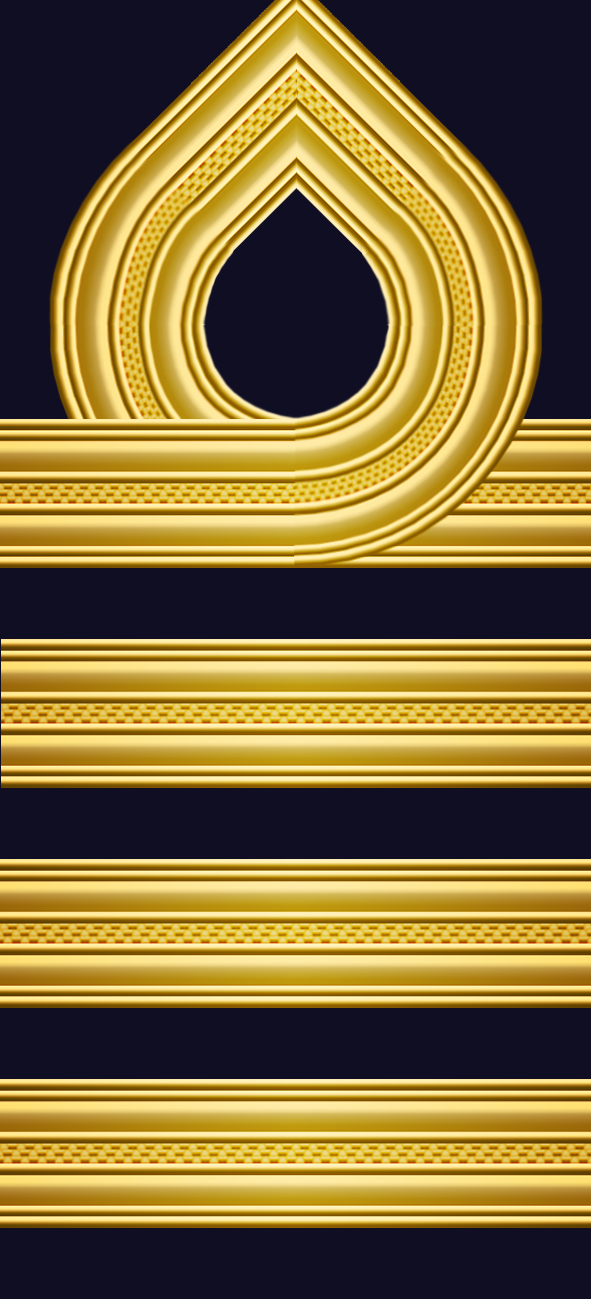
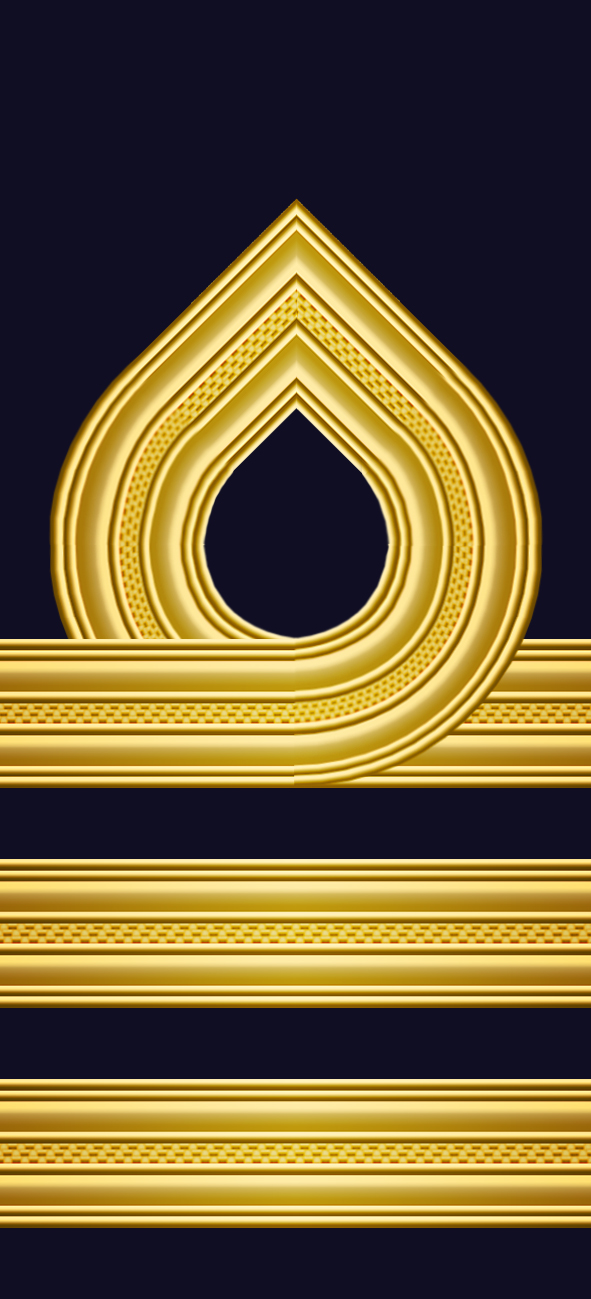
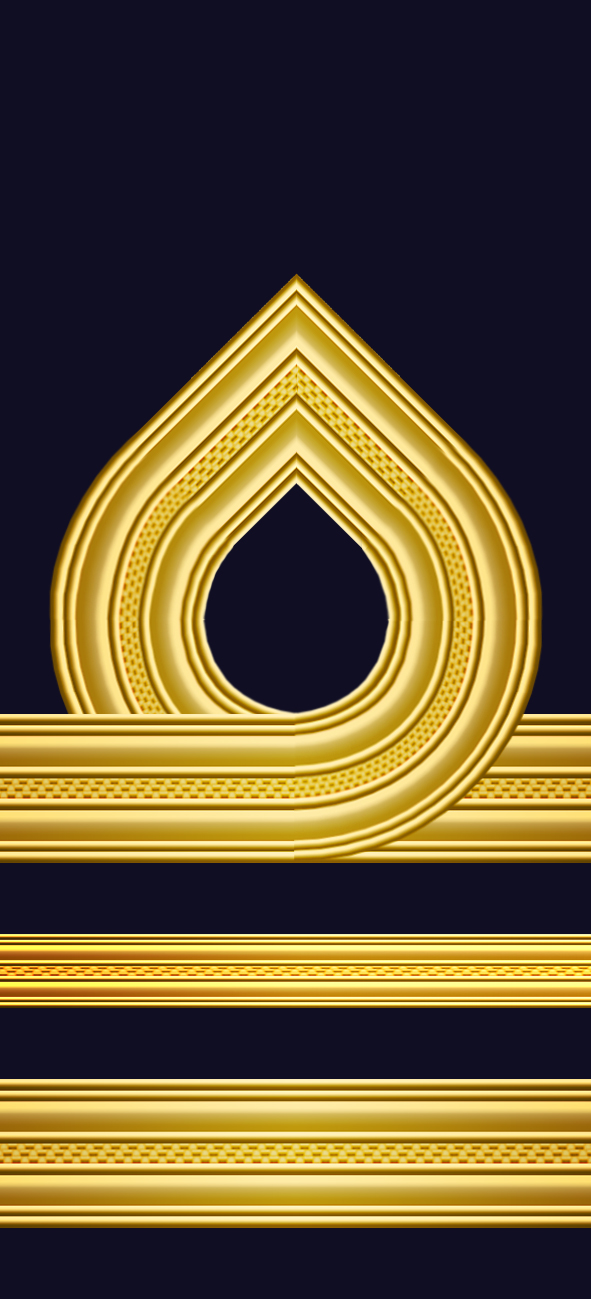
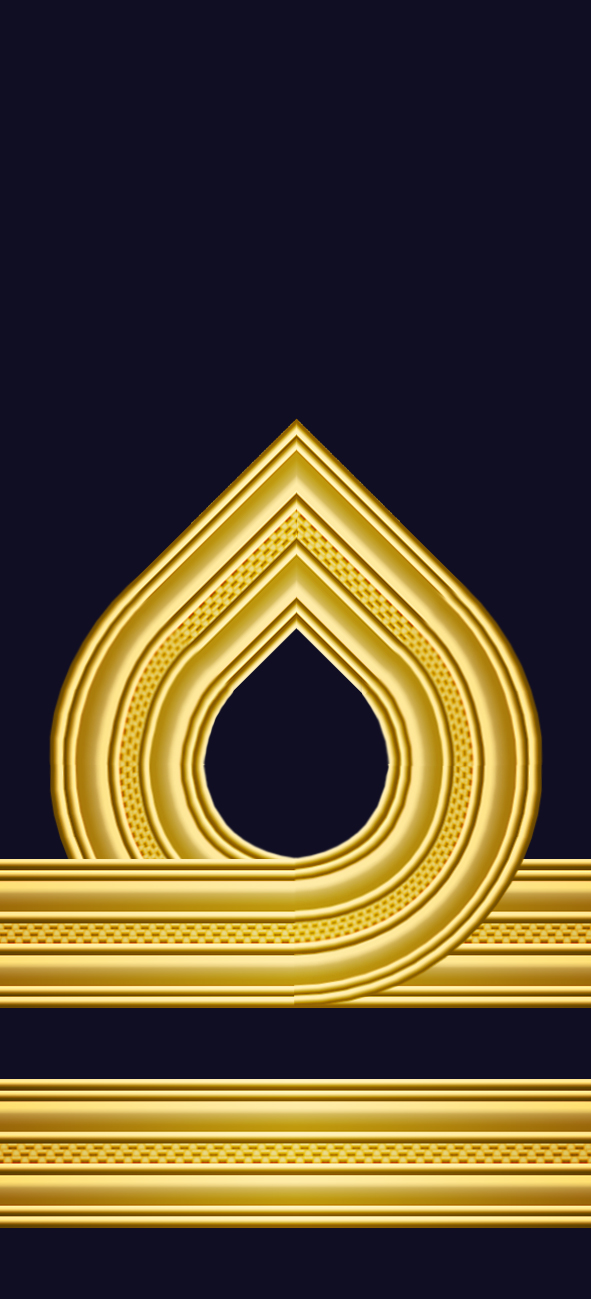
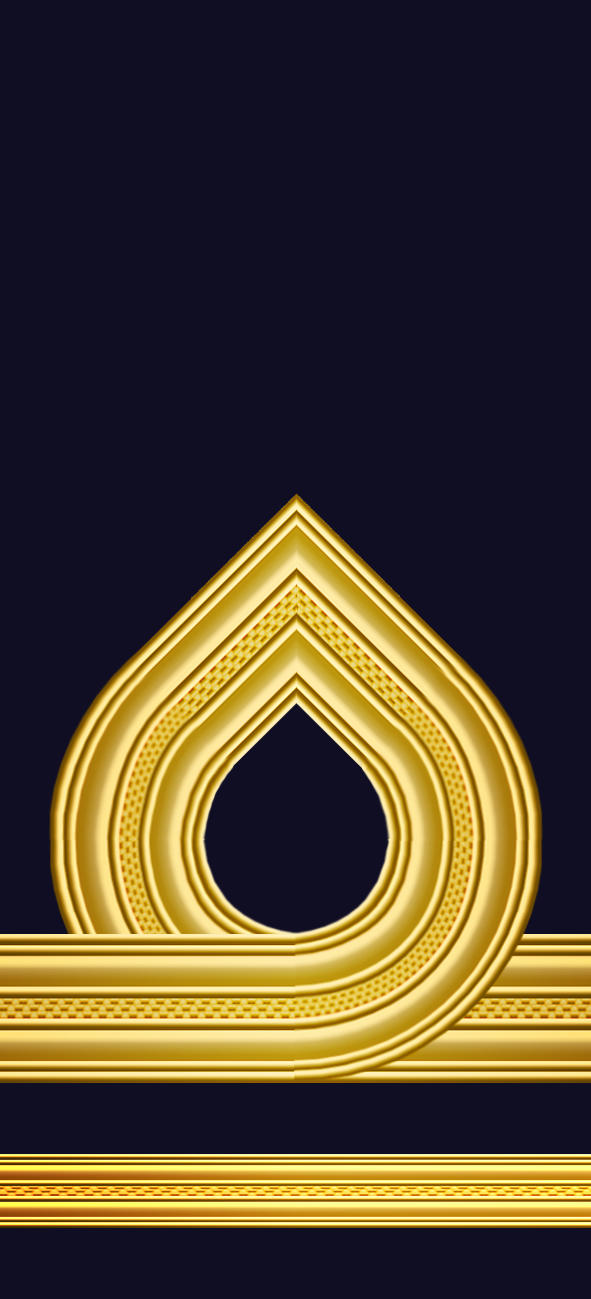
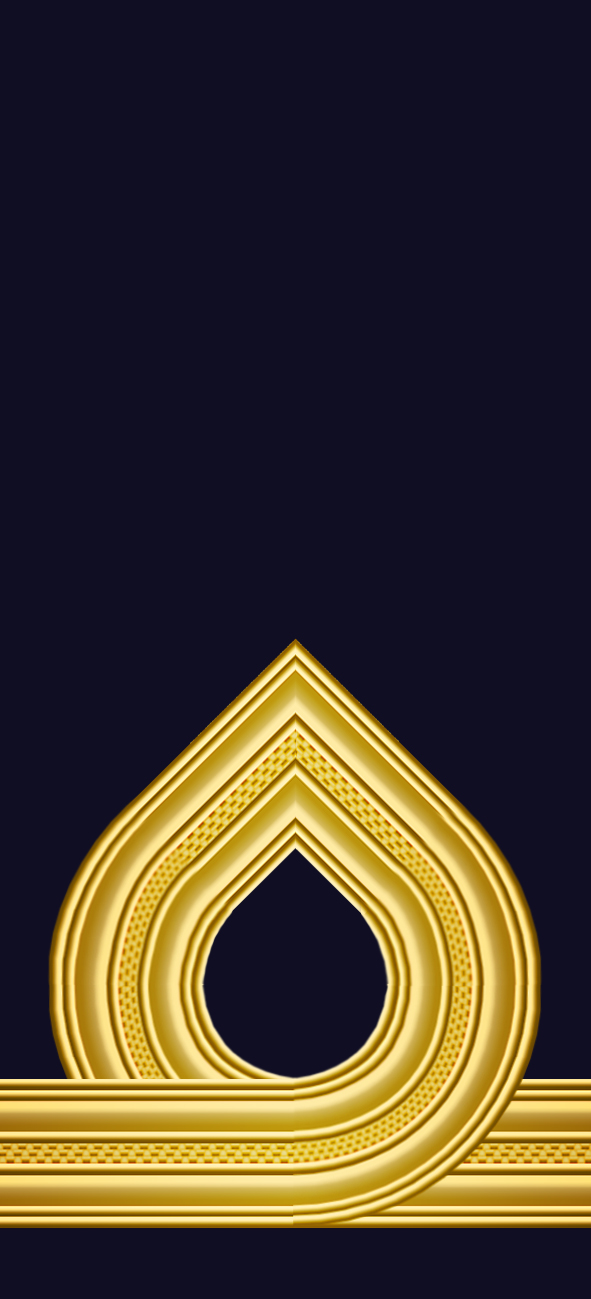
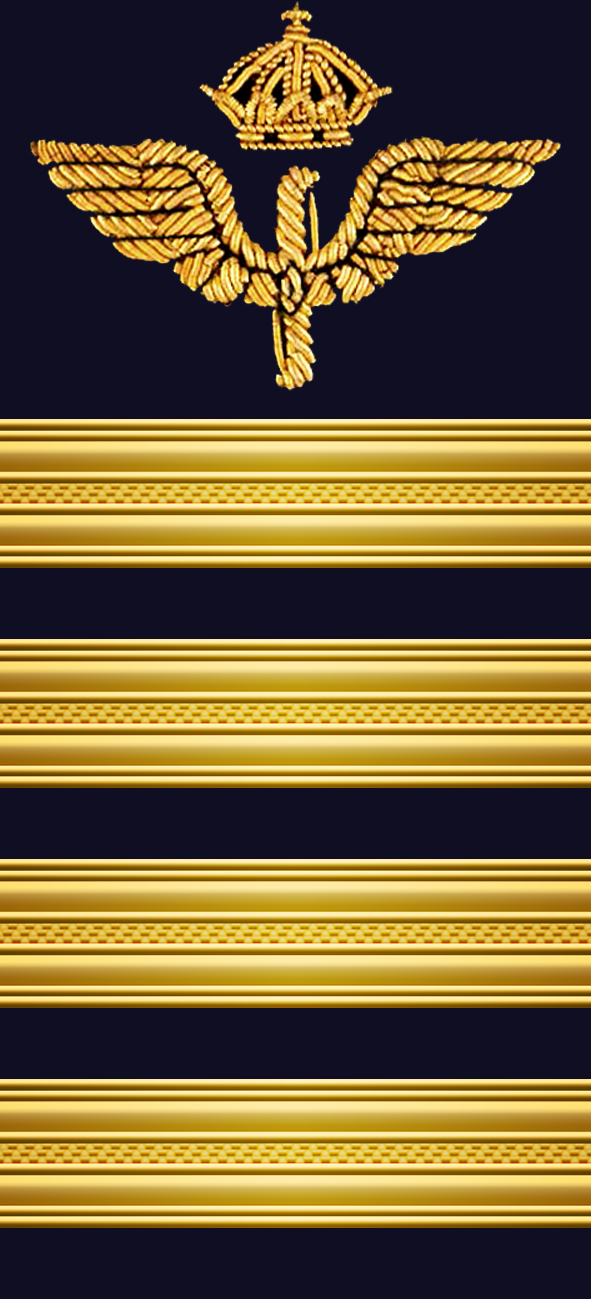
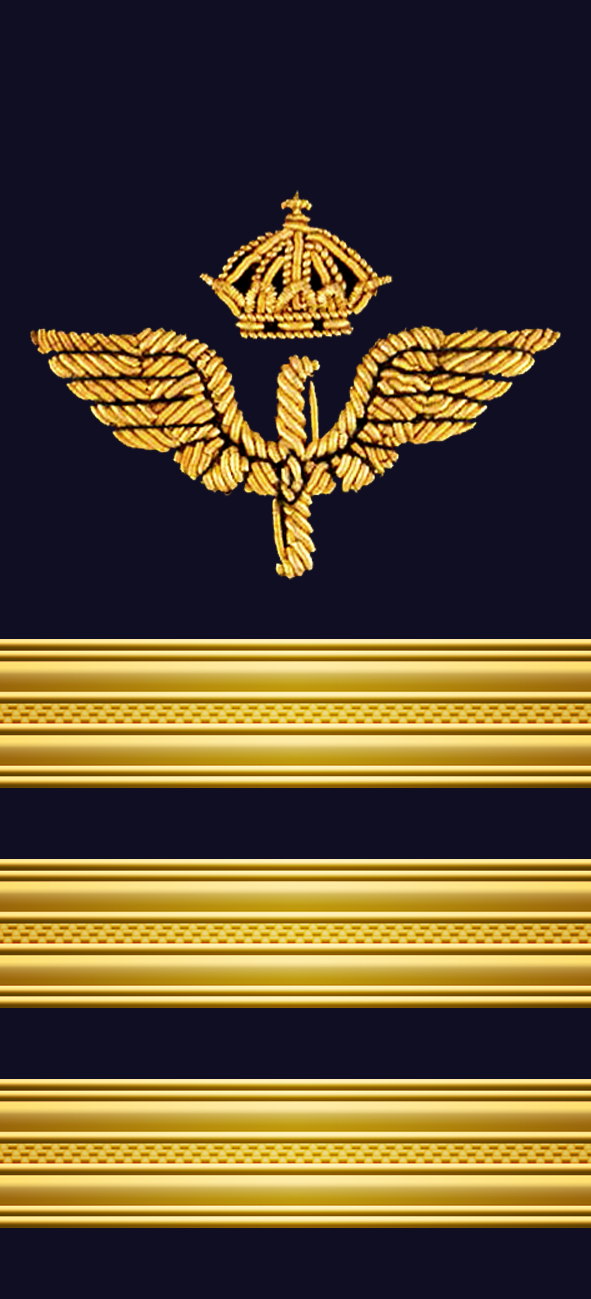
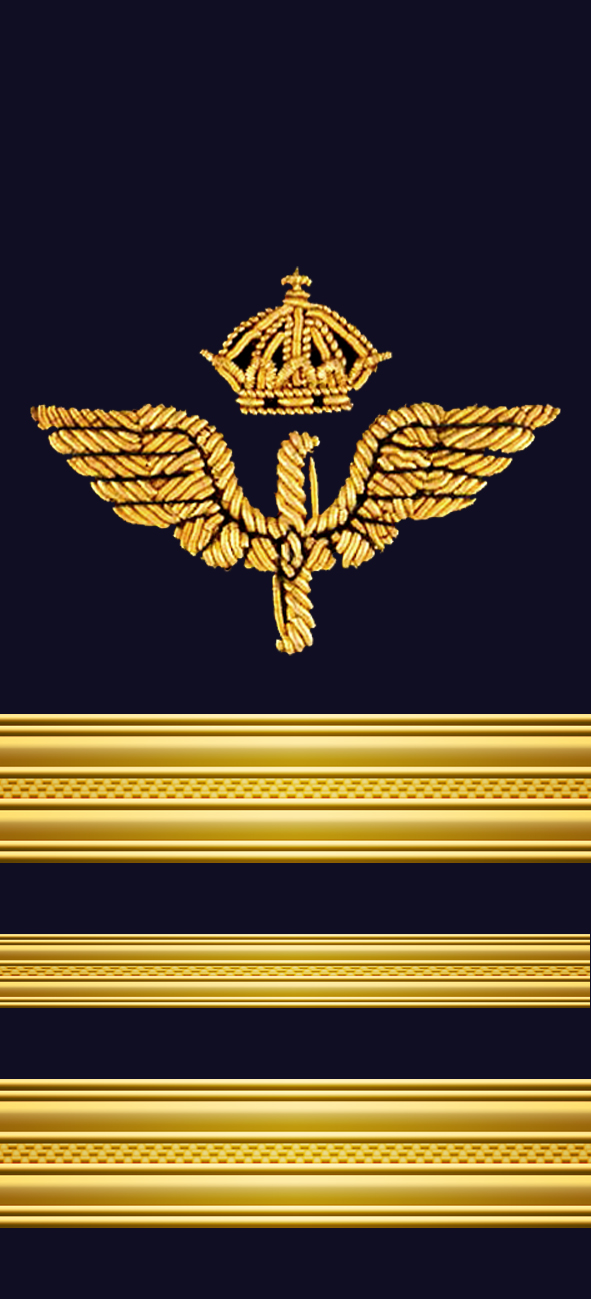
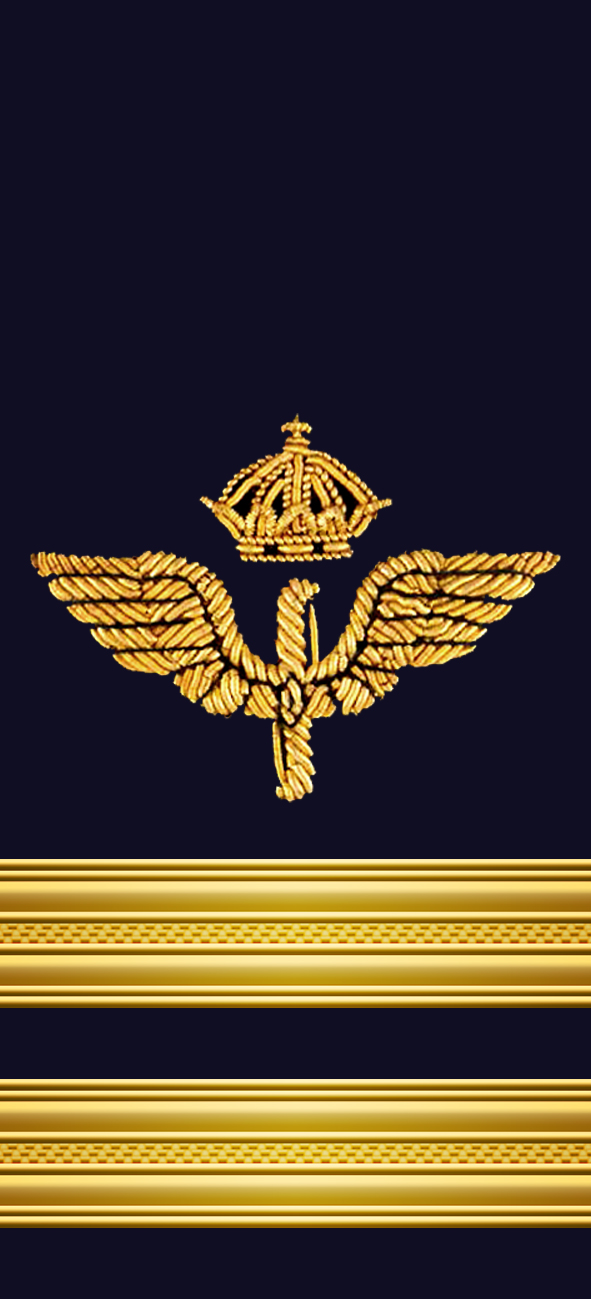
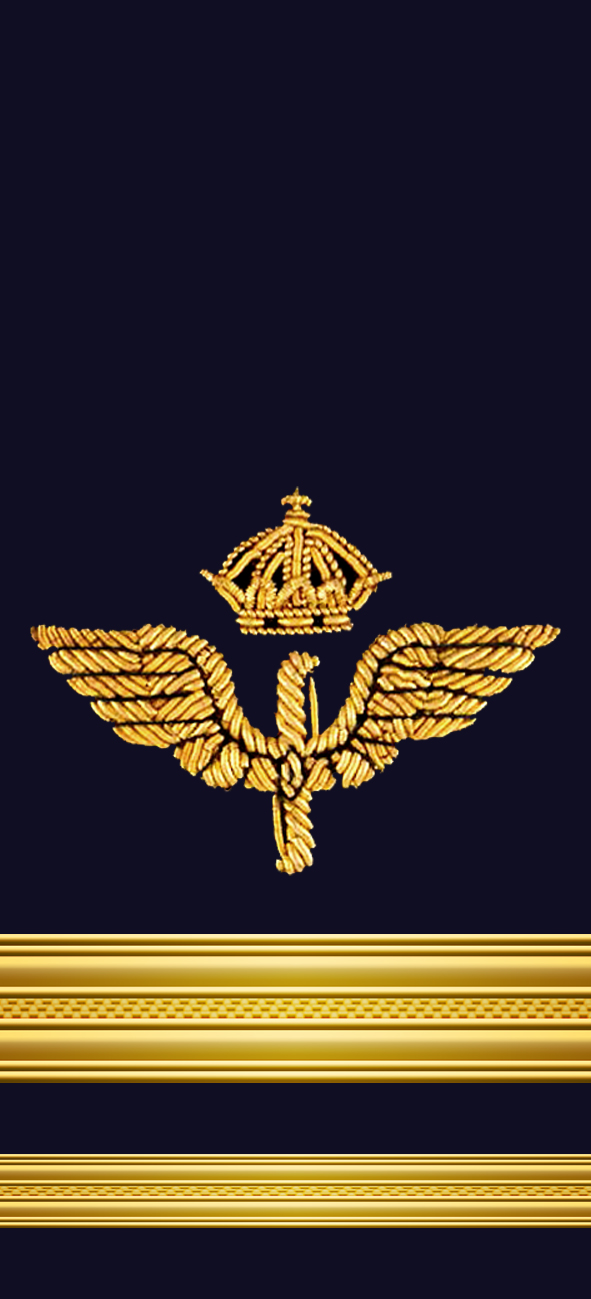
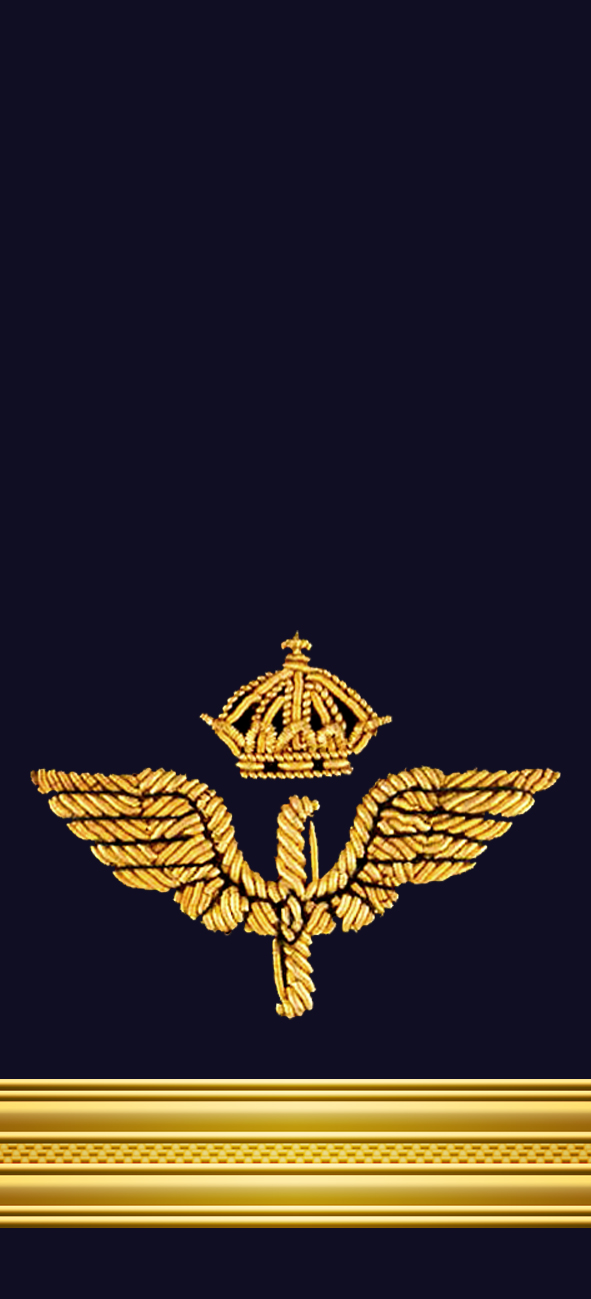
Rank group	General / flag officers				Senior officers			Junior officers
Swedish Army (2009–2019)														No insignia
Swedish Army (2009–2019)	General	Generallöjtnant	Generalmajor	Brigadgeneral	Överste	Överstelöjtnant	Major	Kapten	Löjtnant	Fänrik	Kadett; 3rd year (Note: Equivalent to OR-5)	Kadett; 2nd year (Note: Equivalent to OR-4)	Kadett; 1st year (Note: Equivalent to OR-3)	Kadett; Officer Candidate (Note: Equivalent to OR-2)
Swedish Navy (2009–2019)
Swedish Navy (2009–2019)	Amiral	Viceamiral	Konteramiral	Flottiljamiral	Kommendör	Kommendörkapten	Örlogskapten	Kapten	Löjtnant	Fänrik	Kadett
(Sweden) Swedish Amphibious Corps (2009–2019)
(Sweden) Swedish Amphibious Corps (2009–2019)	General	Generallöjtnant	Generalmajor	Brigadgeneral	Överste	Överstelöjtnant	Major	Kapten	Löjtnant	Fänrik	Kadett
Swedish Air Force (2009–2019)
Swedish Air Force (2009–2019)	General	Generallöjtnant	Generalmajor	Brigadgeneral	Överste	Överstelöjtnant	Major	Kapten	Löjtnant	Fänrik	Kadett
Swedish Home Guard (2009–2019)
Swedish Home Guard (2009–2019)							Major	Kapten	Löjtnant	Fänrik
Rank group	General/flag officers				Senior officers			Junior officers

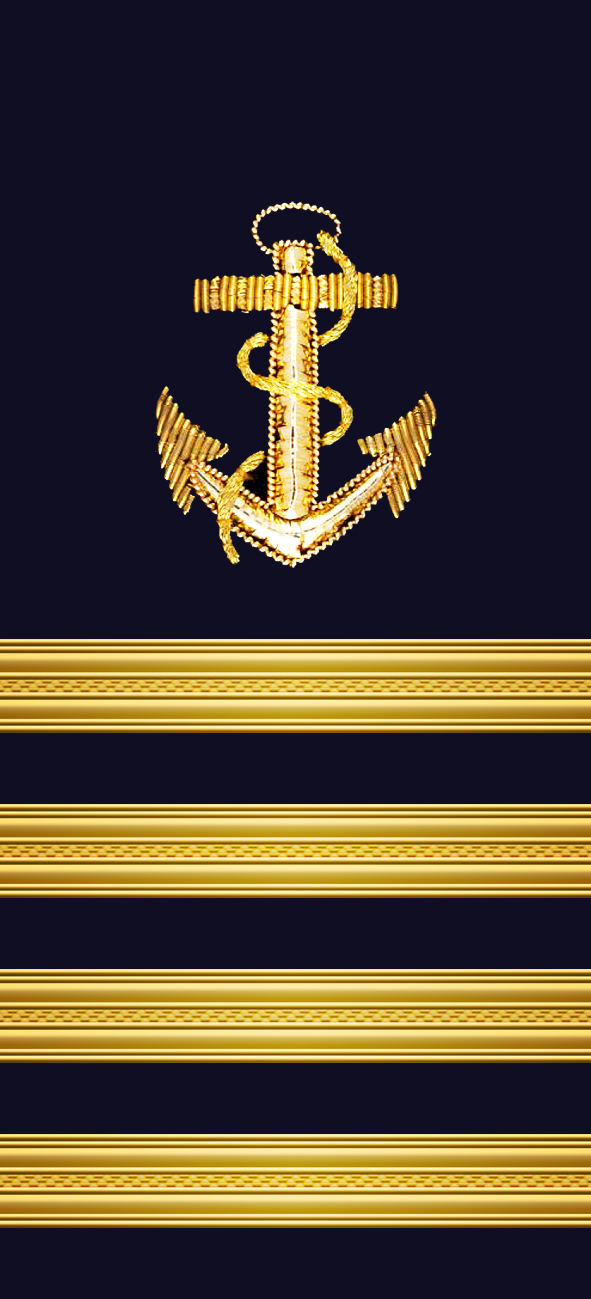
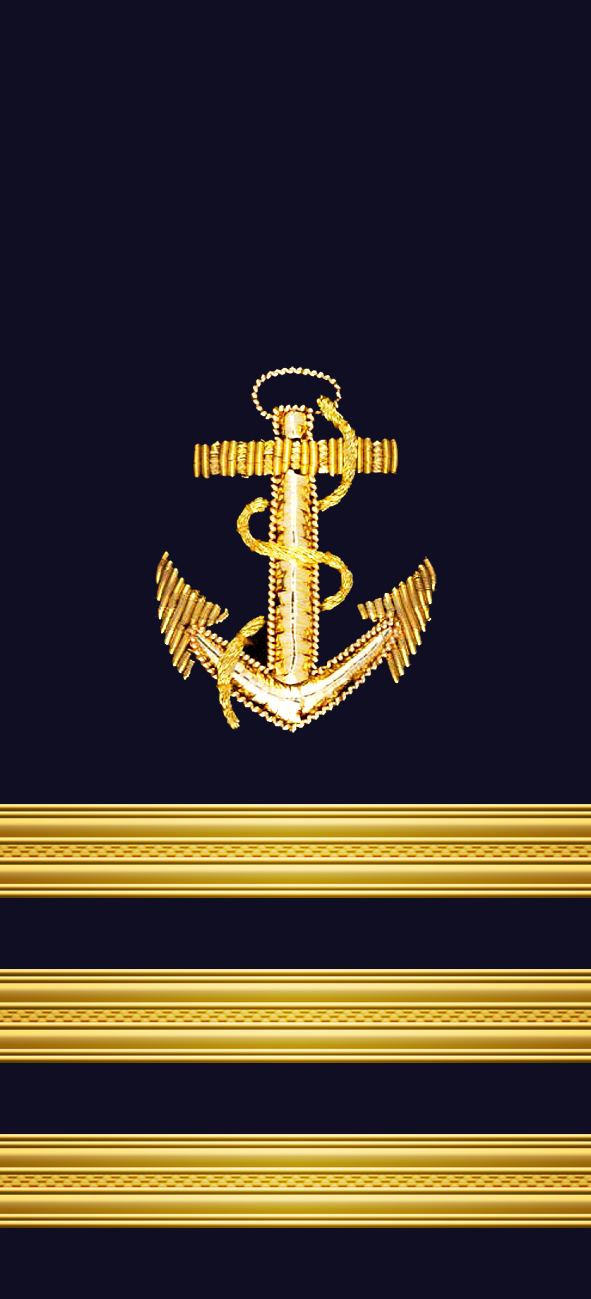
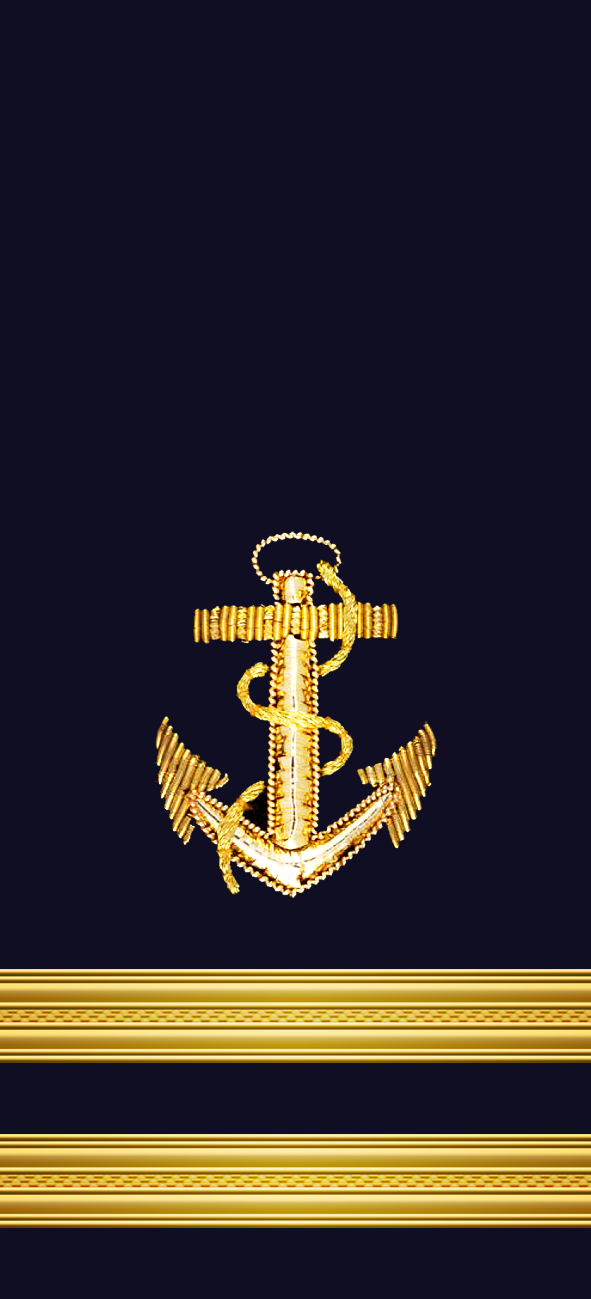
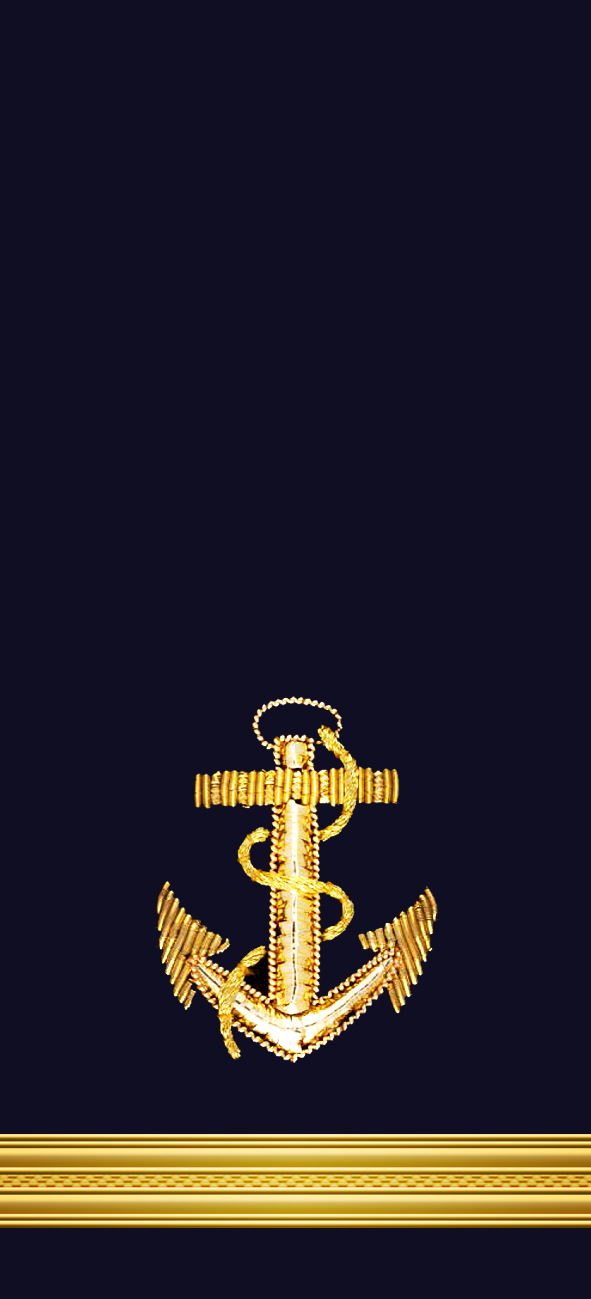
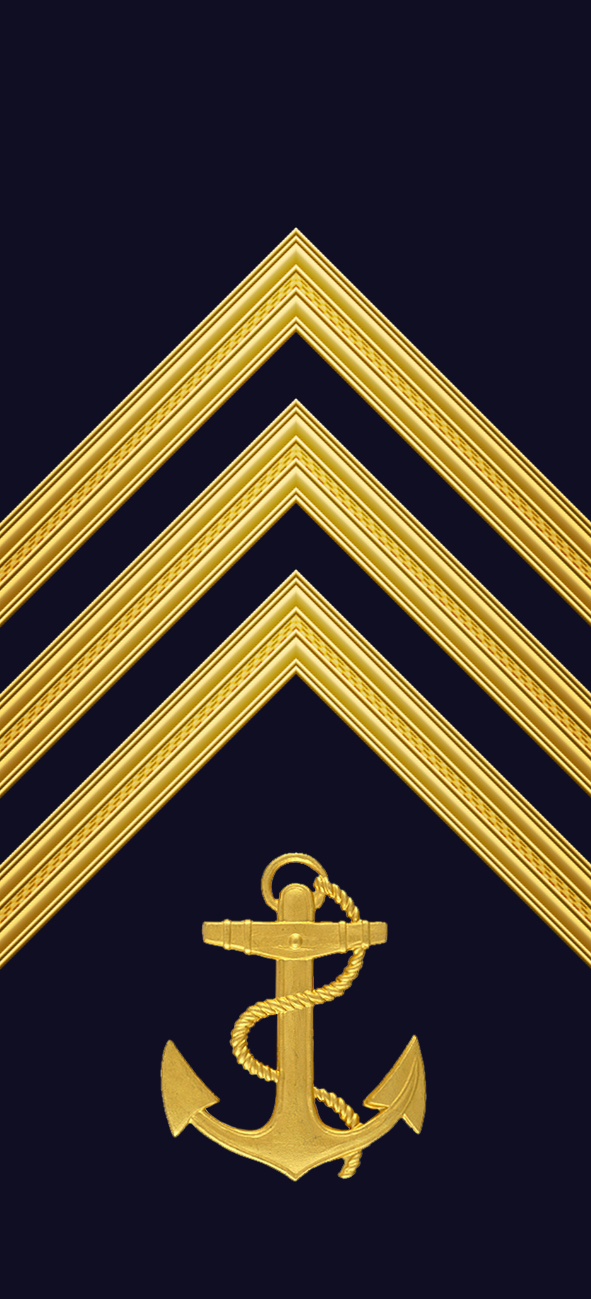
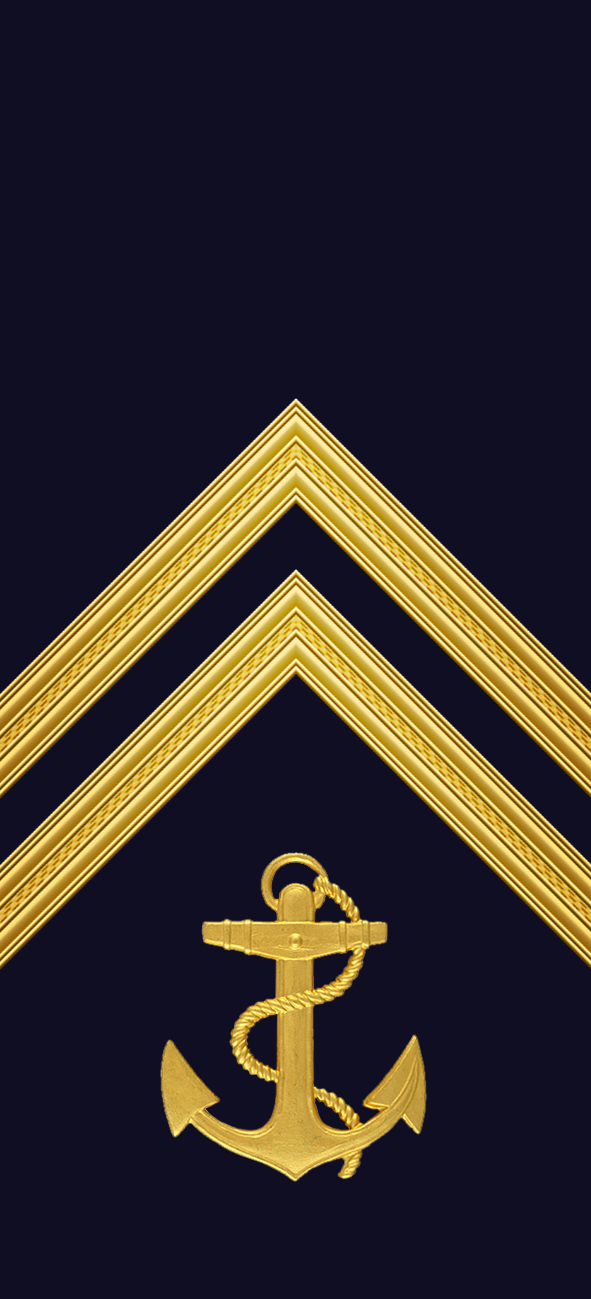
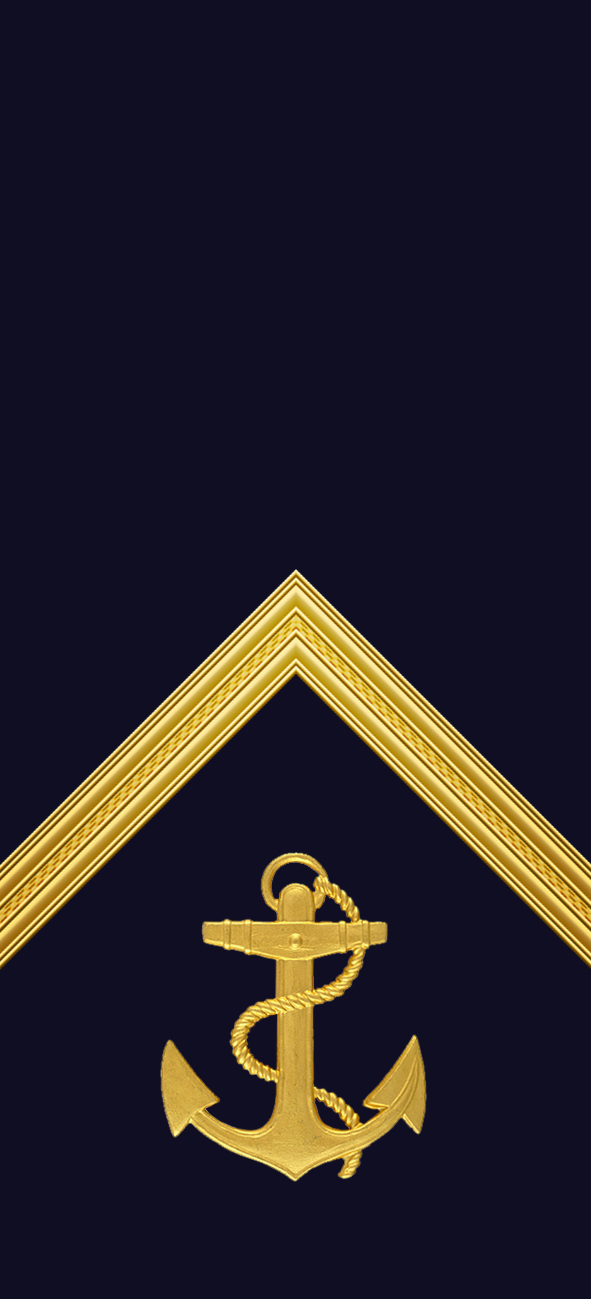
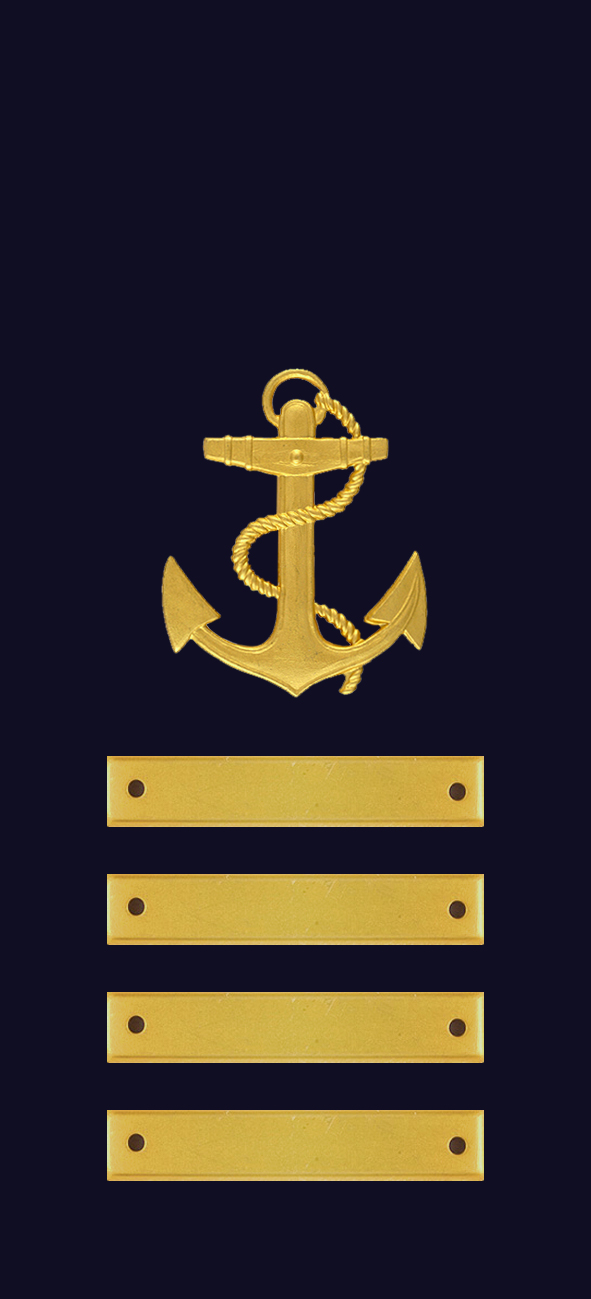
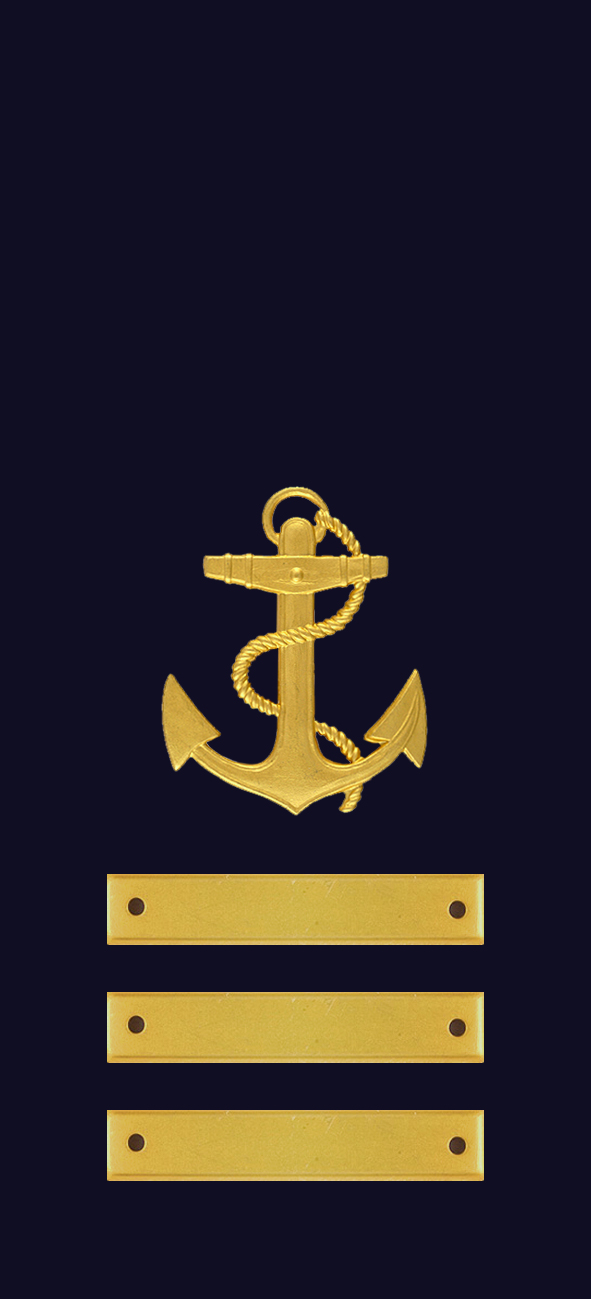
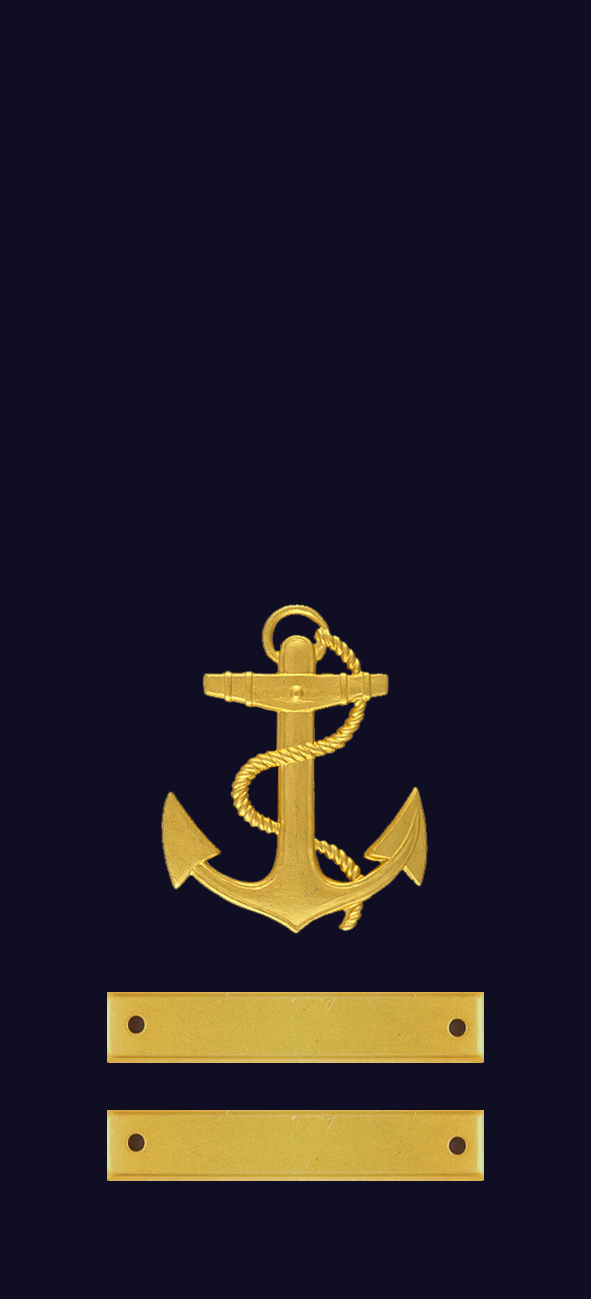
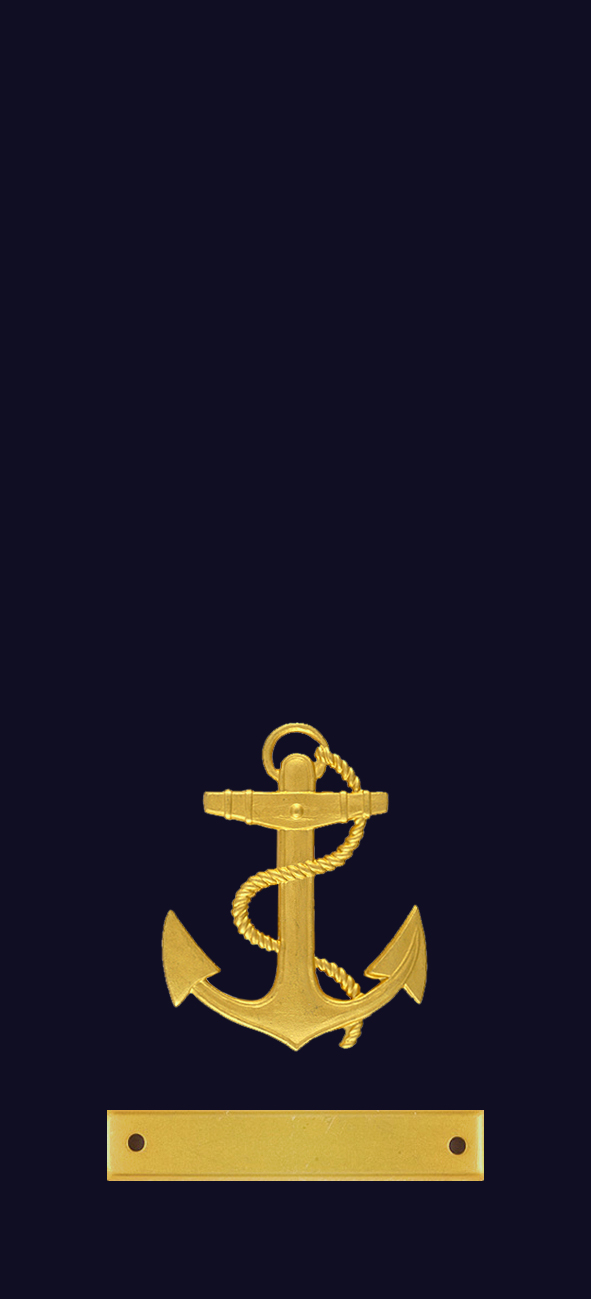
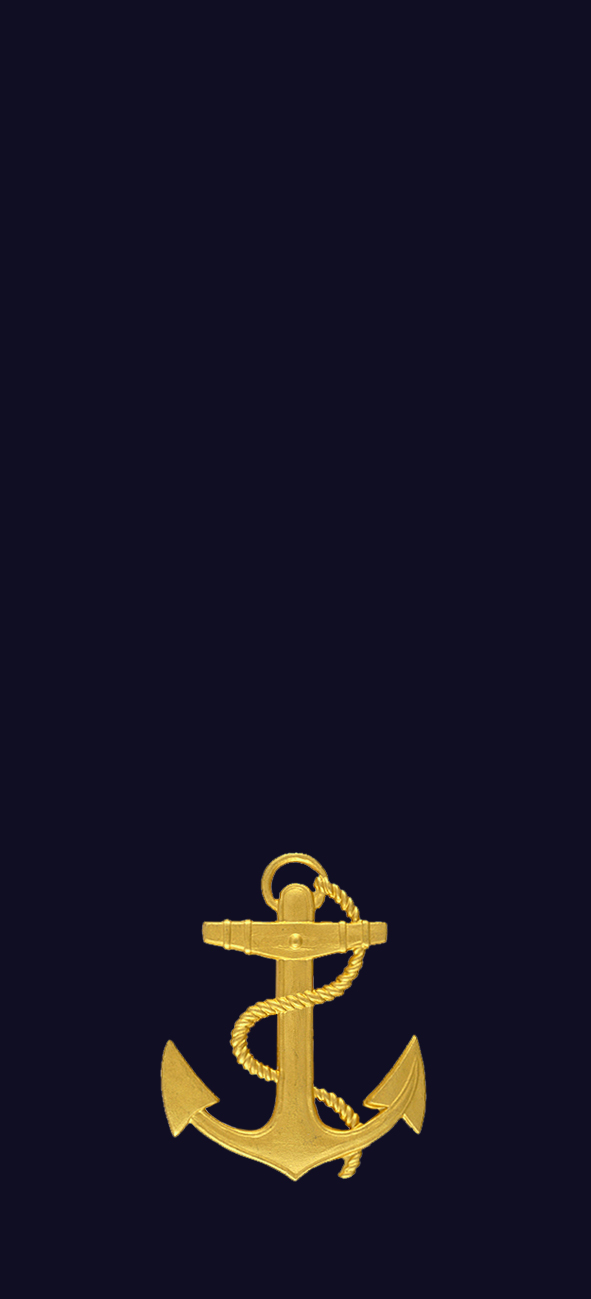
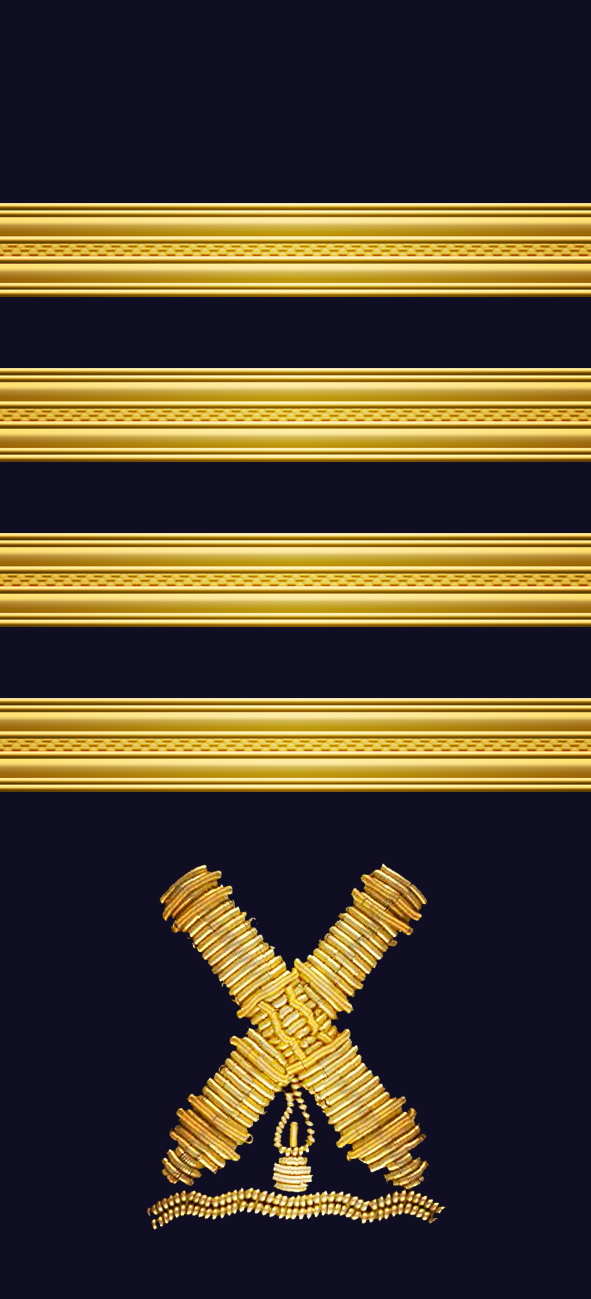
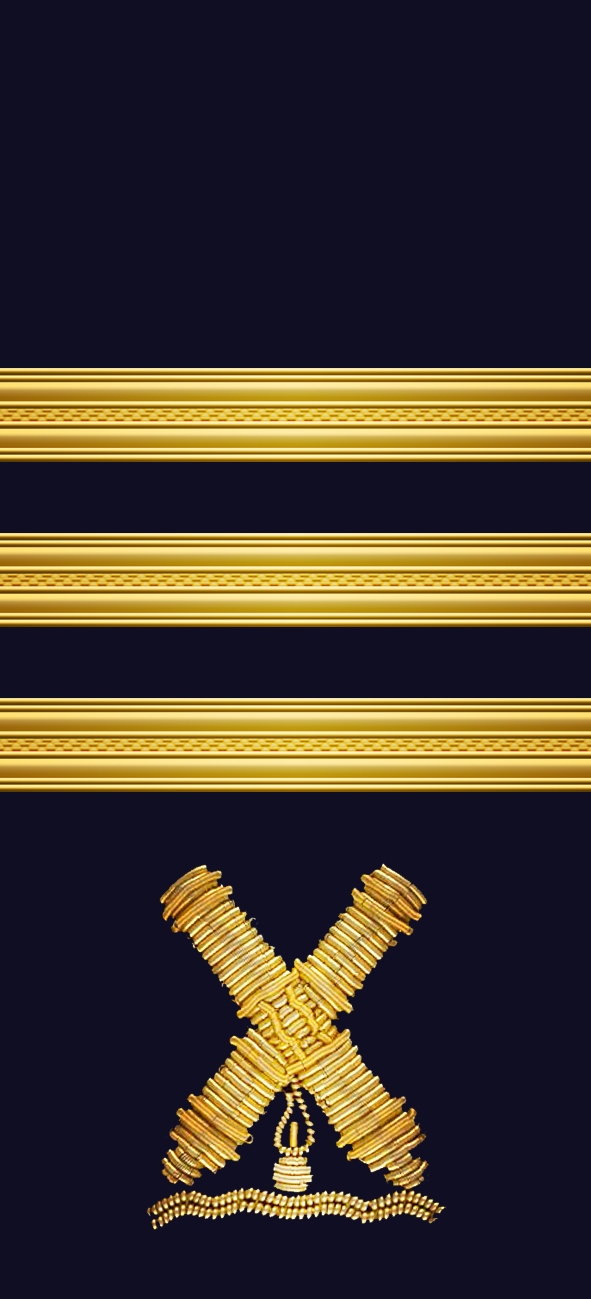
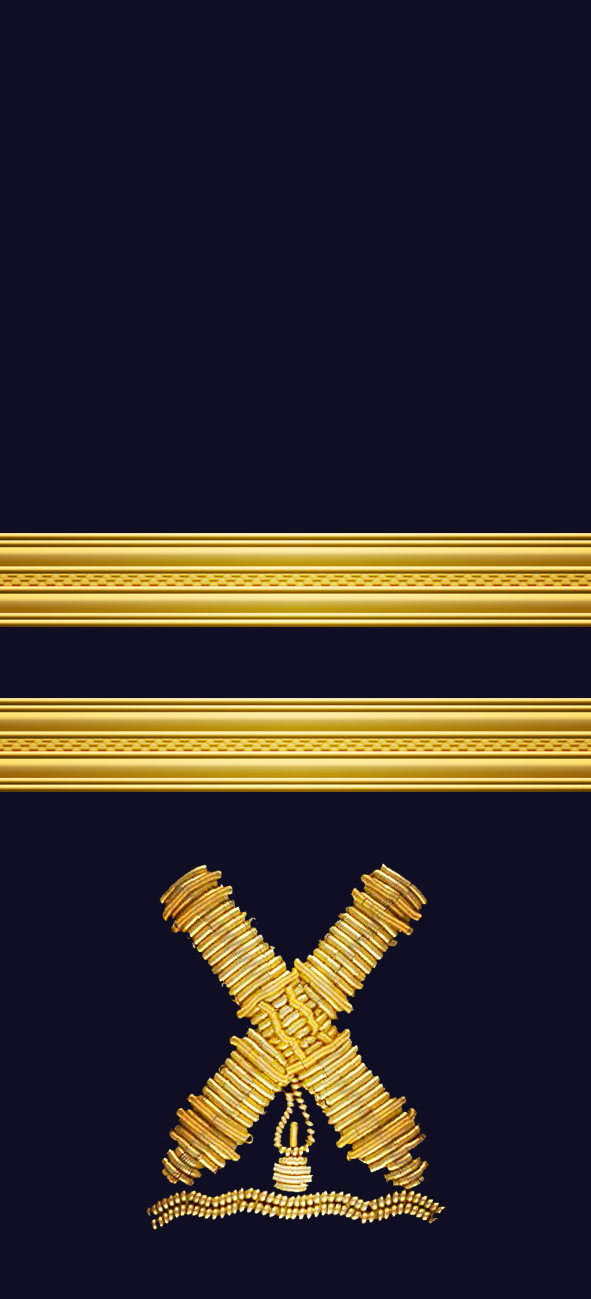
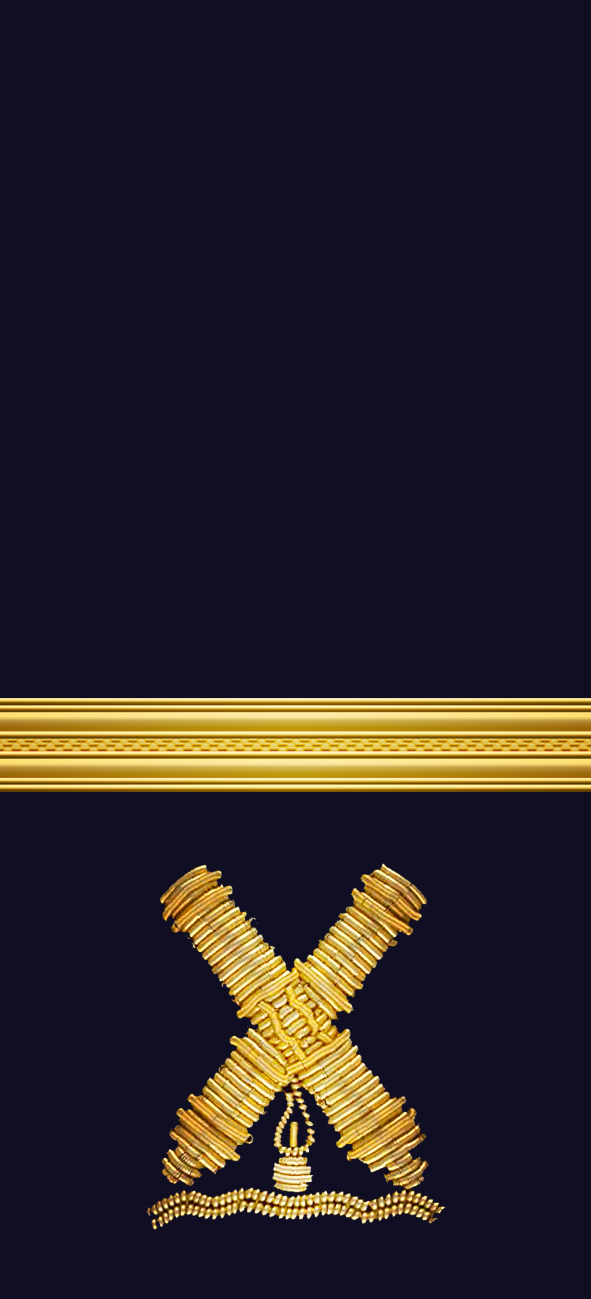
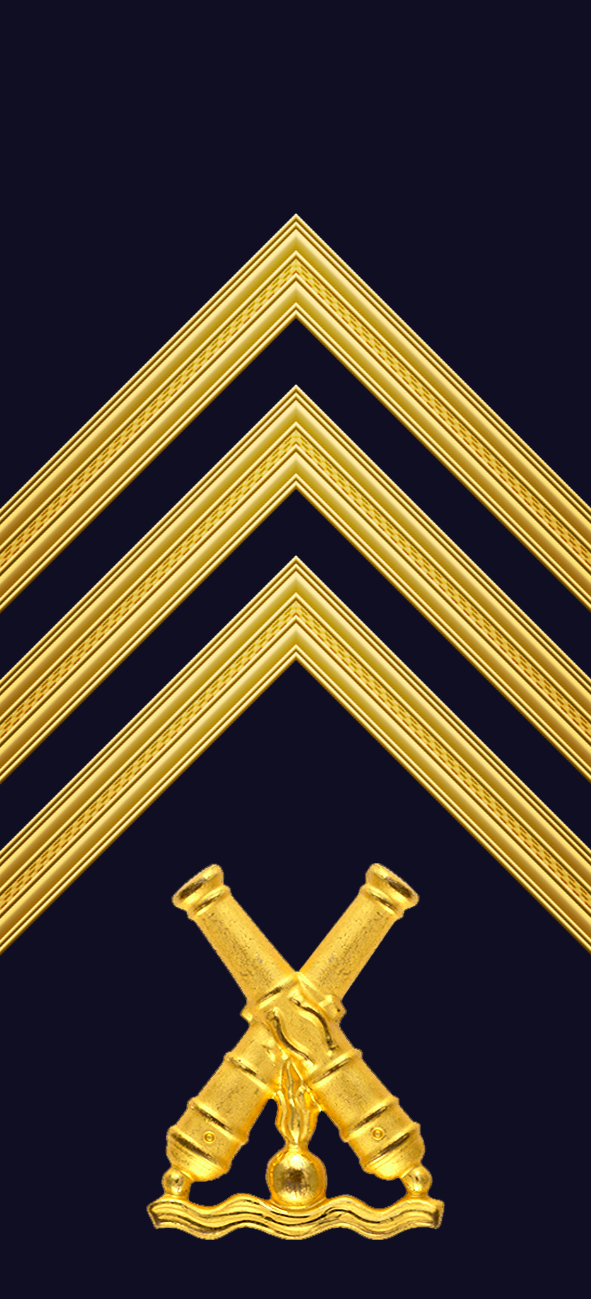
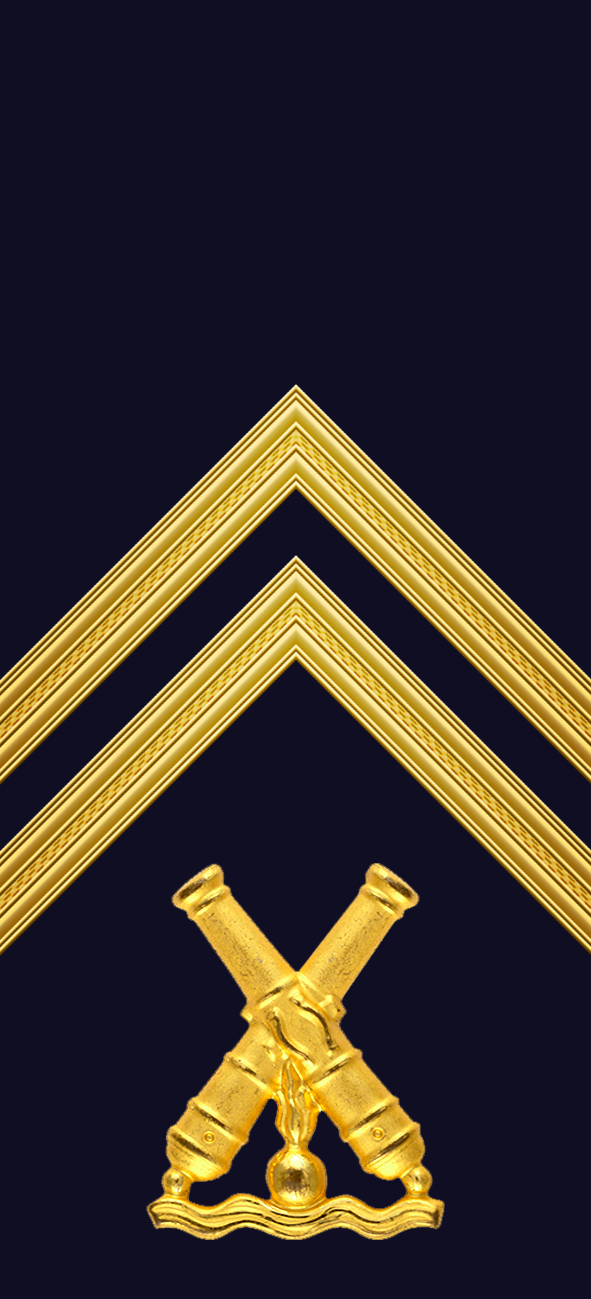
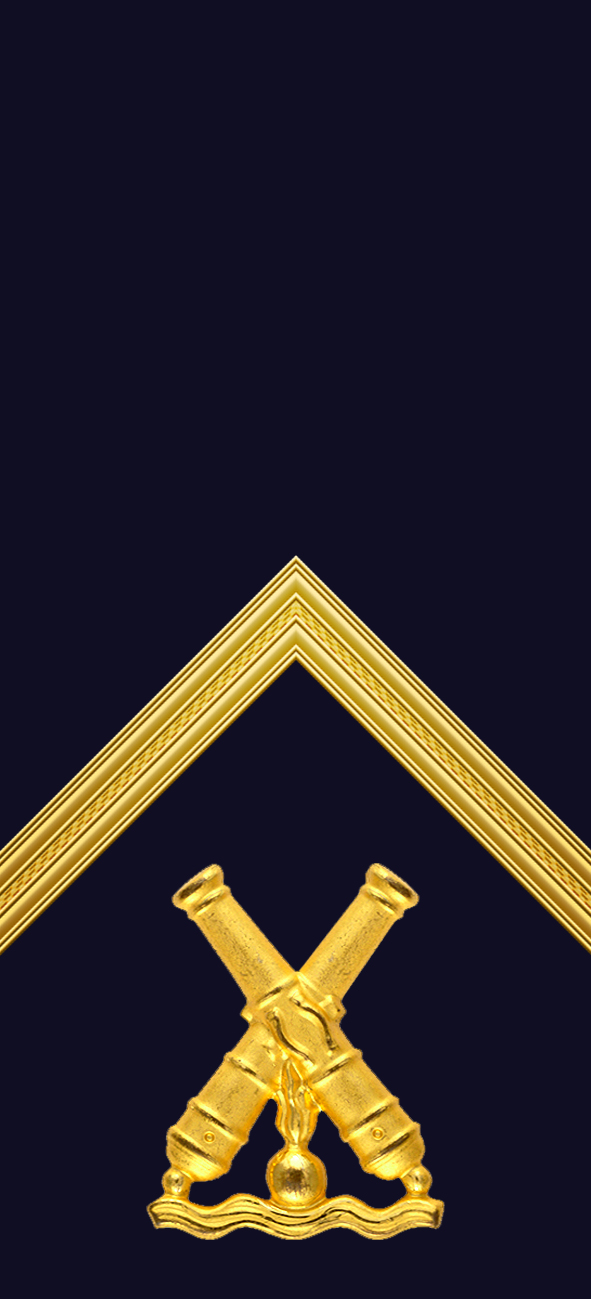
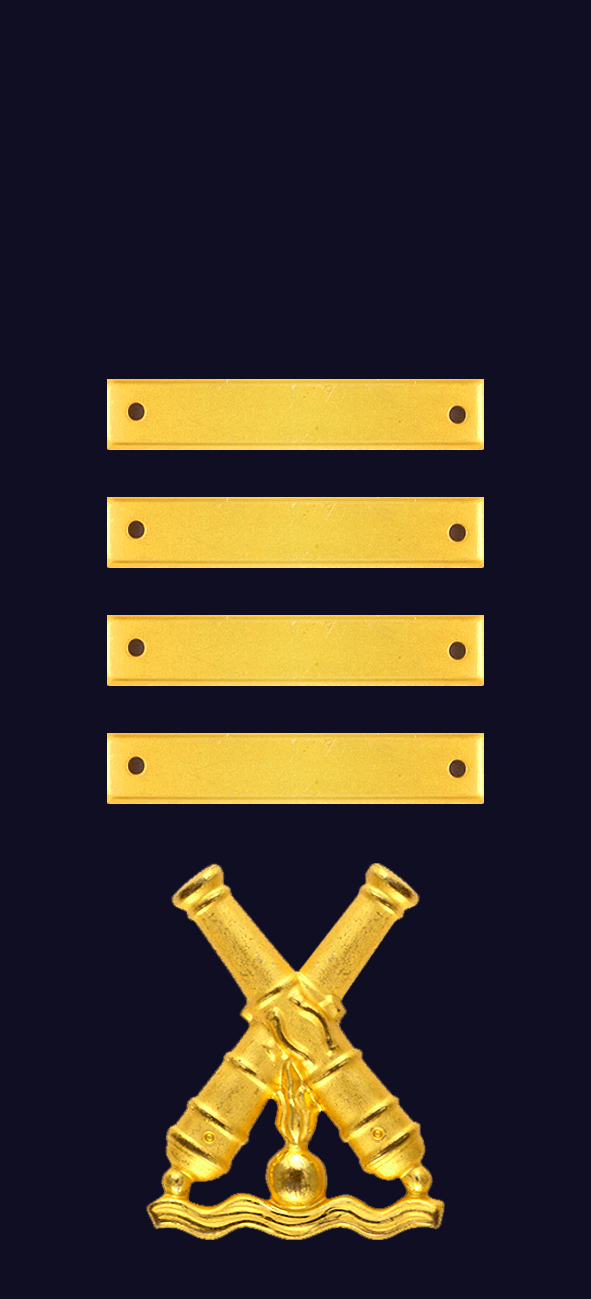
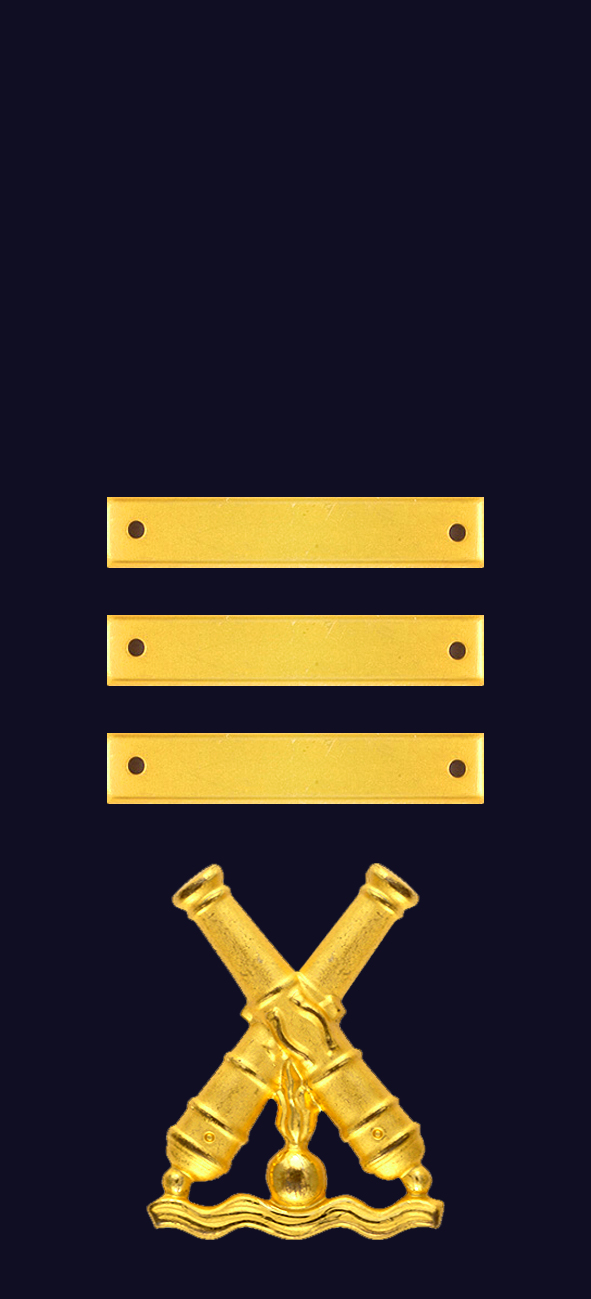
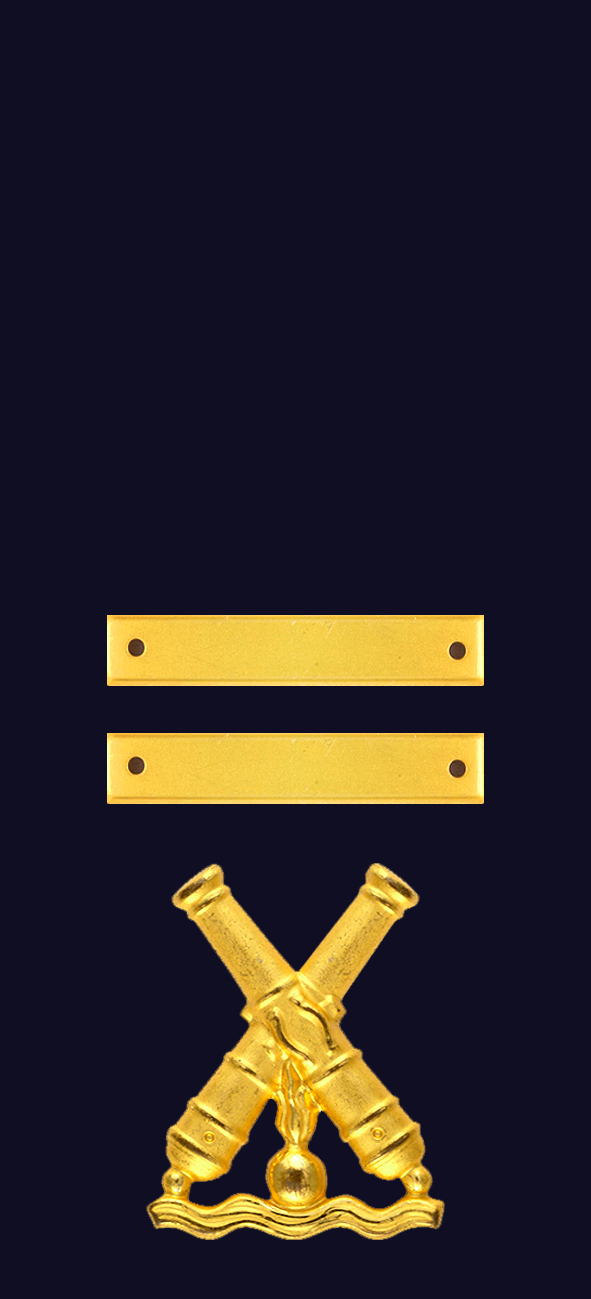
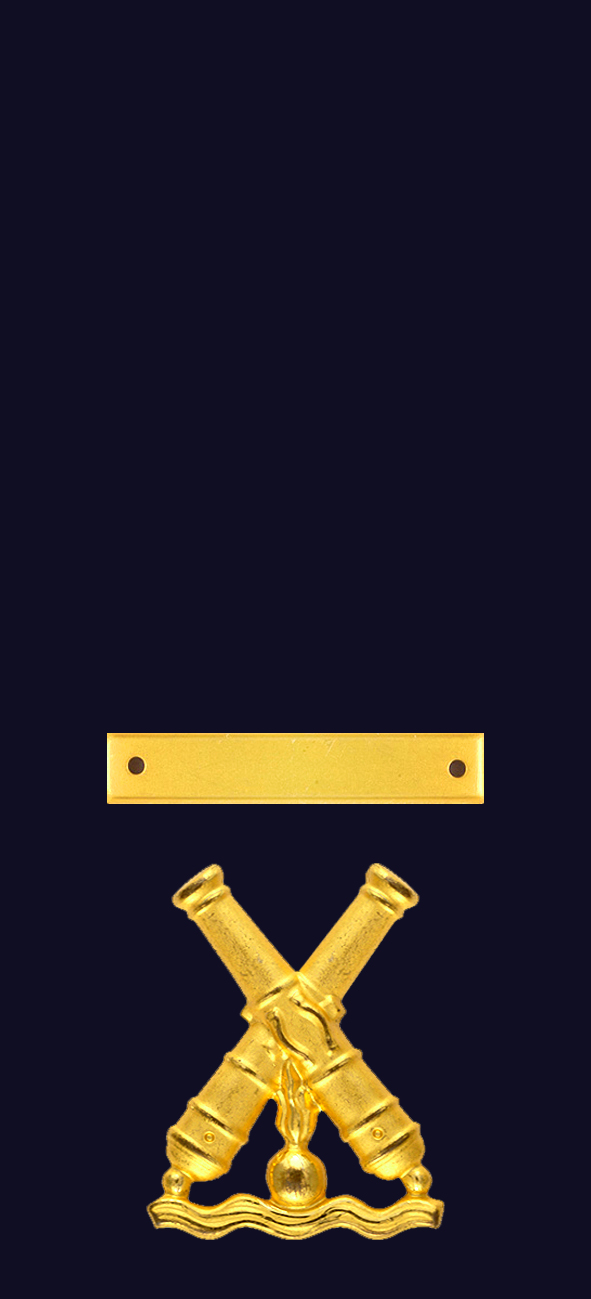
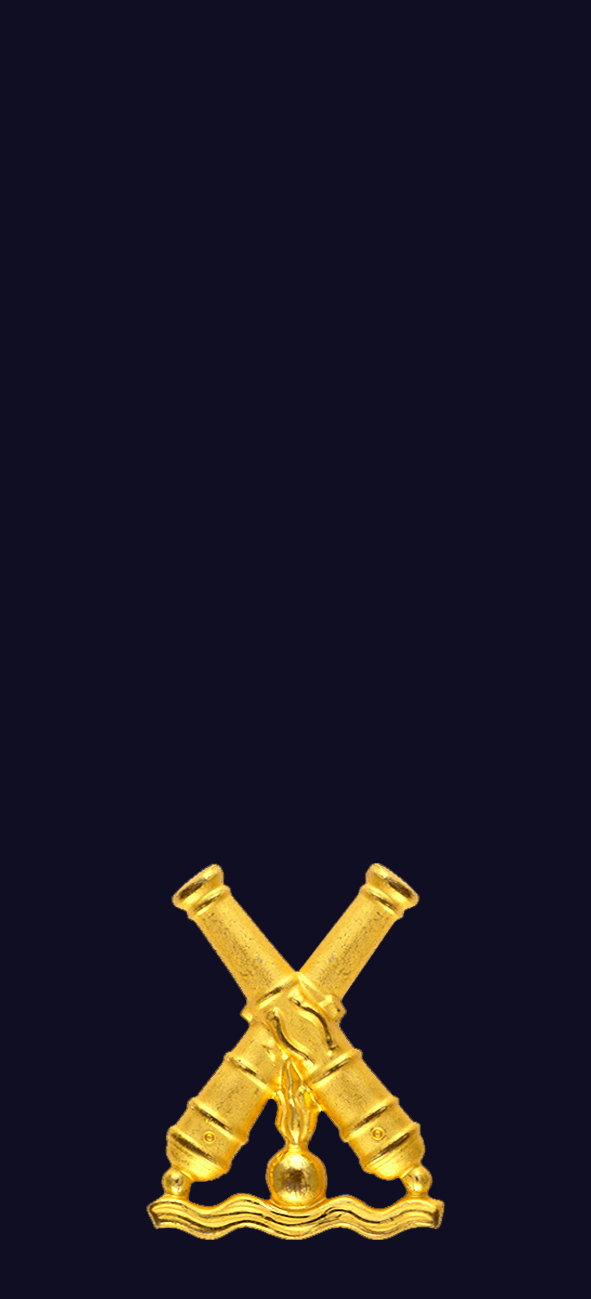
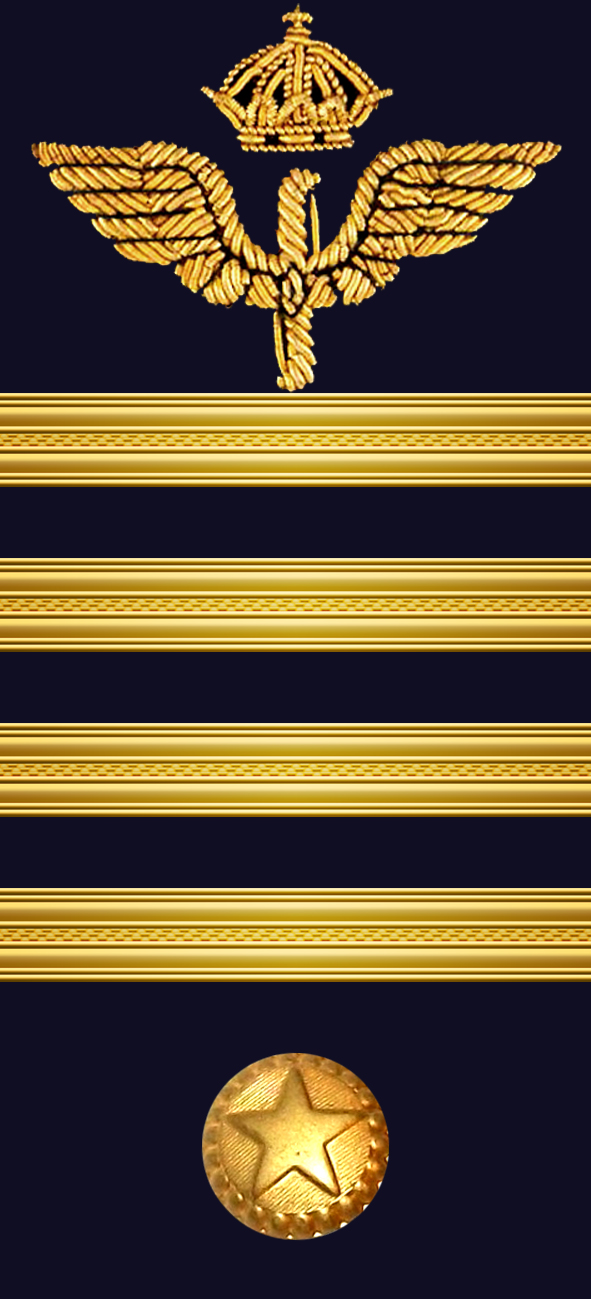
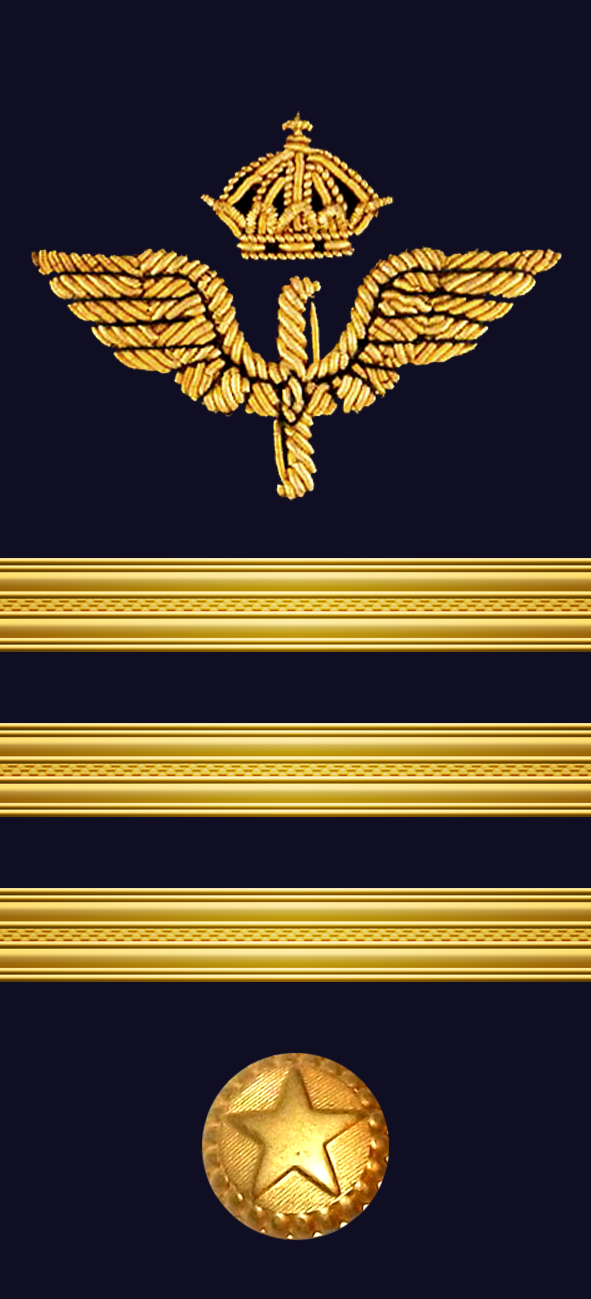
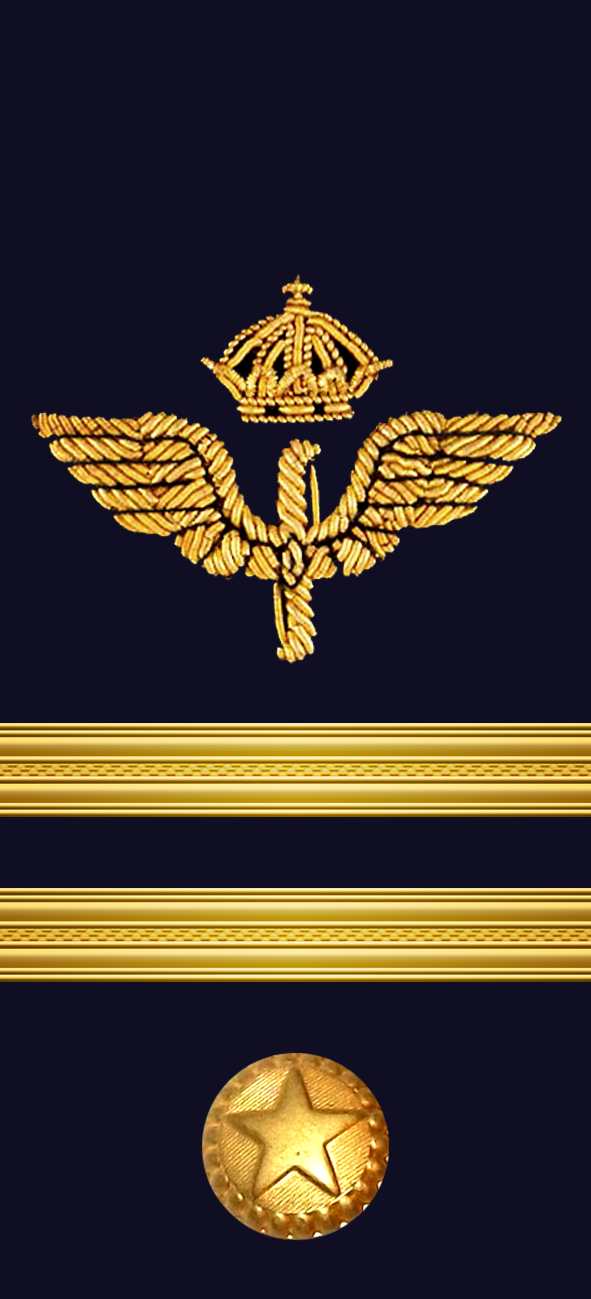
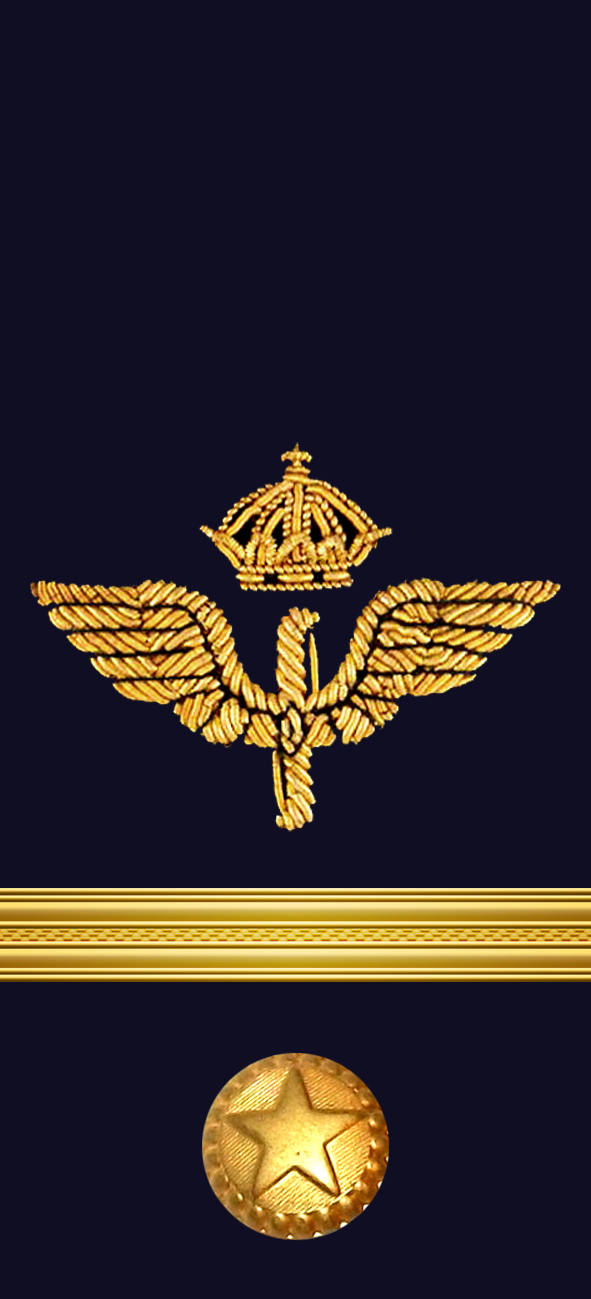
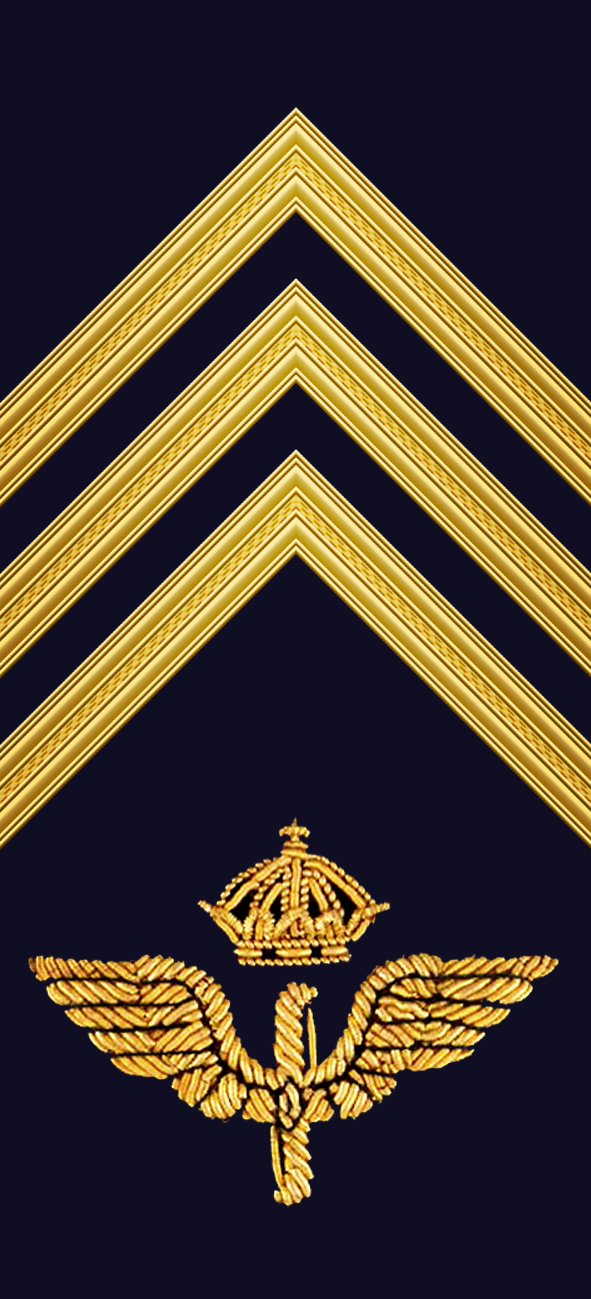
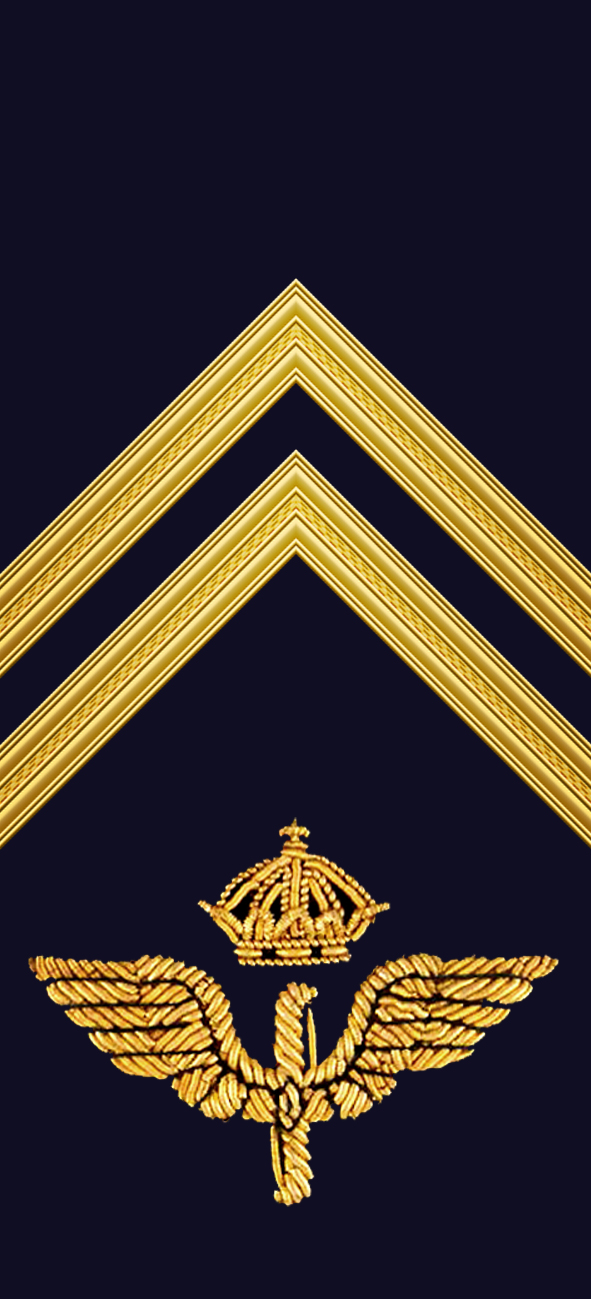
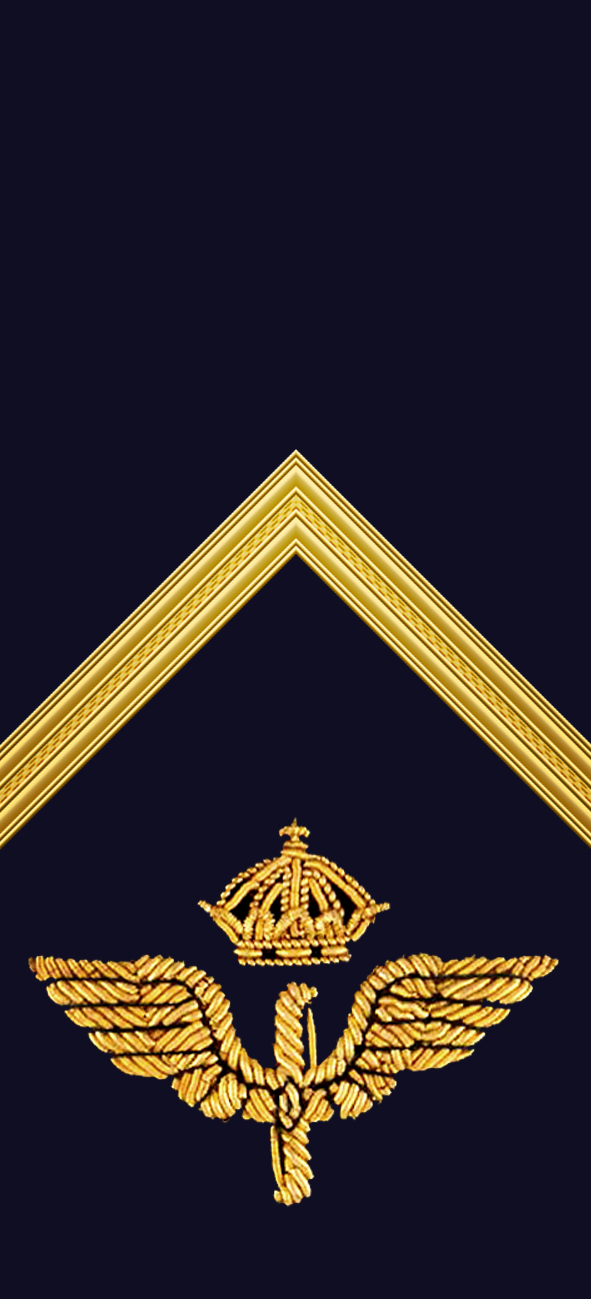
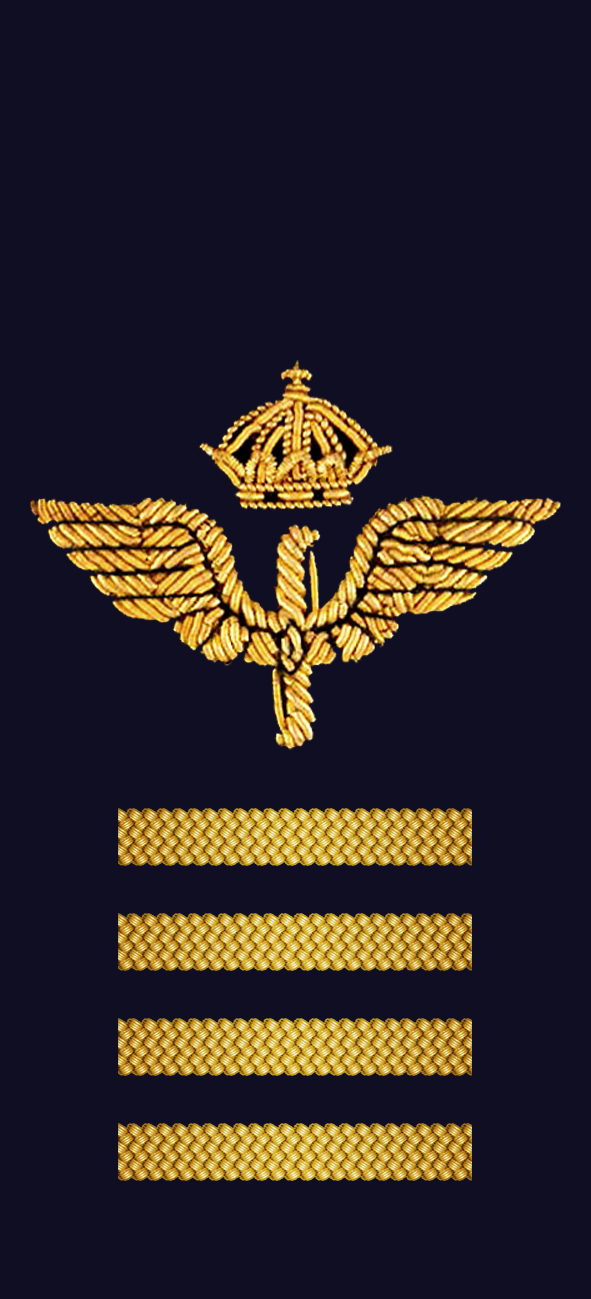
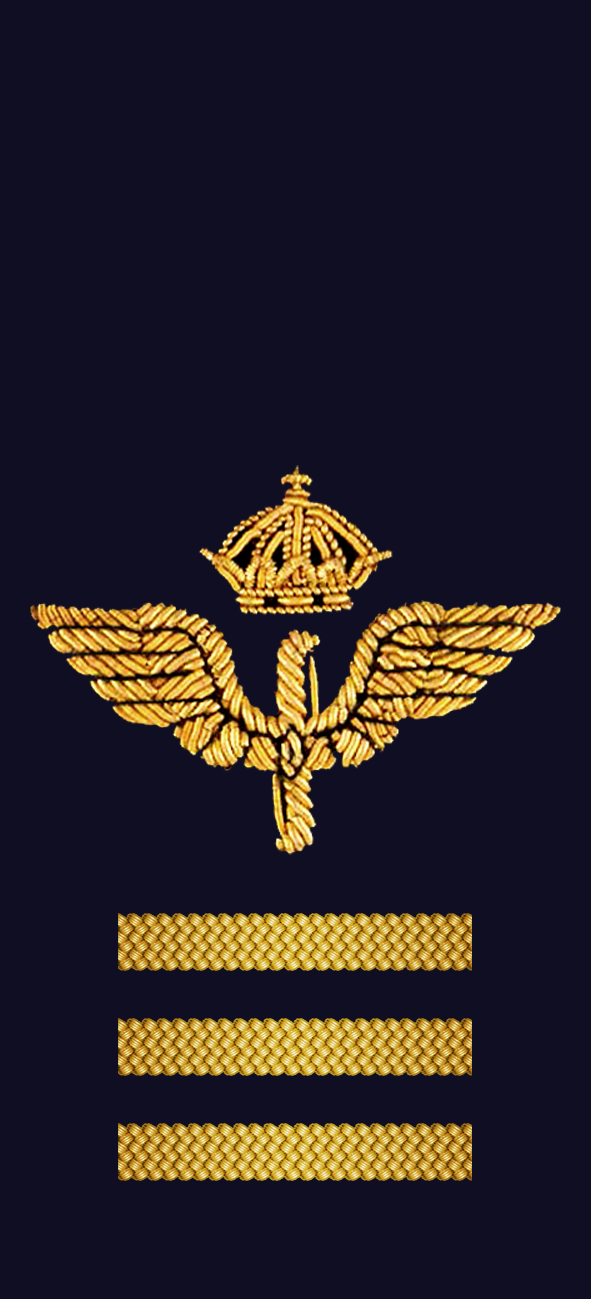
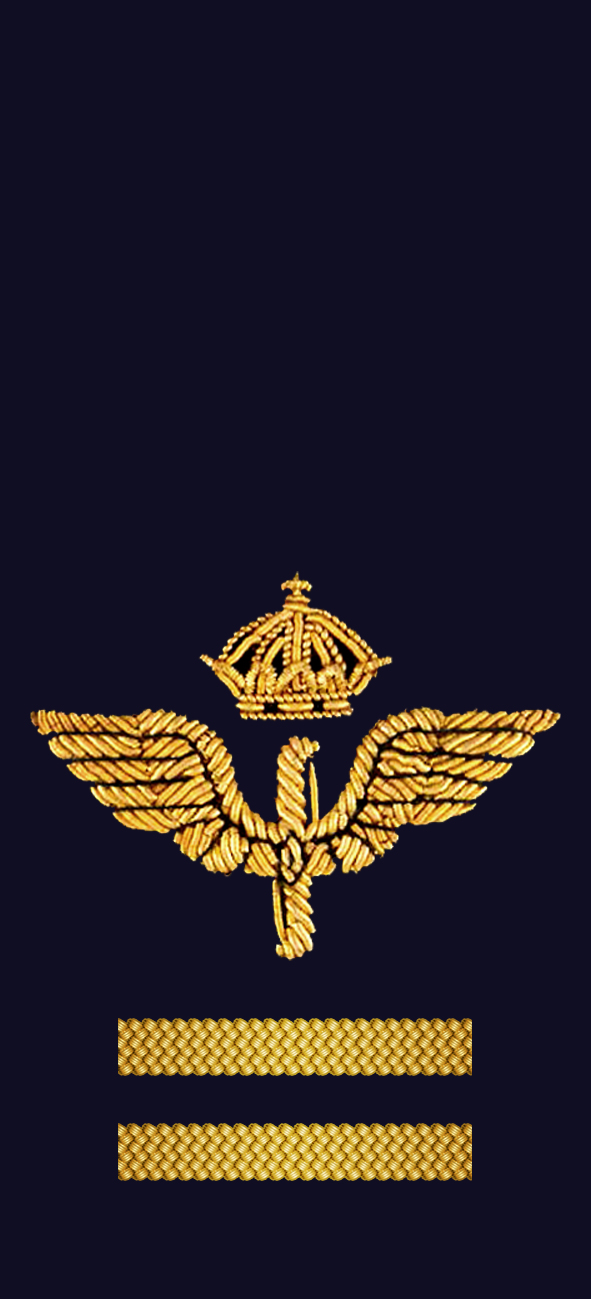
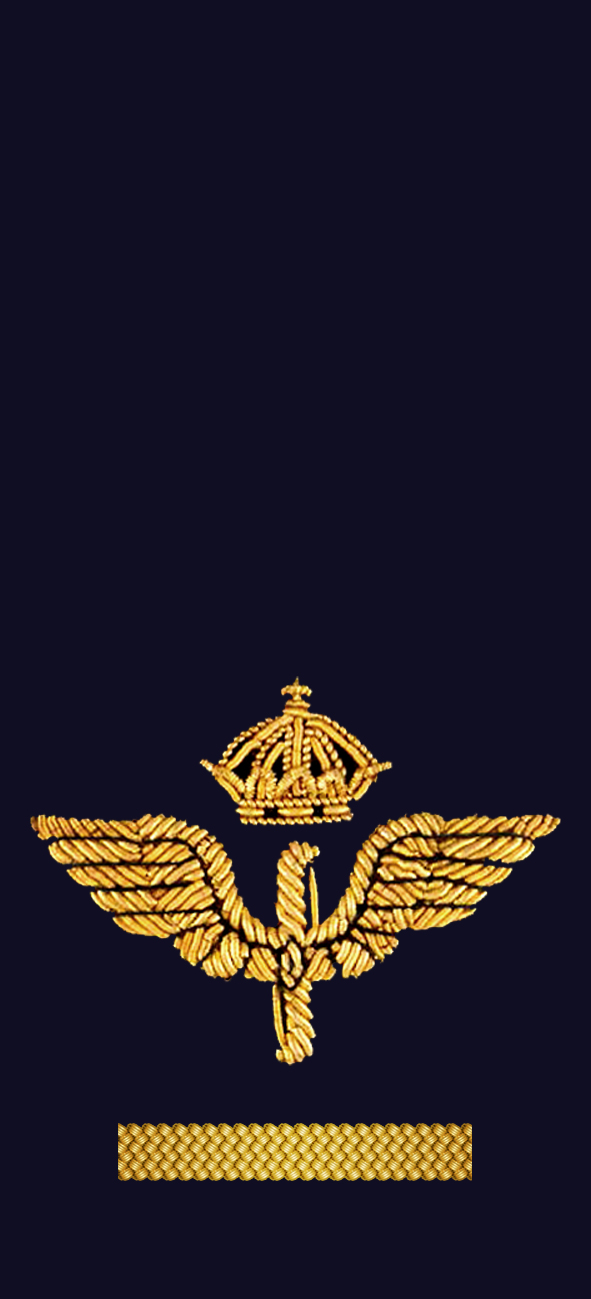
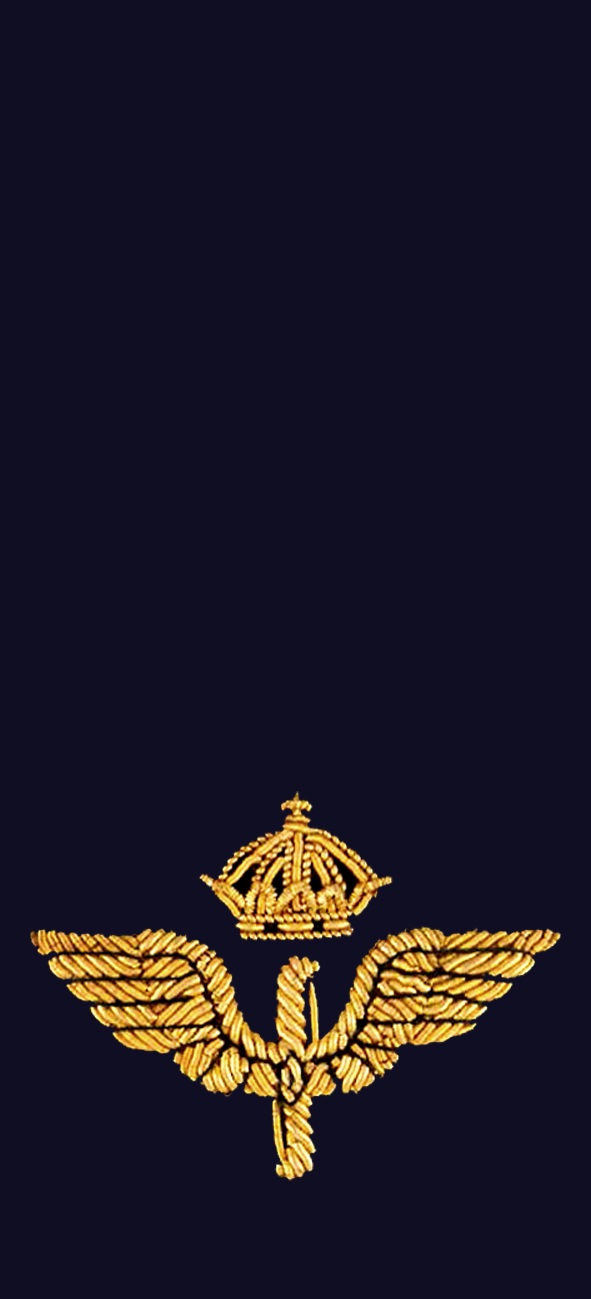
Rank group	Senior NCOs					Junior NCOs		Enlisted
Swedish Army (2009–2019)							No insignia
Swedish Army (2009–2019)								Menig 4 / Menig 3 / Menig 2 / Menig 1
Swedish Army (2009–2019)	Regementsförvaltare	Förvaltare	Fanjunkare	Förste Sergeant	Sergeant	Korpral	Vicekorpral	Menig 4 / Menig 3 / Menig 2 / Menig 1	Menig
Swedish Navy (2009–2019)								Sjoman 4 Sjoman 3 Sjoman 2 Sjoman 1
Swedish Navy (2009–2019)	Flottiljförvaltare	Förvaltare	Fanjunkare	Förste Sergeant	Sergeant	Korpral	Vicekorpral	Sjoman 4 Sjoman 3 Sjoman 2 Sjoman 1	Sjoman
(Sweden) Swedish Amphibious Corps (2009–2019)								Menig 4 Menig 3 Menig 2 Menig 1
(Sweden) Swedish Amphibious Corps (2009–2019)	Regementsförvaltare	Förvaltare	Fanjunkare	Förste Sergeant	Sergeant	Korpral	Vicekorpral	Menig 4 Menig 3 Menig 2 Menig 1	Menig
Swedish Air Force (2009–2019)								Menig 4 Menig 3 Menig 2 Menig 1
Swedish Air Force (2009–2019)	Flottiljförvaltare	Förvaltare	Fanjunkare	Förste Sergeant	Sergeant	Korpral	Vicekorpral	Menig 4 Menig 3 Menig 2 Menig 1	Menig
Swedish Home Guard (2009–2019)								No insignia
Swedish Home Guard (2009–2019)		Förvaltare	Fanjunkare	Förste Sergeant	Sergeant	Korpral		Menig 1	Menig
Rank group	Senior NCOs					Junior NCOs		Enlisted

Branch insignia worn by OR-1 in the Army
Infantry	Cavalry	Artillery	Armour	Air-Defense	Engineer	Signal	Supply	Army (generic)

=== Ranks 1983–2009 ===
A major change in the personnel structure in 1983 (NBO 1983), merged the three professional corps of platoon officers, company officers, and regimental officers into a one-track career system within a single corps called professional officers (yrkesofficerare). The three messes were also merged to one.

Officers

Rank group	General / flag officers				Senior officers				Junior officers
									National Service Officers Värnpliktsofficerare
	Professional Officers (one-track officer system) Yrkesofficerare (enhetsbefäl)
Swedish Army (1983–2009)
Swedish Army (1983–2009)	General	Generallöjtnant	Generalmajor	Brigadgeneral	Överste av 1. graden	Överste	Överstelöjtnant	Major	Kapten	Löjtnant	Fänrik	Kadett; 2nd year (Note: Equivalent to OR-5)	Kadett; 1st year (Note: Equivalent to OR-4)

Others

Rank group	Senior NCOs					Junior NCOs	Enlisted
	National Servicemen Värnpliktiga
Swedish Army (1983–2009)							No insignia
Swedish Army (1983–2009)	Fanjunkare	Sergeant	Kadett (Note: Specialist school where aspirants graduate as Sergeant (Specialist Officer) (introduced 2008).)	Överfurir (Note: No new permanent appointments to these ranks after 1990.)	Furir	Korpral (Note: Rank used whilst training for promotion to Furir.)	Menig (Note: Privates wear insignia of branch. In this case the infantry.)

=== Ranks 1972–1983 ===
In 1972 the personnel structure changed, reflecting increased responsibilities of warrant and non-commissioned officers, renaming the underofficerare as kompaniofficerare, giving them the same ranks as company grade officers (fänrik, löjtnant, kapten). Underbefäl was renamed plutonsofficerare and given the rank titles of sergeant and fanjunkare, although their relative ranks were now placed below fänrik. The commissioned officers were renamed regementsofficerare, beginning with löjtnant. The three-track career system was maintained, as well as three separate messes.

	Regimental Officers (Regementsofficerare Officers)
							National Service Officers (Värnpliktsofficerare)			National Servicemen (Värnpliktiga)
							Company Officers (Kompaniofficerare Limited Duty Officers)			Platoon Officers (Plutonsofficerare NCO)
Regular ranks
Regular ranks	General; Amiral	General- löjtnant Viceamiral	General- major Konter- amiral	Överste; 1gr Kommendör; 1gr	Överste; Kommendör	Överste- löjtnant Kommendör- kapten	Major; Örlogs- kapten	Kapten	Löjtnant	Fänrik	Fanjunkare	Sergeant		Överfurir	Furir	Menig
Trainee ranks
Trainee ranks												Kadett 3	Kadett 2	Kadett 1		Korpral

=== Ranks 1957–1972 ===
National Servicemen (Värnpliktiga)						National Service W.O. (Värnpliktiga underofficerare)			National Service Officers (Värnpliktiga officerare)
		Underbefäl (NCO)				Underofficerare (Warrant Officers)			Officerare (Commissioned Officers)
Regular ranks
Trainee ranks	Menig Vicekorpral	Korpral	Furir	Överfurir	Rustmästare	Sergeant Kadett1-2	Fanjunkare	Förvaltare	Fänrik	Löjtnant	Kapten	Major; Örlogs- kapten	Överste- löjtnant Komendör- kapten	Överste; Komendör	General- major Konter- amiral	General- löjtnant Viceamiral	General; Amiral

Note that the rank of Fältmarskalk (Field Marshal) was a de jure rank before the reform of 1972, even though it has not been used since 1824.

=== Field uniform model 1958/1959 - rank structure of 1960 ===
	Officerare								
Rank insignia on collar patch									
Rank	General	Generallöjtnant	Generalmajor	Överste	Överstelöjtnant	Major	Kapten; Ryttmästare	Löjtnant	Fänrik

	Underofficerare			Kadetter		Underbefäl					Meniga
Rank insignia on collar patch											
Rank	Förvaltare	Fanjunkare; Styckjunkare	Sergeant	Sergeant; Senior Year at Karlberg	Sergeant; Junior Year at Karlberg	Rustmästare	Överfurir	Furir	Korpral; Konstapel	Vicekorpral; Vicekonstapel	Menig; Infantry

=== Uniform model 1939 - rank structure of 1949 ===
In 1949 the relative rank of the warrant officers were elevated further so that to the following effect:

1. The lowest warrant officer, sergeant, had relative rank just below the lowest officer rank, fänrik.
2. The second warrant officer rank, fanjunkare, had relative rank between fänrik and löjtnant.
3. The highest warrant officer rank, förvaltare, had relative rank between first lieutenant and captain.

	Officerare								
Badge m/46 to field cap									
Rank insignia									
Rank	General	Generallöjtnant	Generalmajor	Överste	Överstelöjtnant	Major	Kapten; Ryttmästare	Löjtnant	Fänrik

	Underofficerare			Kadetter	Underbefäl					Meniga
Badge to field cap	m/46	m/46	m/46		m/46-57	m/46-52	m/46-52	m/46-52	m/46-52	
Rank insignia										
Rank	Förvaltare	Fanjunkare; Styckjunkare	Sergeant	Sergeant; Junior Year at Karlberg	Rustmästare; 1957	Överfurir	Furir	Korpral; Konstapel	Vicekorpral; Vicekonstapel	Menig

=== Uniform model 1939 ===
	Officerare								
Badge m/40 to field cap									
Rank insignia m/39									
Rank	General	Generallöjtnant	Generalmajor	Överste	Överstelöjtnant	Major	Kapten; Ryttmästare	Löjtnant	Fänrik

	Underofficerare			Manskap				
Badge m/40 to field cap								
Rank insignia m/39								
Rank	Förvaltare	Fanjunkare; Styckjunkare	Sergeant	Överfurir created 1942	Furir	Korpral; Konstapel	Vicekorpral; Vicekonstapel	Menig

=== Uniform model 1923 ===
In a reform 1926 the relative rank of the then senior warrant officer, fanjunkare, was increased to be equal with the junior officer rank underlöjtnant and above the most junior officer rank fänrik.

	Officerare									
Cap m/23										
Rank insignia										
Rank insignia on greatcoat										
Rank	General	Generallöjtnant	Generalmajor	Överste	Överstelöjtnant	Major	Kapten; Ryttmästare	Löjtnant	Underlöjtnant; Abolished 1937	Fänrik Also a crown in silver on each lower sleeve until 1937.

	Underofficerare			Manskap			
Cap m/23							
Rank insignia							
Rank insignia on greatcoat							
Rank	Fanjunkare; Styckjunkare with relative rank as Underlöjtnant	Fanjunkare; Styckjunkare	Sergeant	Furir	Korpral; Konstapel	Vicekorpral	Menig

=== Uniform model 1910 ===
When an army based on national service (conscription) was introduced in 1901 all commissioned officers had ranks that were senior to the warrant officers (underofficerare) and non-commissioned officers (underbefäl).

	Officerare								
Badge m/14 for fur cap									
Badge m/10-14 for hat									
Rank insignia m/10									
Rank	General	Generallöjtnant	Generalmajor	Överste	Överstelöjtnant	Major	Kapten; Ryttmästare	Löjtnant	Underlöjtnant Fänrik 1915

	Underofficerare		Manskap			
Badge m/14 for fur cap			-			
Badge m/10-14 for hat						
Rank insignia m/10						
Rank	Fanjunkare; Styckjunkare	Sergeant	Distinktionskorpral; Förste konstapel Furir 1915	Korpral; Konstapel	Vicekorpral	Menig
