= Hilding Kring =

Swedish Army officer (1899–1971)

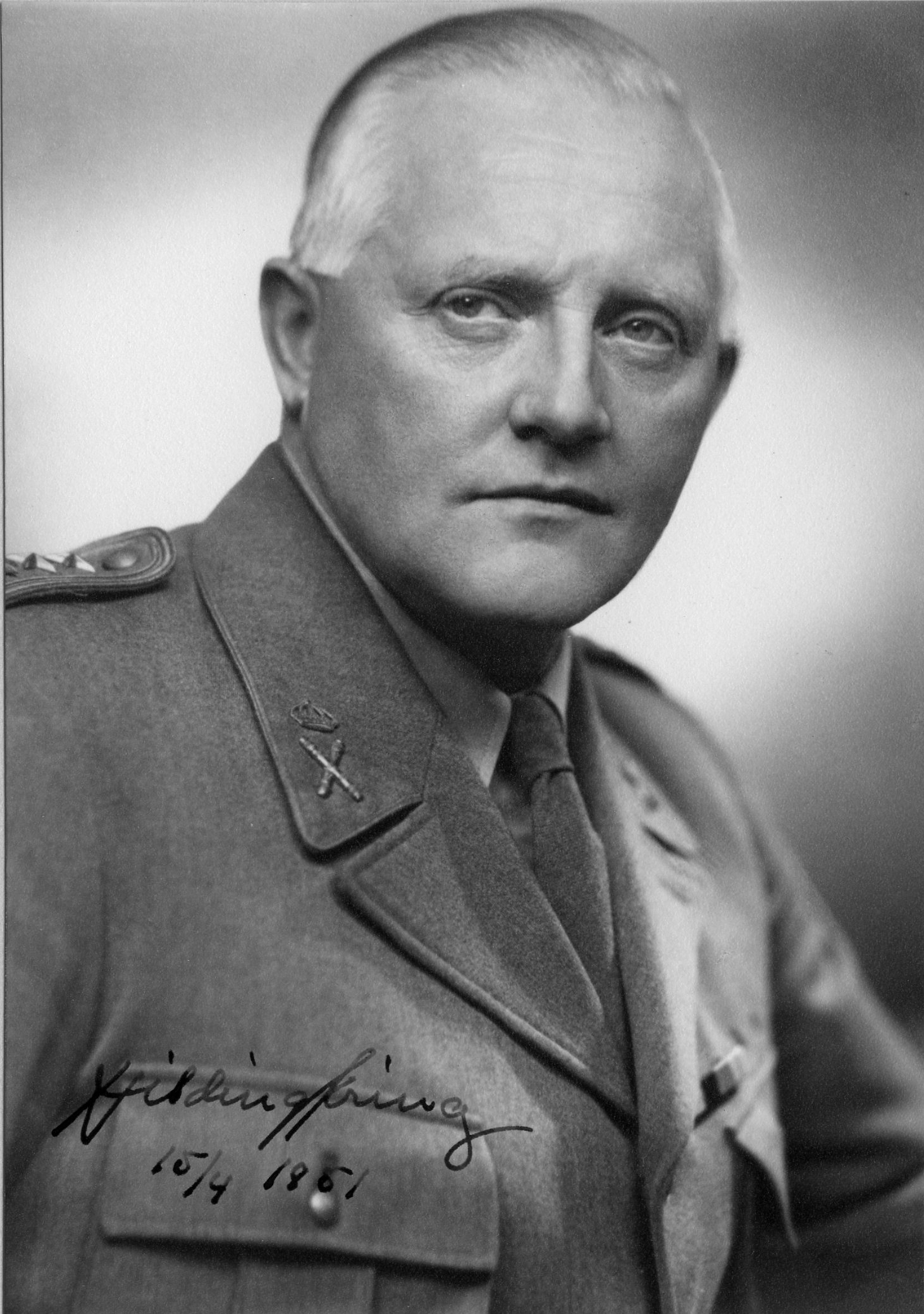
- Kring in 1951.
- Born: Knut Georg Hilding Kring; 24 April 1899; Färila, Sweden
- Died: 22 September 1971 (aged 72); Täby, Sweden
- Military career
- Allegiance: Sweden
- Branch: Swedish Army
- Service years: 1920–1964
- Rank: Lieutenant General
- Commands: Royal Swedish Army Staff College; Småland Artillery Regiment; Commandant, Boden Fortress; Inspector, Army Signal Troops; VII Military District; Quartermaster-General; Swedish Army Quartermaster Corps; Royal Swedish Army Supply Administration; Quartermaster Administration

Lieutenant General Knut Georg Hilding Kring (24 April 1899 – 22 September 1971) was a Swedish Army officer. His senior commands include Commandant in Boden Fortress, Inspector of the Army Signal Troops, military commander of the VII Military District, Quartermaster-General of the Swedish Army and head of the Swedish Army Quartermaster Corps and Vice Chief of the Royal Swedish Army Supply Administration and commanding officer of the Quartermaster Administration of the Swedish Armed Forces.

== Early life ==
Kring was born on 24 April 1899 in Färila, Sweden, the son of fanjunkare Eric Kring and his wife Alma (née Jonzon).

== Career ==
Kring was commissioned as an officer in Uppland Artillery Regiment (A 5) in 1920 with the rank of second lieutenant. Kring was promoted to lieutenant in 1925, served as a répétiteur at the Artillery and Engineering College from 1926 to 1928, and served in the Svea Artillery Regiment (A 1) in 1928. He then served as captain in the General Staff in 1933 and as a teacher at the Artillery and Engineering College from 1934 to 1937. Kring served in the Gotland Artillery Corps (A 7) in 1937 and was head of the Communications Department in the Defence Staff from 1939 to 1945. He was also a member of the National Swedish Transport Commission (Statens trafikkommission) from 1939 to 1945 and the Board for the Wartime Protection of Power Stations (Krigsskyddsnämnden för kraftanläggningar) from 1942 to 1945, as well as of the 1942 Aviation Investigation (1942 års flygutredning) and the 1942 Investigation for Protective Measures of Power Stations (1942 års utredning för skyddsåtgärder vid kraftanläggningar).

Kring was promoted to major in 1940 and to lieutenant colonel in 1942. He was promoted to colonel in 1945 and served in the Småland Artillery Regiment (A 6) the same year. Kring became colonel in the General Staff Corps in 1946 and served as head of the Royal Swedish Army Staff College from 1946 to 1949. He was then regimental commander of Småland Artillery Regiment from 1949 to 1951 and served as Commandant in Boden Fortress from 1951 to 1954. During this time, Kring also served as acting military commander of the VI Military District from 1951 to 1954. He served as Inspector of the Swedish Army Signal Troops from 1954 to 1955 when he was promoted to major general. Kring's next appointment was as military commander of the VII Military District in Gotland from 1955 to 1957. He was a member of the National Swedish Board of Economic Defence from 1957 to 1964 and he served as the Quartermaster-General of the Swedish Army and Vice Chief of the Royal Swedish Army Supply Administration from 1957 to 1963. In 1963, Kring was appointed head of the Quartermaster Administration of the Swedish Armed Forces, serving until 1964 when he retired from active service and was promoted to lieutenant general.

== Personal life ==
In 1933, he married Anna Wetterling (1898–1998), the daughter of Sven Wetterling and Ida Högström. They had one daughter, Britta (born 1935).

== Death ==
Kring died on 22 September 1971 and was buried on 27 October 1971 in Djursholm Cemetery.

== Dates of rank ==
- 1920 – Second lieutenant
- 1922 – Underlöjtnant
- 1925 – Lieutenant
- 1933 – Captain
- 1941 – Major
- 1942 – Lieutenant colonel
- 1949 – Colonel
- 1955 – Major general
- 1964 – Lieutenant general

== Awards and decorations ==
=== Swedish ===
- (Sweden) Commander Grand Cross of the Order of the Sword (6 June 1962)
- (Sweden) Knight of the Order of the Polar Star
- (Sweden) Knight of the Order of Vasa
- (Sweden) Home Guard Medal of Merit in Gold (6 June 1959)
- (Sweden) Swedish Central Federation for Voluntary Military Training Medal of Merit in silver
- (Sweden) Swedish Naval Volunteers' Gold Medal (Sjövärnskårens guldmedalj)

=== Foreign ===
- (Denmark) Commander Second Class of the Order of the Dannebrog
- (Denmark) King Christian X's Liberty Medal
- (Norway) Commander of the Order of St. Olav (1 July 1950)
- (Norway) King Haakon VII Freedom Cross
- (Finland) Order of the Cross of Liberty, 3rd Class with swords
- (Nazi Germany) 2nd Class of the Order of the German Eagle

== Honours ==
- Member of the Royal Swedish Academy of War Sciences (1943)

== Bibliography ==
- Kring, Hilding; Hallgren, Yngve (1933). Fältartilleriets teknik och taktik. Skrifter / Militärlitteraturföreningens förlag, 99-0578882-4; 168 (in Swedish). Stockholm. SELIBR 1349146.

Military offices
Preceded by Gustaf Dyrssen	Defence Staff's Communications Department; 1939–1945	Succeeded by Carl von Horn
Preceded by Richard Åkerman	Royal Swedish Army Staff College; 1946–1949	Succeeded by Carl Fredrik Lemmel
Preceded by Fernando Odenrick	Boden Fortress; 1951–1954	Succeeded by Stig Harry Gerlach
Preceded by Åke Sundberg	Inspector of the Army Signal Troops; 1954–1955	Succeeded by Fale Burman
Preceded by Thord Bonde	VII Military District; 1955–1957	Succeeded by Regner Leuhusen
Preceded by Ivar Gewert	Quartermaster-General of the Swedish Army; Swedish Army Quartermaster Corps; 1957–1963	Succeeded by Folke Diurlin
Preceded by Ivar Gewert	Vice Chief of the Royal Swedish Army Supply Administration; 1957–1963	Succeeded by None
Preceded by None	Quartermaster Administration; 1963–1964	Succeeded by Sam Myhrman
