= Quartermaster general =

Staff officer in charge of supplies for a whole army

A quartermaster general is the staff officer in charge of supplies for a whole army and is in charge of quartermaster units and personnel, i.e. those tasked with providing supplies for military forces and units.

== Germany ==
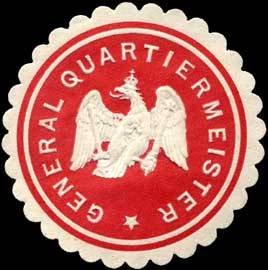
Quartermaster General (Prussia)

In the Imperial German Army, while a Quartiermeister was a non-commissioned officer in charge of supplies, a Generalquartiermeister did not deal with supplies, but with operational command. He was the most senior officer below an Army's Chief of Staff.

For example, during the First World War, Erich Ludendorff was Generalquartiermeister to the German Second Army in August 1914. With his expert knowledge of the plans for the assault on Liege, which he had helped to draw up, he was sent to supervise that assault and took personal charge when the brigade commander was killed.

More famously, when Paul von Hindenburg, after Erich Falkenhayn's dismissal, was appointed Chief of the General Staff at the Oberste Heeresleitung (OHL or "Supreme Army Command") in August 1916, Ludendorff, who had been his chief of staff in the East, came with him. Ludendorff declined to be known as "Second Chief of the General Staff" and instead chose the title Erster Generalquartiermeister (First Quartermaster-General) – in which role he directed the operations of the German army and wielded power over German politics and industry.

== Pakistan ==
The Quartermaster General (QMG) of the Pakistan Army is responsible for overseeing the supply and logistics functions of the army. This includes managing the procurement, storage, and distribution of equipment, supplies, and services required to support the army's operations and troops. The QMG is also responsible for managing the army's transportation and transportation infrastructure, as well as its communication and information systems.

In addition to these operational responsibilities, the QMG may also be involved in planning and overseeing the construction and maintenance of army facilities and infrastructure. The QMG may also play a role in the development and implementation of army-wide policies and procedures related to supply and logistics.

The exact responsibilities of the Quartermaster General may vary depending on the size and structure of the Pakistan Army, as well as the priorities and needs of the organization. However, the QMG is typically considered to be a key member of the army's senior leadership team, responsible for ensuring the army's readiness and ability to carry out its mission.

== Portugal ==
Quartel-mestre-general (Portuguese for quartermaster general) is the traditional designation of the general officer in charge of the administration and supplies of the Portuguese Army. Currently, the designation is assigned to the commanding officer of the Army Logistics Command, who has the rank of lieutenant-general.

== Sri Lanka ==
In the Sri Lanka, the Quarter Master General is a senior general in the Sri Lanka Army General Staff, who heads the Quarter Master General's Branch which is responsible for feeding, transport, movement and construction and maintenance with the Sri Lanka Army.

== Sweden ==
In Sweden, Quartermaster General (generalintendenten, genint) was the head of the Swedish Army Quartermaster Corps.

== United Kingdom ==
In the United Kingdom, the Quartermaster-General to the Forces (QMG) was one of the most senior generals in the British Army. In modern use the QMG is the senior general officer in the army holding a logistics appointment and is currently the lieutenant general holding the post of Chief of Materiel (Land) (CoM(L)) within Defence Equipment & Support. The QMG sits upon the highest committee within the army, the Army Board.

Historically each formation had a Deputy Quartermaster-General (DQMG), Assistant Quartermaster-General (AQMG) or Deputy Assistant Quartermaster-General (DAQMG), depending on its size.

== See also ==
- Military supply
- Quartermaster
- Quartermaster Center and School
- Quartermaster Corps (United States Army)
