= Knut Gillis Bildt =

Swedish Army officer and politician

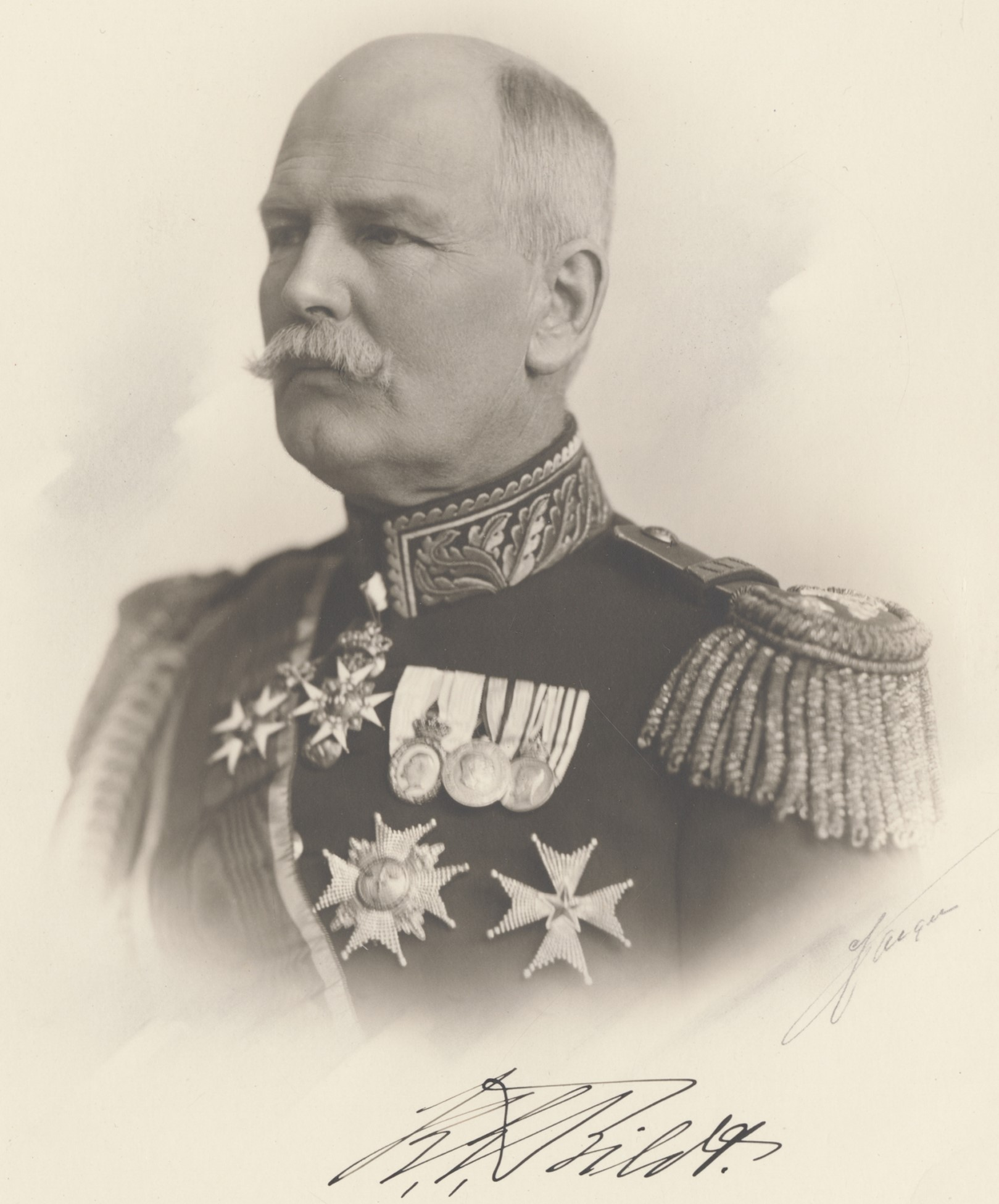
- Born: 13 July 1854; Stockholm, Sweden
- Died: 13 October 1927 (aged 73); Stockholm, Sweden
- Military career
- Allegiance: Sweden
- Branch: Swedish Army
- Service years: 1871–1919
- Rank: General
- Commands: Småland Hussar Regiment; Life Regiment Dragoons; Quartermaster-General; Swedish Army Quartermaster Corps; Chief of the General Staff

General Knut Gillis Bildt (13 July 1854 – 13 October 1927) was a Swedish Army officer and politician. His senior commands include the post of Quartermaster-General of the Swedish Army (1904–1905) and Chief of the General Staff (1905–1919). Bildt was also a member of parliament for Norrbotten County representing the Protectionist Party for eight years.

== Early life ==
Knut Gillis Bildt was born on 13 July 1854 in Stockholm, Sweden, the younger son of the then major, later the Governor of Stockholm and the Prime Minister of Sweden, Friherre Gillis Bildt and his wife Rosa Lucie Dufva. He was the brother of the diplomat, the member of the Swedish Academy etc., Friherre Carl Bildt.

== Career ==
After having passed the cadet course at the Military Academy Karlberg in 1869-71, Bildt was commissioned as underlöjtnant in the Life Regiment Dragoon Corps in 1871 and was three years later promoted to lieutenant there. That same year, the father had become Swedish envoy in Berlin and the son now attended the Prussian Staff College there from 1875 to 1878. After returning home, in 1880 he was transferred to the General Staff, where he became captain in 1883. Since 1883 Bildt belonged to the then Crown Prince Gustaf's staff, for whom he was the chief for a number of years. In 1883 he also was appointed to be a teacher at the Royal Swedish Army Staff College and remained on this post until he, in 1890, advanced to ryttmästare in the Life Regiment Dragoons. In 1891, Bildt was promoted to major in the General Staff was appointed head of its Communications Department.

Bildt was then vice chief of the Military Office of the Ministry of Land Defence from 1892 to 1893. He was moved in 1893 as lieutenant colonel and first major to Småland Hussar Regiment (Smålands husarregemente), where in 1896 he became colonel and regimental commander. He was also head of the Crown Prince's staff from 1896. In 1899, Bildt was elected by Norrbotten County County Council to the Första kammaren, of which he for three years (1900-1902) was a member of the Committee of Supply. Bildt was also a member of the 1907 Special Defense Committee, within which he put in an extremely successful and appreciated work, although he was eventually forced to see a reconciliation proposal adopted, for which he did not consider himself able to give his vote. In the Rikdag the following years, he belonged to those who were eager to urgently deliver on the promise of suffrage extension as a complement to conscription extension, and declared his adherence to the Committee on the Constitution's compromise proposal rather than giving in to the uncertain path of a proportionalist parliamentary memorandum. Bildt was also a member of several committees; the Committee on Sweden's Permanent Defense (Kommittén angående Sveriges fasta försvar) 1897-1898, in the Committee on Field Service Regulations for the Army (Kommittén angående fälttjänstreglemente för armén) in 1899, in the Coastal Artillery Committee (Kustartillerikommittén) in 1899-1900 and in the War Legislative Committee (Krigslagstiftningskommittén) from 1901. He was also a member of the Committee on the State from 1900 to 1902 and in Special Committee (Särskilt utskott) in 1901.

After 1902 having been transported back to the Life Regiment Dragoons as colonel and executive officer (sekundchef), he was promoted to major general in 1904 and appointed Quartermaster-General of the Swedish Army and commanding officer of the Royal Swedish Army Materiel Administration's Quartermaster Department and of the Swedish Army Quartermaster Corps, and appointed the following year to Chief of the General Staff. In 1910, Bildt was promoted to lieutenant general. Bildt's activities in the General Staff, he had presented in Härordningslärans grunddrag : härordningen i allmänhet (1885), which can be said to be an overview of the basic principles of contemporary German war science. Bildt's ideal was an army order with a permanent peace organization of permanent troop units, which during war outbreaks without changeover could occupy the conscripts.

As Chief of the General Staff, Bildt carried out a complete reorganization of the same. Innovation was his business even for the organization of war preparations. In the tactics, Bildt sought to adapt modern views to the country's special conditions, for example through in-depth trials with winter warfare in northern Sweden's mountain and forest terrain, coastal and border defense, operations in the dark, exercises in long-term war and heavy artillery use in mobile warfare, as well as several technical news. Bildt's strong interest in the theory of war was manifested in the General Staff, including when he dedicated to the War History Department the study of Charles XII's war. The result was the famous work Karl XII på slagfältet (1918-1919). Later he published Härordningsfrågor (1922), in which he summed up the teachings of the World War I. In many ways he showed himself there on the position he had taken because of his early studies in Germany. For the value of news, such as the tank weapon and the air force, he did not show a particularly distinct mind.

== Personal life ==
In 1883, Bildt married the maid of honour of the Crown Princess, Baroness Helene Åkerhielm af Blombacka, the daughter of captain, Baron Oscar Åkerhielm and Baroness Fredrique Åkerhielm. In the marriage, Colonel Nils Bildt, who became the grandfather of Carl Bildt, Prime Minister of Sweden 1991–1994, was born.

== Dates of rank ==
- 23 September 1871 – Underlöjtnant
- 1 October 1875 – Lieutenant
- 20 August 1883 – Captain
- 5 October 1891 – Major
- 17 November 1893 – Lieutenant colonel
- 13 November 1896 – Colonel
- 29 January 1904 – Major general
- 28 October 1910 – Lieutenant general
- 14 July 1919 – General

== Awards and decorations ==
=== Swedish ===
- (Sweden) Knight and Commander of the Orders of His Majesty the King (11 July 1919)
- (Sweden) King Oscar II's Jubilee Commemorative Medal (1897)
- (Sweden) Crown Prince Gustaf V and Crown Princess Silver Wedding Medal (1906)
- (Sweden) Commander Grand Cross of the Order of the Sword (6 June 1911)
- (Sweden) Commander 1st Class of the Order of the Polar Star (28 April 1908)

=== Foreign ===
- (Grand Duchy of Baden) Grand Cross of the Order of the Zähringer Lion
- (Denmark) Grand Cross of the Order of the Dannebrog
- (Kingdom of Prussia) Knight 1st Class of the Order of the Crown
- (Kingdom of Saxony) Grand Cross of the Albert Order with golden star
- (Russian Empire) Knight 2nd Class of the Order of Saint Anna
- (Kingdom of Prussia) Knight 3rd Class of the Order of the Red Eagle
- (Saxe-Weimar-Eisenach) Knight 1st Class of the Order of the White Falcon

== Honours ==
- Member of the Royal Swedish Academy of War Sciences (1891)
- Honorary member of the Royal Swedish Society of Naval Sciences (1907)

== Bibliography ==
- Bildt, K. G. (1885). Härordningslärans grunddrag: härordningen i allmänhet (in Swedish). Stockholm: Norstedt. SELIBR 1595770.
- Bildt, K. G. (1893). Konseqvenser: några ord om våra nya härordning (in Swedish) (1st ed.). Stockholm: Norstedt. SELIBR 2331795.
- Bildt, K. G. (1894). Konseqvenser: några ord om vår nya härordning (in Swedish) (2nd ed.). Stockholm: Norstedt. SELIBR 1621478.
- Bildt, K. G. (1922). Härordningsfrågor (in Swedish). Stockholm: Norstedt. SELIBR 1470414.
- Bildt, K. G. (1923). Lant- och sjöförsvar (in Swedish). Linköping: Östgöta-correspondenten. SELIBR 1470416.
- Bildt, K. G. (1925). I försvarsfrågor 1922-1924 (in Swedish). Linköping: Östgöta correspondenten. SELIBR 1470415.

Military offices
Preceded by Richard Berg	Quartermaster-General of the Swedish Army; 1904–1905	Succeeded by Fredrik Holmquist
Preceded by Axel Rappe	Chief of the General Staff; 1905–1919	Succeeded by Lars Tingsten
