= Ivar Gewert =

Swedish Army officer

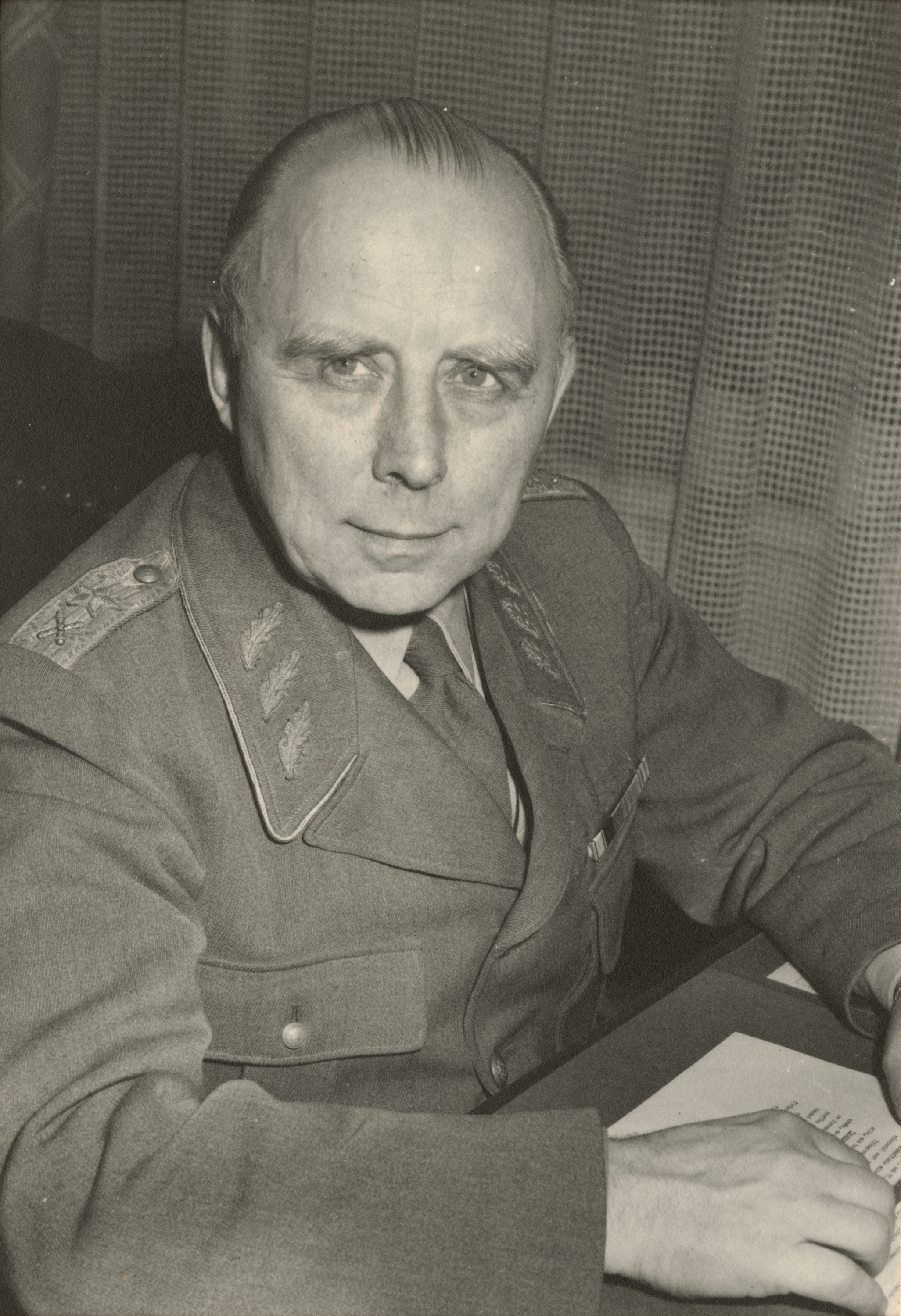
- Gewert in 1956.
- Born: Gustav Ivar Vilhelm Gewert; 4 August 1891; Hällefors, Sweden
- Died: 25 February 1971 (aged 79); Stockholm, Sweden
- Military career
- Allegiance: Sweden
- Branch: Swedish Army
- Service years: 1911–1957
- Rank: Lieutenant General
- Commands: Swedish Army Service Troops; Quartermaster-General; Swedish Army Quartermaster Corps; Royal Swedish Army Supply Administration

Lieutenant General Gustav Ivar Vilhelm Gewert (4 August 1891 – 25 February 1971) was a Swedish Army officer. His senior commands include Inspector of the Swedish Army Service Troops, Quartermaster-General of the Swedish Army and head of the Swedish Army Quartermaster Corps, vice chief of the Royal Swedish Army Materiel Administration and vice chief of the Royal Swedish Army Supply Administration.

== Early life ==
Gewert was born on 4 August 1891 in Hällefors, Sweden, the son of Gustaf Gewert, a factory manager, and his wife Amalia (née Abenius). Gewert passed studentexamen in 1909.

== Career ==
Gewert was commissioned as an officer in the Värmland Regiment (I 22) with the rank of underlöjtnant in 1911. Gewert was promoted to lieutenant in 1915 and to captain in 1920. From 1920, Gewert belonged to the Swedish Army Quartermaster Corps and he served as regimental quartermaster in Dalarna Regiment (I 13) from 1920 to 1923. He was commanding officer of the Intendenturtruppernas studentkompani from 1923 to 1925 and served as adjutant of the Quartermaster-General of the Swedish Army Axel Hultkrantz from 1925 to 1934, when he was promoted to major.

Gewert was promoted to lieutenant colonel in 1936 and served as head of the Equipment Office in the Commissary Department (Intendenturdepartementets utrustningsbyrå) from 1936 to 1942. He was promoted to colonel in 1939. In 1942, Gewert was appointed Inspector of the Swedish Army Service Troops. He was promoted to major general in 1945 and in 1946 he was appointed Quartermaster-General and head of the Swedish Army Quartermaster Corps. Gewert was a member of the Swedish National Board for Economic Defense Preparedness (Riksnämnden för ekonomisk försvarsberedskap) from 1947 to 1957. He served as vice chief of the Royal Swedish Army Materiel Administration from 1949 to 1954. In 1954, he was appointed vice chief in the Royal Swedish Army Supply Administration. Gewert retired three later in 1957 and was then promoted to lieutenant general.

Gewert was editor of the Svensk intendenturtidskrift from 1926 to 1941. He was president of the Royal Swedish Academy of War Sciences from 1957 to 1959, and chairman of the Military Society in Stockholm from 1958 to 1963. He was also chairman of the Officerares Ideella Stödförening ("Officer's Nonprofit Support Association") from 1961 to 1965.

== Personal life ==
In 1920, he married Lisa Nilsson (1892–1985), the daughter of wholesaler Gottfrid Nilsson and Augusta (née Bokelin). They had two children; Marianne (born 1921) and Susanne (born 1927).

== Death ==
Gewert died on 25 February 1971 and was buried at Laxarby Cemetery in Bengtsfors Municipality.

== Dates of rank ==
- 1911 – Underlöjtnant
- 1915 – Lieutenant
- 1920 – Captain
- 1934 – Major
- 1936 – Lieutenant colonel
- 1939 – Colonel
- 1945 – Major general
- 1957 – Lieutenant general

== Awards and decorations ==
Gewert's awards:

=== Swedish ===
- (Sweden) Commander Grand Cross of the Order of the Sword (11 November 1952)
- (Sweden) Knight of the Order of the Polar Star
- (Sweden) Knight of the Order of Vasa

=== Foreign ===
- (Finland) 2nd Class of the Order of the Cross of Liberty with swords
- (Nazi Germany) 1st Class of the Order of the German Eagle
- Knight 1st Class of the Order of the White Rose of Finland

== Honours ==
- Member of the Royal Swedish Academy of War Sciences (1935) (president 1957–1959)

Military offices
Preceded by Axel Bredberg	Inspector of the Swedish Army Service Troops; 1942–1946	Succeeded by Gottfrid Björck
Preceded by Helge Söderbom	Quartermaster-General of the Swedish Army; Swedish Army Quartermaster Corps; 1946–1957	Succeeded by Hilding Kring
Preceded by ?	Vice chief of the Royal Swedish Army Materiel Administration; 1949–1954	Succeeded by None
Preceded by None	Vice chief of the Royal Swedish Army Supply Administration; 1954–1957	Succeeded by Hilding Kring
Professional and academic associations
Preceded by Axel Ljungdahl	President of the Royal Swedish Academy of War Sciences; 1957–1959	Succeeded by Erik Samuelson
