= Helge Söderbom =

Swedish Army officer (1881–1975)

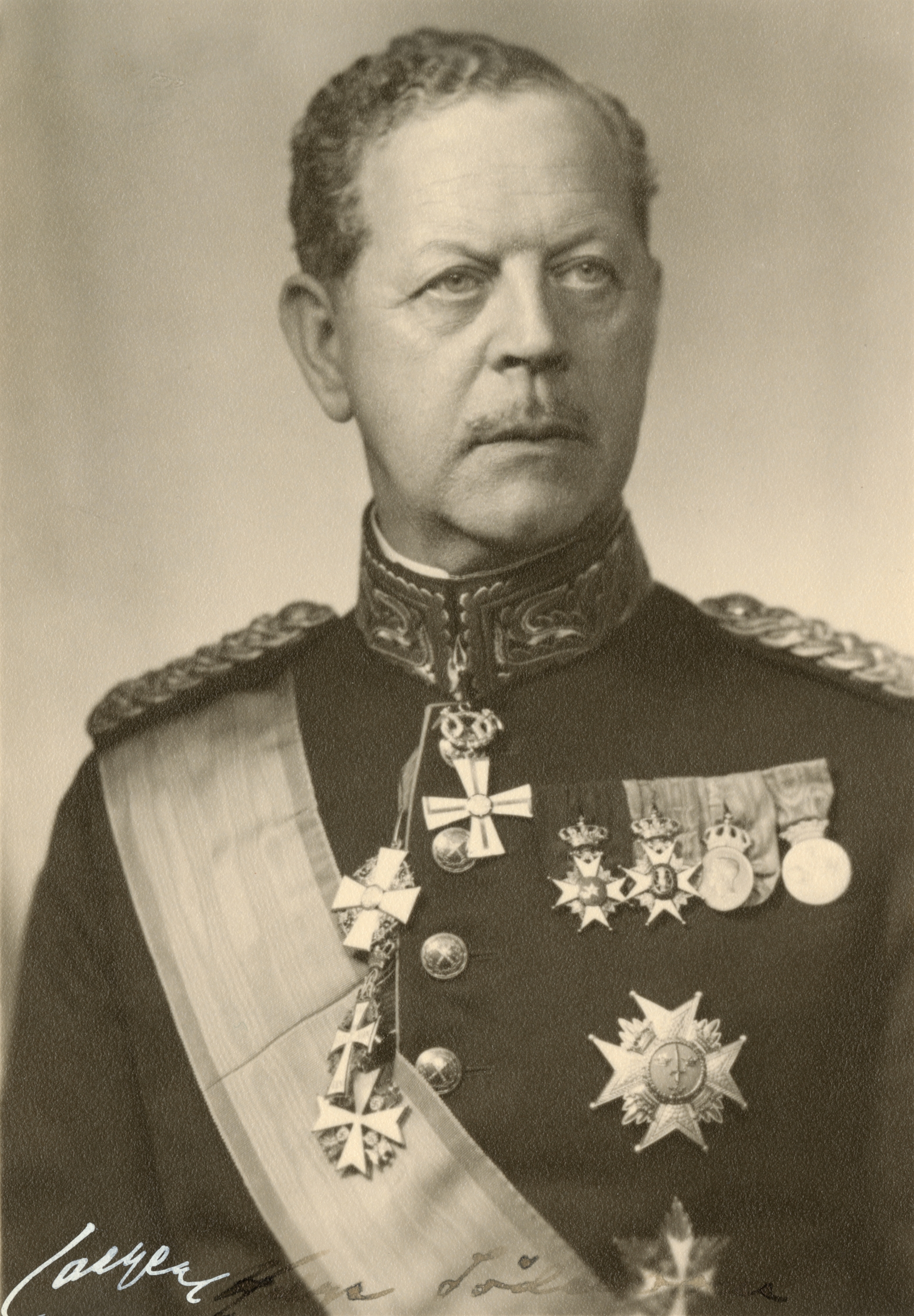
- Born: Johan Helge Fritiof Söderbom; 21 May 1881; Ekeberga, Sweden
- Died: 3 January 1975 (aged 93); Uppsala, Sweden
- Military career
- Allegiance: Sweden
- Branch: Swedish Army
- Service years: 1902–1946
- Rank: Lieutenant General
- Commands: Quartermaster Staff; Quartermaster-General; Swedish Army Quartermaster Corps

Lieutenant General Johan Helge Fritiof Söderbom (21 May 1881 – 3 January 1975) was a senior Swedish Army officer. Söderbom began his military career in 1902 after graduating from the Military Academy Karlberg and was first assigned to the Hälsinge Regiment. He became a qualified quartermaster in 1907 and steadily advanced through roles within the Swedish Army Quartermaster Corps, gaining promotions up to colonel by 1928. In parallel with his military duties, he held key administrative roles, including expert positions in Swedish and Finnish defence reforms and taught at the Royal Swedish Army Staff College. In 1935, he was promoted to major general and appointed Quartermaster-General of the Swedish Army, a position he held until 1946. During World War II, he played a crucial role in overseeing the army’s logistical mobilization and rearmament. He also served as vice chief of the Royal Swedish Army Materiel Administration from 1944 to 1946. Upon retiring, he was promoted to lieutenant general in recognition of his outstanding organizational abilities.

== Early life ==
Söderbom was born on 21 May 1881 in Ekeberga Parish in Lessebo Municipality, Kronoberg County, Sweden and was the son of Janne Söderbom and his wife Anna Ekström. Söderbom passed mogenhetsexamen in Gävle in 1900. His brother Erik Söderbom (1894–1998), was a well-known sports journalist in Scania and chairman of Malmö AIF sports club in Malmö from 1941 to 1943.

== Career ==
=== Sports career ===
Söderbom competed for IFK Gävle, where he was also chairman. In 1899, Söderbom won the Swedish Athletics Championships in the long jump with a jump of 5.73 meters. On 27 May 1900, he improved Gustaf Rundberg's unofficial Swedish record in long jump, from 6.17 to 6.20 meters. He kept the record until 1902, when Frans Frise improved it by six centimeters. At the Swedish Athletics Championships in 1900, he won gold in the 110 meter hurdles (18.0 seconds), long jump (5.66 meters) and triple jump (11.61 meters). Söderbom stopped competing in 1900.

=== Military career ===
Söderbom graduated from the Military Academy Karlberg in Stockholm in 1902 and was commissioned as an officer the same year, assigned to Hälsinge Regiment in Gävle as a underlöjtnant where he was promoted to lieutenant in 1905. He graduated as a finance and supply officer/quartermaster (intendent) in 1907 and was transferred in 1908 to the Swedish Army Quartermaster Corps, where he was appointed underintendent in 1908, intendent av 2. klass in 1909, intendent av 1. klass in 1914 and to captain in 1915. He served as adjutant to the Quartermaster-General of the Swedish Army from 1913 to 1917 and as regimental paymaster (regementsintendent) in the Position Artillery Regiment (Positionsartilleriregementet) from 1917 to 1919 and as head of the Fodder Section in the National Household Commission (Folkhushållningskommissionen) from 1918 to 1920. Following that, he was a teacher in military administration at the Royal Swedish Army Staff College from 1919 to 1924, and was active as a civilian as head of Filmstaden in Råsunda between 1920 and 1921.

Söderbom was an expert assistant in the Defence Inquiry (Försvarsutredningen) from 1920 to 1925, secretary of the Committee on Defence in the Riksdag in 1925, expert for the organization of the economic war preparedness in 1926, secretary in the preparation for the organization of the central defence administration from 1926 to 1927 and expert in administrative matters at the Ministry of Defence in Finland from 1926 to 1928, in which he led the work of reorganizing the administration of the Finnish Defence Forces. He was also chairman of the Quartermaster Department (Intendenturavdelningen) from 1926 to 1935 when he was appointed honorary chairman.

In 1924 Söderbom was promoted to major, after which he was divisional paymaster (fördelningsintendent) in the VI Army Division (VI. arméfördelningen) from 1925 to 1926. He was promoted to lieutenant colonel in 1926 and was head of the Maintenance Bureau at the Quartermaster Department (Intendenturdepartementet) in the Royal Swedish Army Materiel Administration from 1927 to 1928. In 1928 he was promoted to colonel, after which he was head of the Quartermaster Staff (Intendenturstaben) from 1928 to 1935. At this time he was also chairman of the experts for state procurement from 1933 to 1934. He was promoted to major general in 1935, after which he served as Quartermaster-General of the Swedish Army and head of the Swedish Army Quartermaster Corps from 1935 to 1946. In the years 1940–1941, Söderbom was an expert in investigations regarding the future organization of the central military administration. In his capacity as Quartermaster-General of the Swedish Army he was also vice chief of the Royal Swedish Army Materiel Administration from 1944 to 1946. Söderbom retired in 1946 and was then promoted to lieutenant general. His "organizational talent has gained general recognition, not least because during the contingency period 1939-1945 he had to lead the work of the army's quartermaster rearmament and be responsible for the maintenance of the mobilized forces".

=== Business career ===
Söderbom was a member of the board of AB Turitz & Co from 1946 to 1958 and chairman of the board of Börtzells Tryckeri AB and the General Staff's Lithographic Institute from 1947 to 1956.

== Personal life ==
In 1906, Söderbom married Helga Kjöllerström (1881–1974), the daughter of Theodor Kjöllerström and Selma Klinghjerdt. They had one son, Åke Söderbom (1909–2002), a Swedish Army colonel.

== Death ==
Söderbom died on 3 January 1975 in Uppsala Cathedral Parish in Uppsala County.

== Dates of rank ==
- 1902 – Underlöjtnant
- 1905 – Lieutenant
- 1915 – Captain
- 1924 – Major
- 1926 – Lieutenant colonel
- 1928 – Colonel
- 1935 – Major general
- 1946 – Lieutenant general

== Awards and decorations ==
=== Swedish ===
- (Sweden) Commander Grand Cross of the Order of the Sword (6 June 1942)
- (Sweden) Commander 1st Class of the Order of the Sword (25 November 1933)
- (Sweden) Knight of the Order of the Sword (1923)
- (Sweden) Knight of the Order of Vasa (1921)
- (Sweden) Knight of the Order of the Polar Star (1925)
- (Sweden) Home Guard Medal of Merit in gold
- (Sweden) Federation of Landstorm Associations Medal of Merit (1924)
- (Sweden) Stockholm Landstorm Association Medal of Merit (Stockholms landstormsförbunds förtjänstmedalj) (1926)
- (Sweden) Swedish Red Cross Silver Medal

=== Foreign ===
- Grand Cross of the Order of the Lion of Finland
- (Nazi Germany) Order of the German Eagle with Star
- (Denmark) Commander of the Order of the Dannebrog
- (Finland) 1st Class of the Order of the Cross of Liberty with swords
- Commander of the Order of the White Rose of Finland

== Honours ==
- Member of the Royal Swedish Academy of War Sciences (1927)

Military offices
Preceded by Carl August Ryrberg	Quartermaster Staff; 1928–1935	Succeeded by Henning Arntz
Preceded by Axel Hultkrantz	Quartermaster-General of the Swedish Army; Swedish Army Quartermaster Corps; 1935–1946	Succeeded by Ivar Gewert
Preceded by ?	Vice chief of the Royal Swedish Army Materiel Administration; 1944–1946	Succeeded by ?
