= Quartermaster-General of the Swedish Army =

Military appointment of Sweden

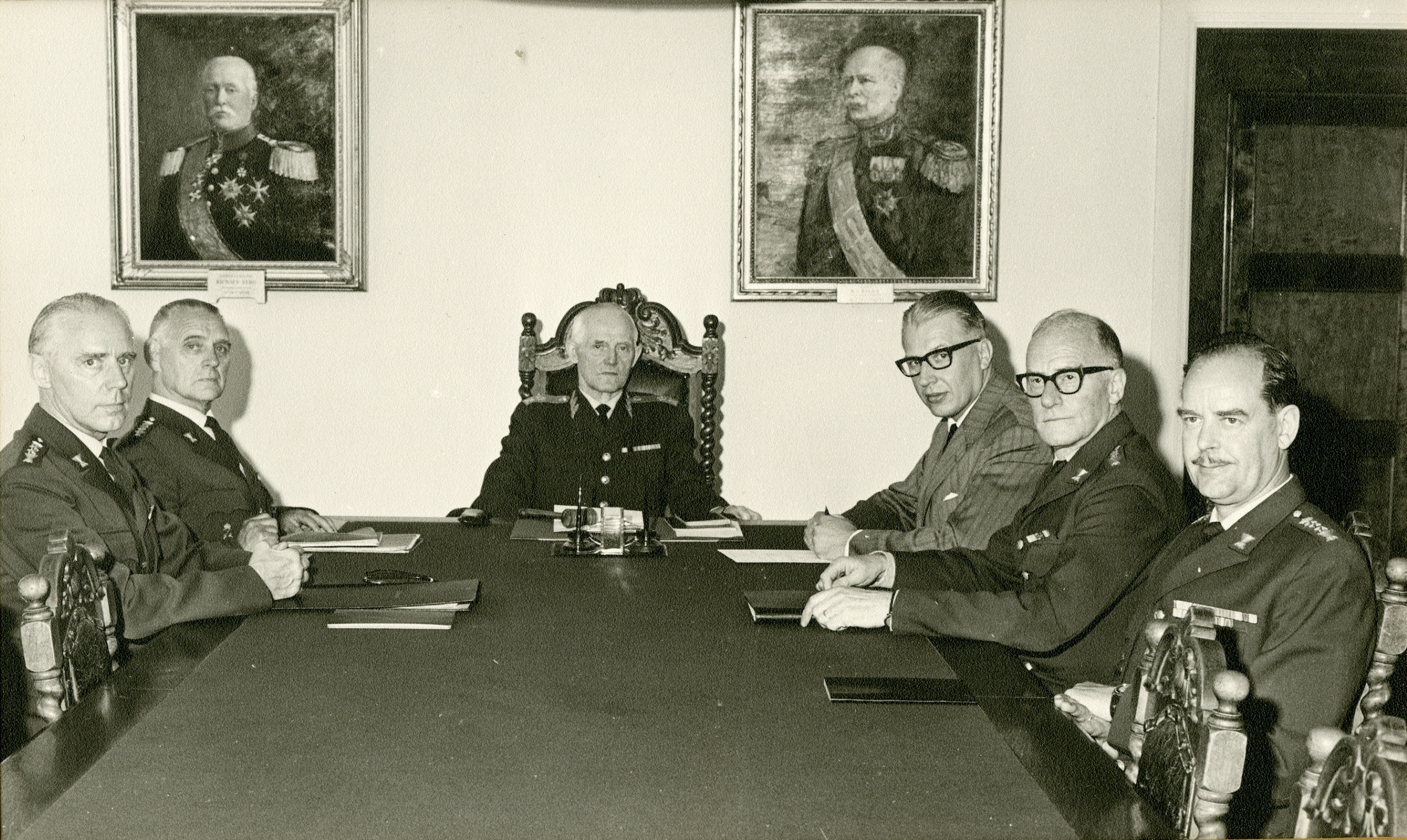
Quartermaster-General, Major General Hilding Kring at the last plenary session of the Royal Swedish Army Supply Administration in June 1963.

The Quartermaster-General of the Swedish Army (Swedish: generalintendenten, genint) was a general officer who was responsible for the Swedish Army Quartermaster Corps, the quartermaster branch of the Swedish Army.

== History ==
In Sweden, the Quartermaster General was the highest commander of an army's commissariat service; between 1796 and 1814 it was the name of the chief of the General War Commissariat (Generalkrigskommissariatet), and between 1850 and 1865 the name of the chief of the Commissary Department in the War College, and finally from 1865 the name of the chief of the Royal Swedish Army Materiel Administration's Quartermaster Department (from 1880 also head of the Swedish Army Quartermaster Corps). The Quartermaster General was responsible for the army's clothing and provisioning, maintenance and remounting, in war also for the General Staff's finances and the accounting thereof.

The Quartermaster General, who commanded the Swedish Army Quartermaster Corps, also commanded the Royal Swedish Army Materiel Administration's Quartermasters Department and he was also, from 1914, the Inspector of the Quartermaster Service Troops (Intendenturtrupperna, Int) and regarding the training of these troops, he had similar duties as other branch inspectors. In his capacity as head of the Swedish Army Quartermaster Corps and Inspector of the Quartermaster Service Troops, he was assisted most closely by personnel of the Quartermaster Staff (Intendenturstaben).

In the Swedish Navy, in 1789, a Quartermaster General was appointed, in whose hand the entire economic board rested. The office was abolished in 1794.

== Quartermasters General ==
Portrait	Quartermaster General	Took office	Left office	Time in office	Defence branch	Monarch	Ref.
Johan Peter af Billbergh	Johan Peter af Billbergh (1776–1850); Acting	14 July 1812	?	0 years	–	Charles XIII	
Gösta Sandels	Lieutenant colonel (Note: Took office as captain in 1853, was promoted to major in 1854 and to lieutenant colonel in 1856.); Gösta Sandels (1815–1914); Acting	1853	1858	4–5 years	Army	Oscar I Charles XV	
Gösta Sandels	Lieutenant general (Note: Took office as lieutenant colonel in 1858, was promoted to colonel in 1862, to major general in 1864 and to lieutenant general on the reserve list in 1882.); Gösta Sandels (1815–1914)	1858	1883	24–25 years	Army	Oscar I Charles XV; Oscar II	
Hjalmar Palmstierna	Major general (Note: Took office as colonel on 26 February 1883 and was promoted to major general on 14 January 1887.); Hjalmar Palmstierna (1836–1909)	26 February 1883	1892	8–9 years	Army	Oscar II	
Christer Oxehufvud	Colonel; Christer Oxehufvud (1831–1917); Acting	15 March 1889	1890	0–1 years	Army	Oscar II	
Adam Thorén	Major general Adam Thorén (1835–1907)	1892	1896	3–4 years	Army	Oscar II	-
Richard Berg	Major general Richard Berg (1843–1924)	13 November 1896	1904	7–8 years	Army	Oscar II	
Knut Gillis Bildt	Major general Knut Gillis Bildt (1854–1927)	29 January 1904	1905	0–1 years	Army	Oscar II	
Fredrik Holmquist	Fredrik Holmquist (1847–1927)	3 November 1905	10 April 1915	9 years, 158 days	Army	Oscar II; Gustaf V	
Fredrik Frölich	Major general Fredrik Frölich (1861–1933)	10 April 1915	1926	10–11 years	Army	Gustaf V	
Axel Hultkrantz	Lieutenant general (Note: Took office as major general on 1 November 1926 and was promoted to lieutenant general on 28 April 1933.); Axel Hultkrantz (1870–1955)	1 November 1926	11 April 1935	8 years, 161 days	Army	Gustaf V	
Helge Söderbom	Major general Helge Söderbom (1881–1975)	1935	1946	10–11 years	Army	Gustaf V	
Ivar Gewert	Major general Ivar Gewert (1891–1971)	1946	1957	10–11 years	Army	Gustaf V Gustaf VI Adolf	
Hilding Kring	Major general Hilding Kring (1899–1971)	1 April 1957	30 June 1963	6 years, 90 days	Army	Gustaf VI Adolf	
