= Fänrik =

Swedish officer rank

Fänrik (Swedish: [ˈfɛ̌nːrɪk]) (English: second lieutenant in the Swedish Army/Air Force, Acting sub-lieutenant in the Navy) is a company grade officer rank. In the army/airforce, it ranks above sergeant and below lieutenant. In the navy, it ranks above sergeant and below sub-lieutenant. It is equivalent to the specialist officers rank of översergeant. Fänrik means standard-bearer and has been used as a name for the lowest officer rank in the Swedish infantry since the 16th century, with the exception of the years 1835–1914.

== Army/Air Force/Navy ==
Second lieutenant Fänrik
- Country: Sweden
- Service branch: Army; Air Force; Navy (Amphibious Corps (Note: Swedish Coastal Artillery (1902–2000), Swedish Amphibious Corps (2000–present).))
- Abbreviation: Fk (Swedish), 2Lt (English)
- Rank: Second lieutenant
- NATO rank code: OF-1
- Formation: 16th century
- Next higher rank: Lieutenant (1937–present); Underlöjtnant (1926–1937)
- Next lower rank: Sergeant
- Equivalent ranks: Acting sub-lieutenant (navy); Översergeant; Underlöjtnant (1914–1926)

Fänrik (second lieutenant) is a rank in the Swedish Army, Swedish Air Force and in the Swedish Navy (Coastal Artillery 1902–2000, Amphibious Corps 2000–present).

=== History ===
Fänrik was already during the latter part of the Middle Ages the name of the officer at the fana or fänika, who carried the colour. Later the fänrik was relieved of this duty, and he became the closest man of the höfvitsman (commander) or captain. During the 17th century, the lieutenant, who had previously been the assistant of the fänrik, rose above him, and the name then came to denote the lowest officer rank in the infantry. In Sweden it was exchanged in 1835 for underlöjtnant. With the 1914 Army Order, Naval Plan and Plan for the Fixed Coastal Defence Organization (1914 års härordning, flottplan och plan för fasta kustförsvarets ordnande), the rank of fänrik was reintroduced as a name for a newly commissioned officer, who completed two years of probationary service. The fänrik would have underlöjtnant's position and salary benefits but be appointed by Warrant of Appointment.

In Bill 1924:20, the 1st Special Committee of the Riksdag (Riksdagens 1. särskilda utskott) stated that, in the committee's opinion, a satisfactory order would be obtained if the existing rank of fänrik and underlöjtnant were divided into two ranks. After receiving written authorization, sergeants would be assigned the rank of fänrik with the title retained. The question was re-examined by the 1924 Non-Commissioned Officer Expert Investigation (1924 års underofficerssakkunniga), whose proposal (SOU 1925:7) essentially corresponded with the above-mentioned committee opinion, however, that sergeants should not be given a higher rank. The staff representatives among the experts, however, insisted that sergeants by written authorization should receive the rank of fänrik. General Order No. 1806/1925 regulated for the army (Note: For the Swedish Navy, letters patent applied on 18 December 1925.) the position of non-commissioned officers in accordance with guidelines issued by the Minister of Defence (Bill 1925:50). These meant that the rank of fänrik and underlöjtnant was divided into two ranks. The 1930 Defense Commission (1930 års försvarskommission) proposed (SOU 1935:38) that the rank of fänrik and underlöjtnant should be merged into one rank, fänrik. The rank of underlöjtnant was formally abolished in 1937.

According to the 1972 reform, holders of the rank of fänrik were given the rank lieutenant in the regimental officers corps. Holders of the following ranks of fanjunkare (with less than 3 years of service) and sergeant (with less than 3 years of service) were given the rank fänrik, in the separate company officers corps. In the 1983 reform, the meaning of the term officer broadened to include all professional and reserve military personnel. Fänrik was subsequently set to be the lowest rank for professional and reserve military personnel. To be employed as an officer in the Swedish Armed Forces, the candidate was required to complete two years of Officers College (OHS). The objective of the 2009 reform was to produce officers who are specialized at commanding troops at platoon, company and higher level as well as providing officers of academic status.

=== Promotion ===
According to Chapter 2, Section 1 of FFS 2018:7, a person who is eligible for promotion has served in the Swedish Armed Forces to such an extent that assessment of suitability, knowledge and skills could be carried out, is deemed suitable for promotion, possesses the knowledge and skills required for the higher rank, and meets time requirements according to Section 2 (must have held the rank for at least two years). After having passed the Career Officer Programme, the cadet will be promoted to second lieutenant and be posted to a job. For promotion from second lieutenant to lieutenant may take place if the second lieutenant holds an academic degree at the undergraduate level. A second lieutenant who has completed the Swedish Armed Forces' pilot training with an approved result may be promoted to lieutenant without holding an academic degree at the undergraduate level. In the case of reserve officers, promotion of second lieutenant to lieutenant may take place if the second lieutenant holds an academic degree at the undergraduate level, or at least 180 higher education credits (högskolepoäng) if the program comprises more higher education credits than 180.

=== Uniform ===
==== Collar patches ====
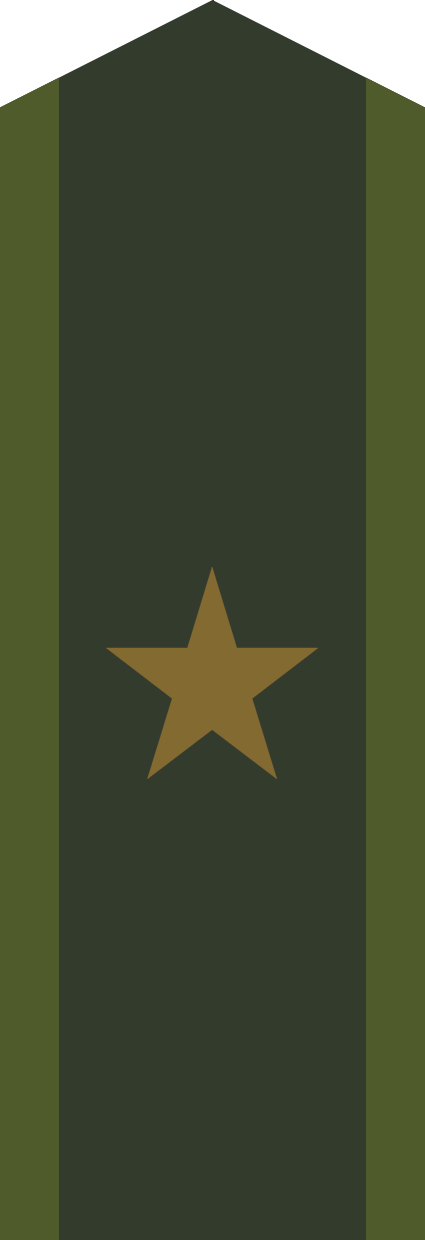
Collar patch m/58 for a second lieutenant

==== Shoulder insignia ====
===== Air Force =====
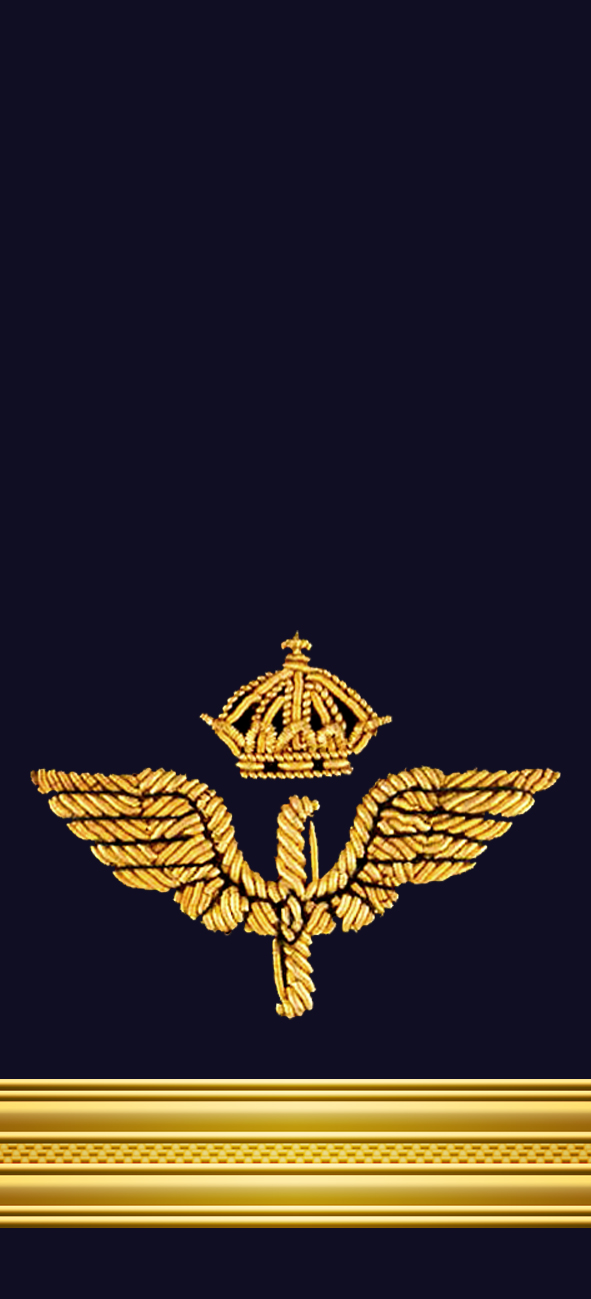
(?–present)

===== Army =====
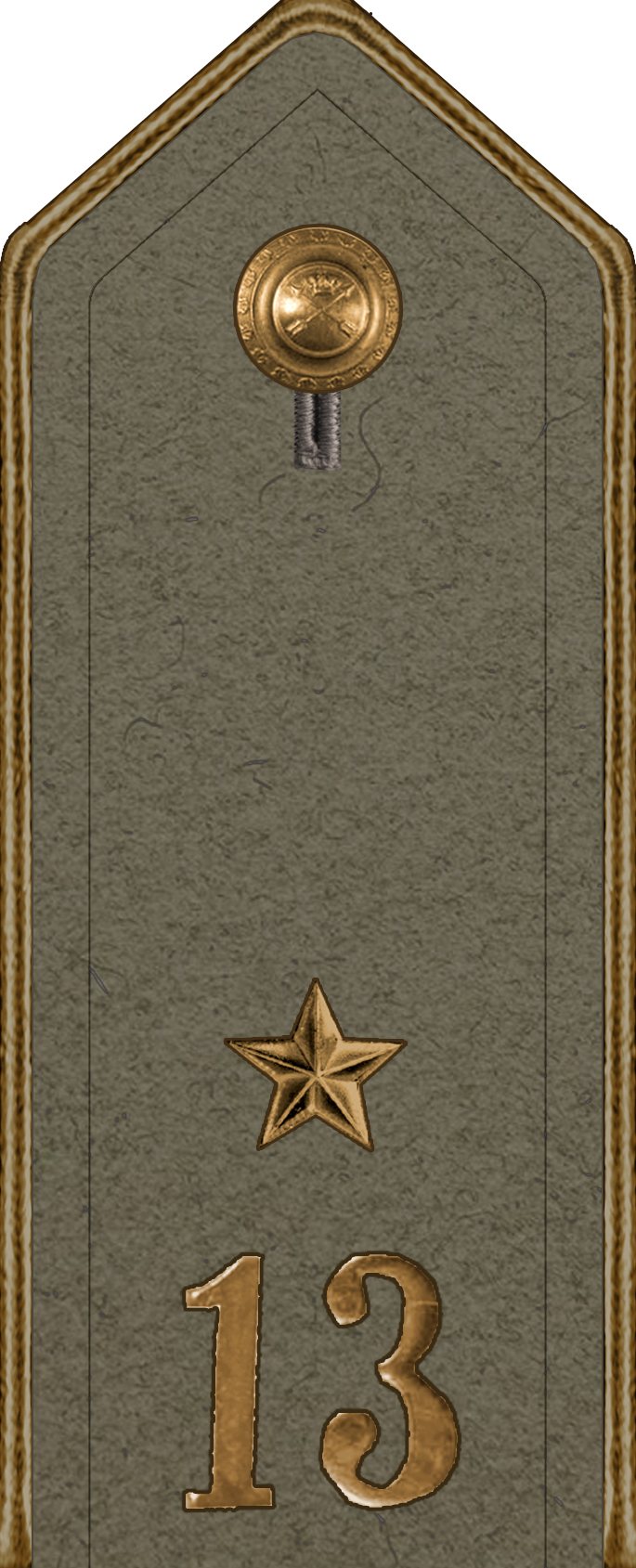
Shoulder strap m/39
(13 = Dalarna Regiment)

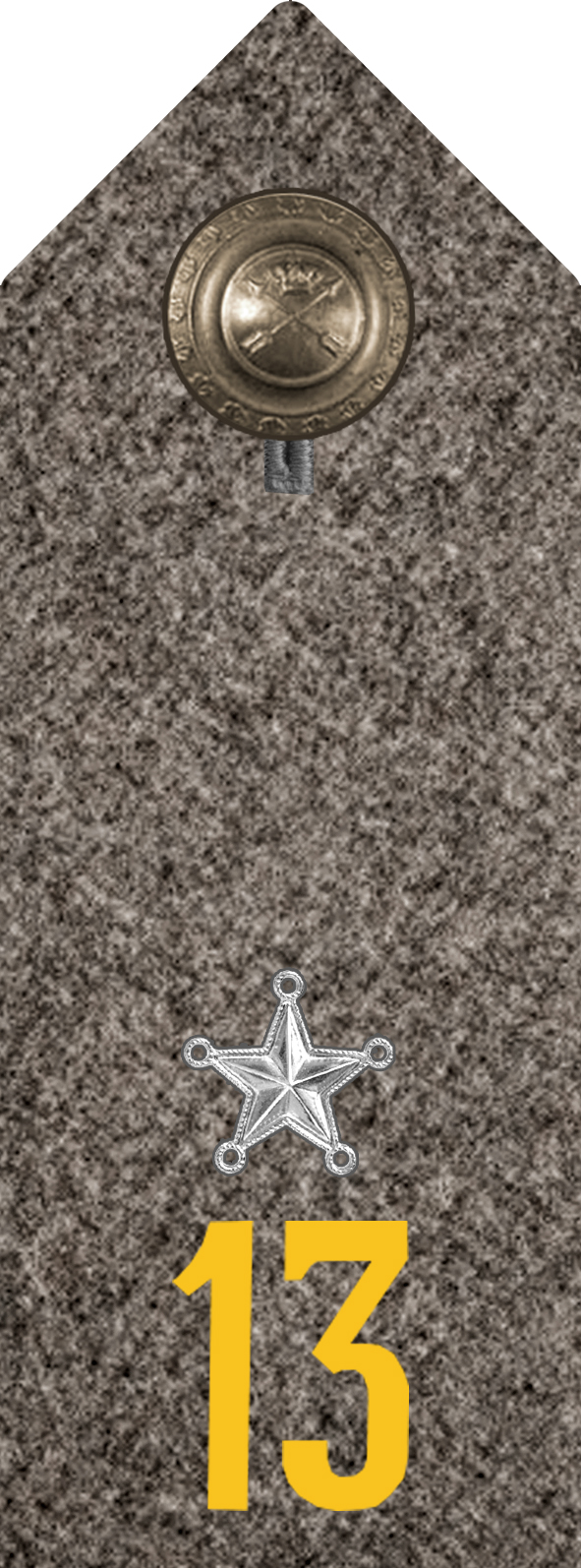
Shoulder strap m/1923
(13 = Dalarna Regiment)

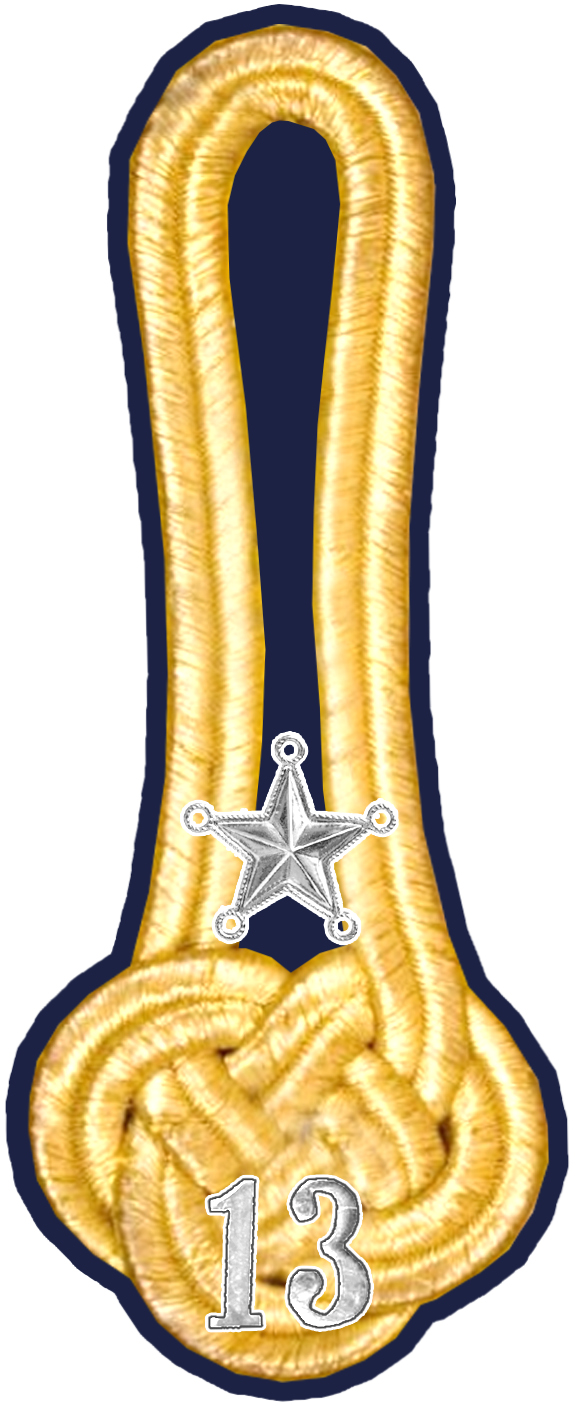
Shoulder knot m/1910
(13 = Dalarna Regiment)

===== Navy (Amphibious Corps) =====
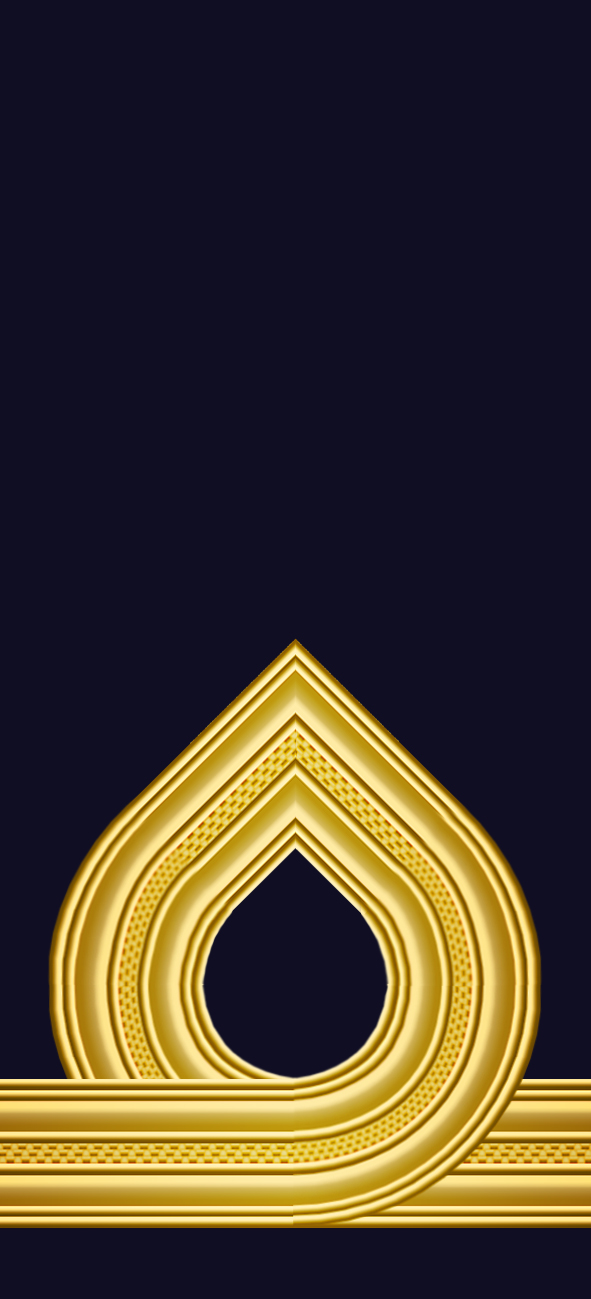
Embroidered shoulder insignia (Navy)
(?–present)

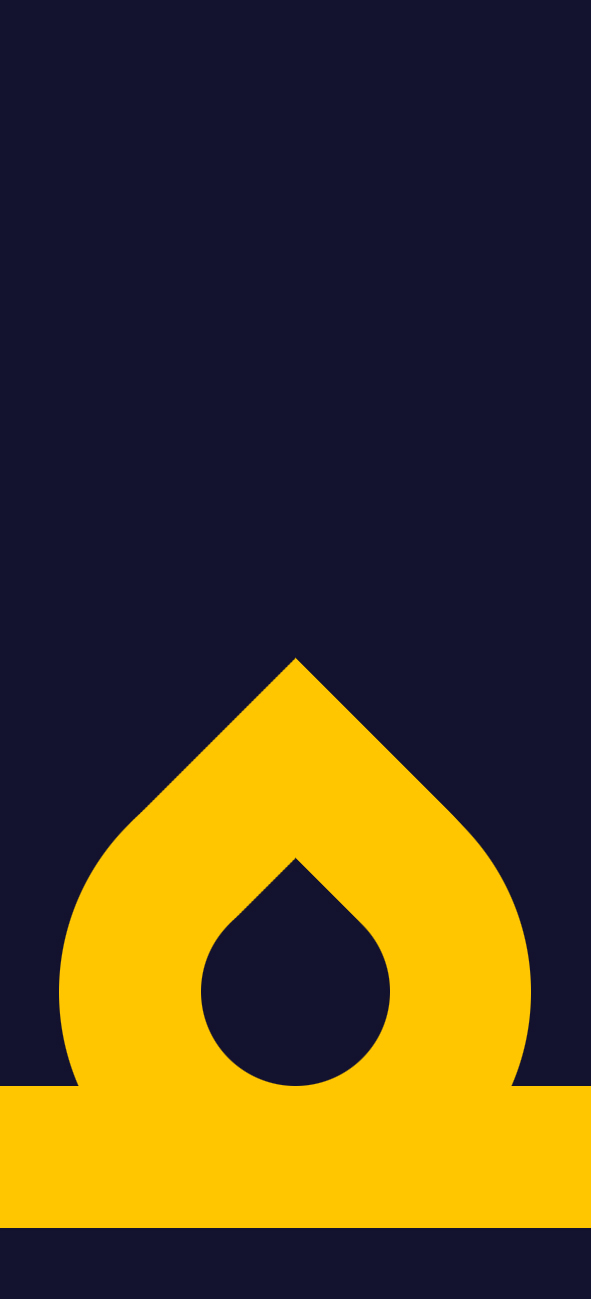
Woven shoulder insignia (?–present)

==== Air Force ====
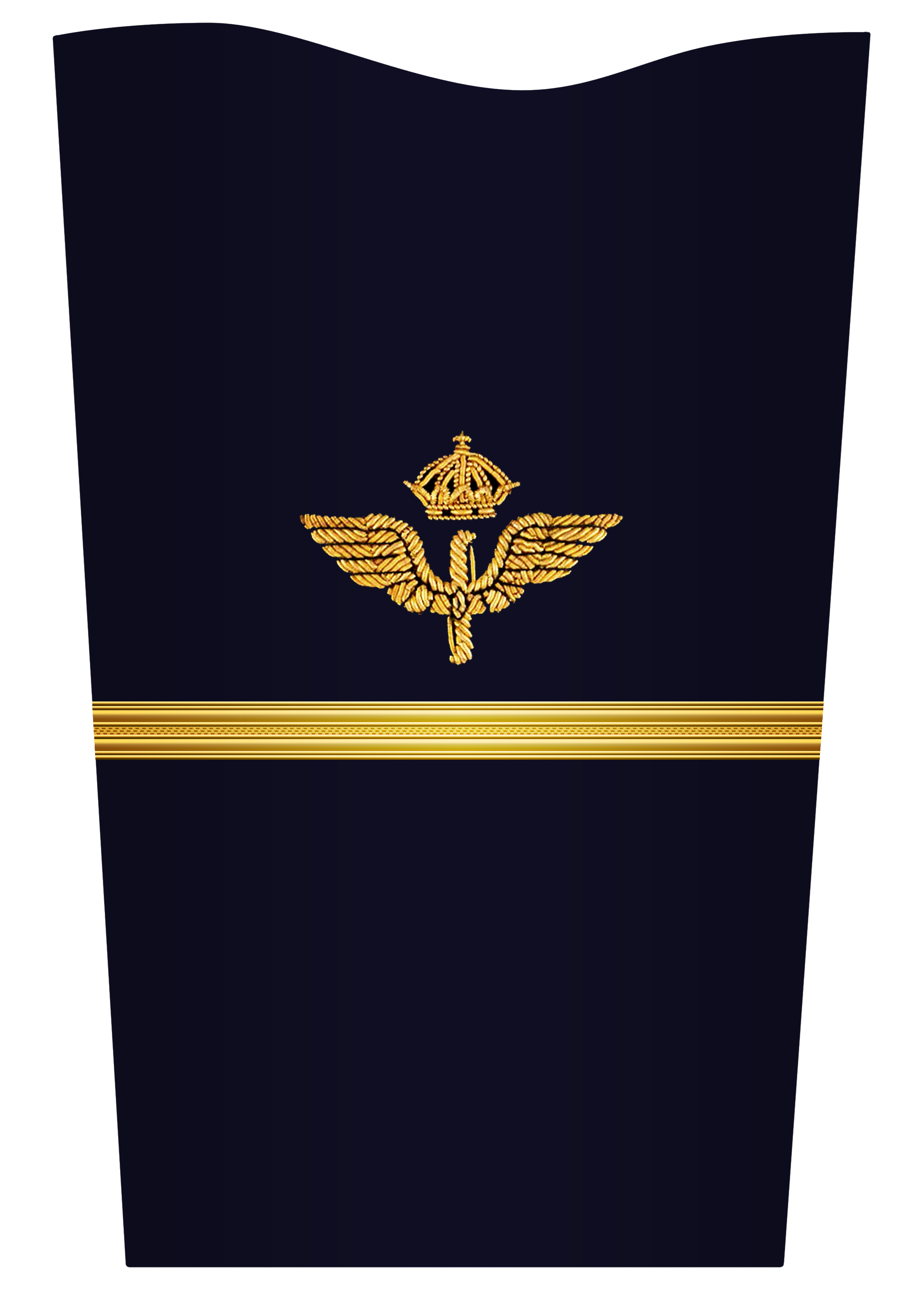
Mess jacket sleeve insignia for a second lieutenant
(?–present)

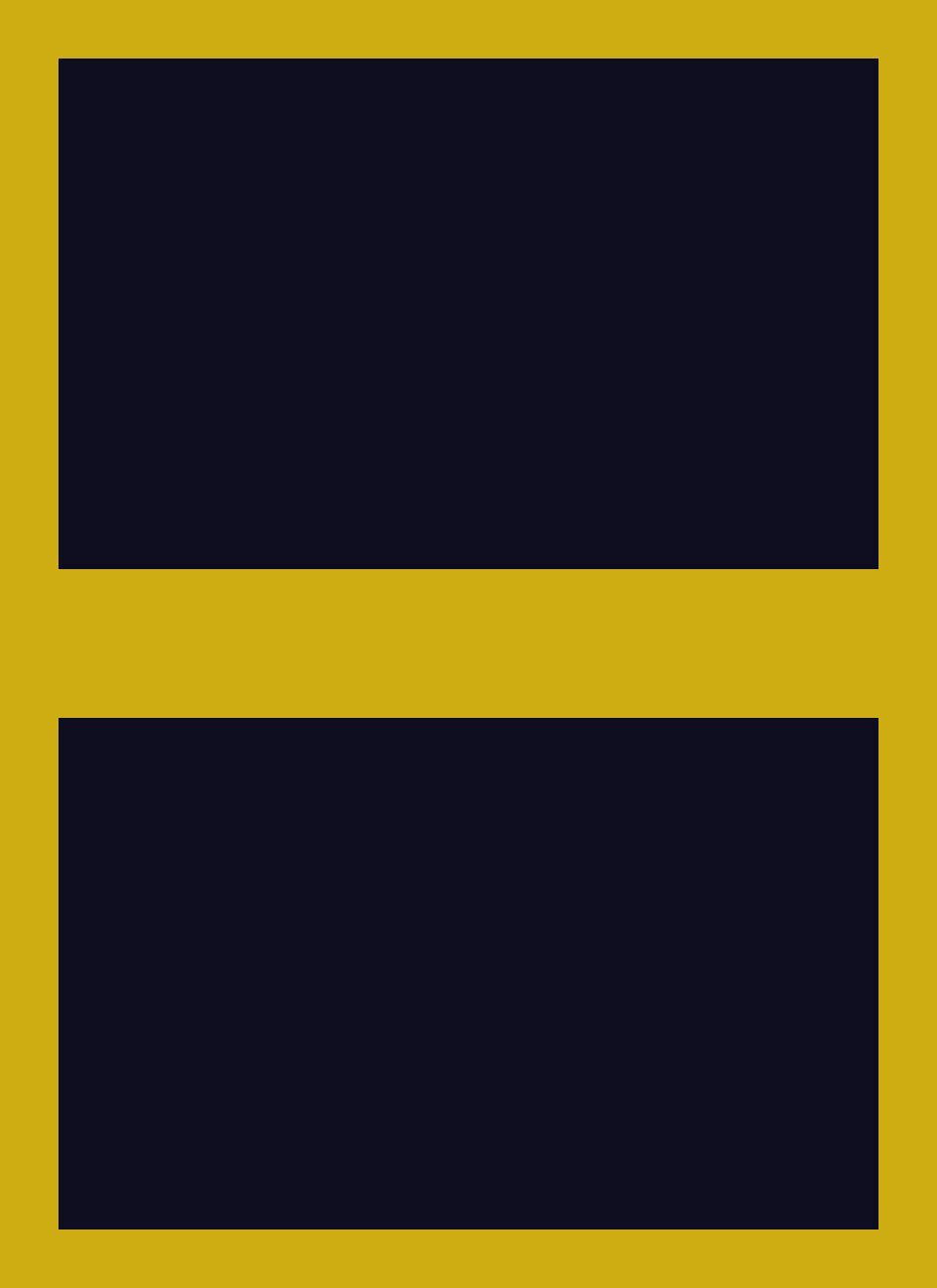
Flight suit sleeve insignia for a second lieutenant
(2003–present)

===== Navy (Amphibious Corps) =====
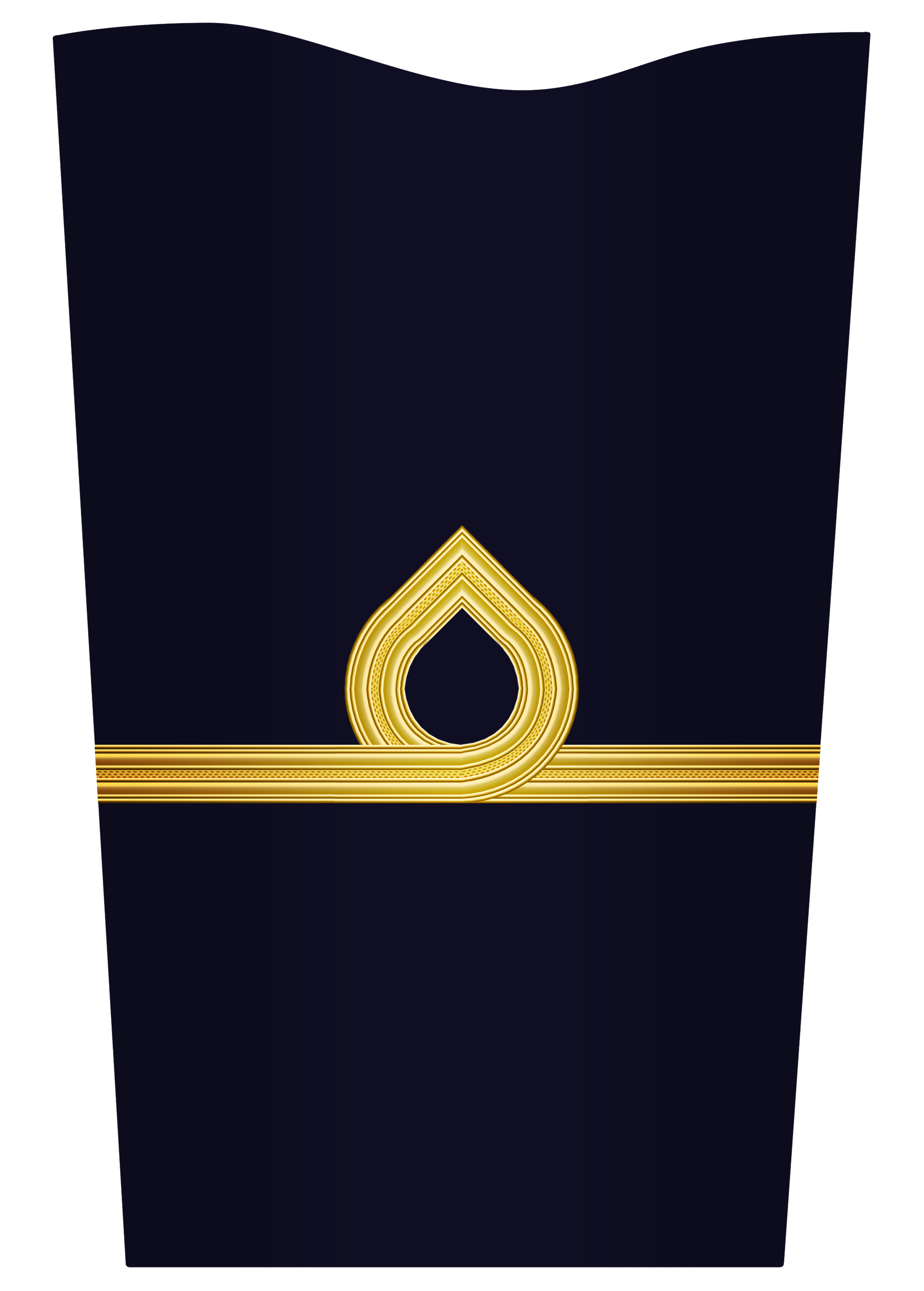
Sleeve insignia on innerkavaj m/48 ("inner jacket m/48") for a second lieutenant.
(?–present)

=== Hats ===
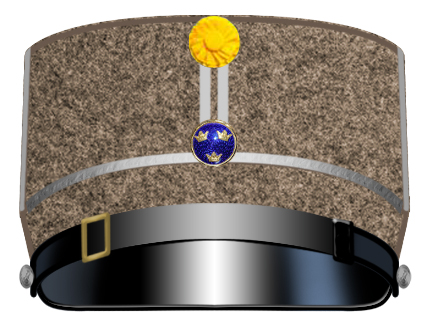
Hat (Mössa m/1923) for a second lieutenant

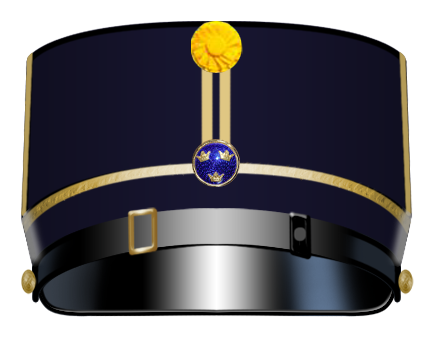
Camp hat (Lägermössa m/1865-99) for a second lieutenant

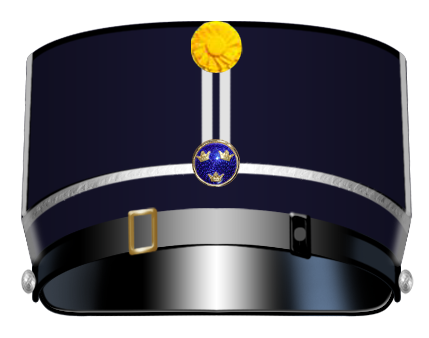
Hat (Mössa m/1865-99) for a second lieutenant in the Life Guards infantry

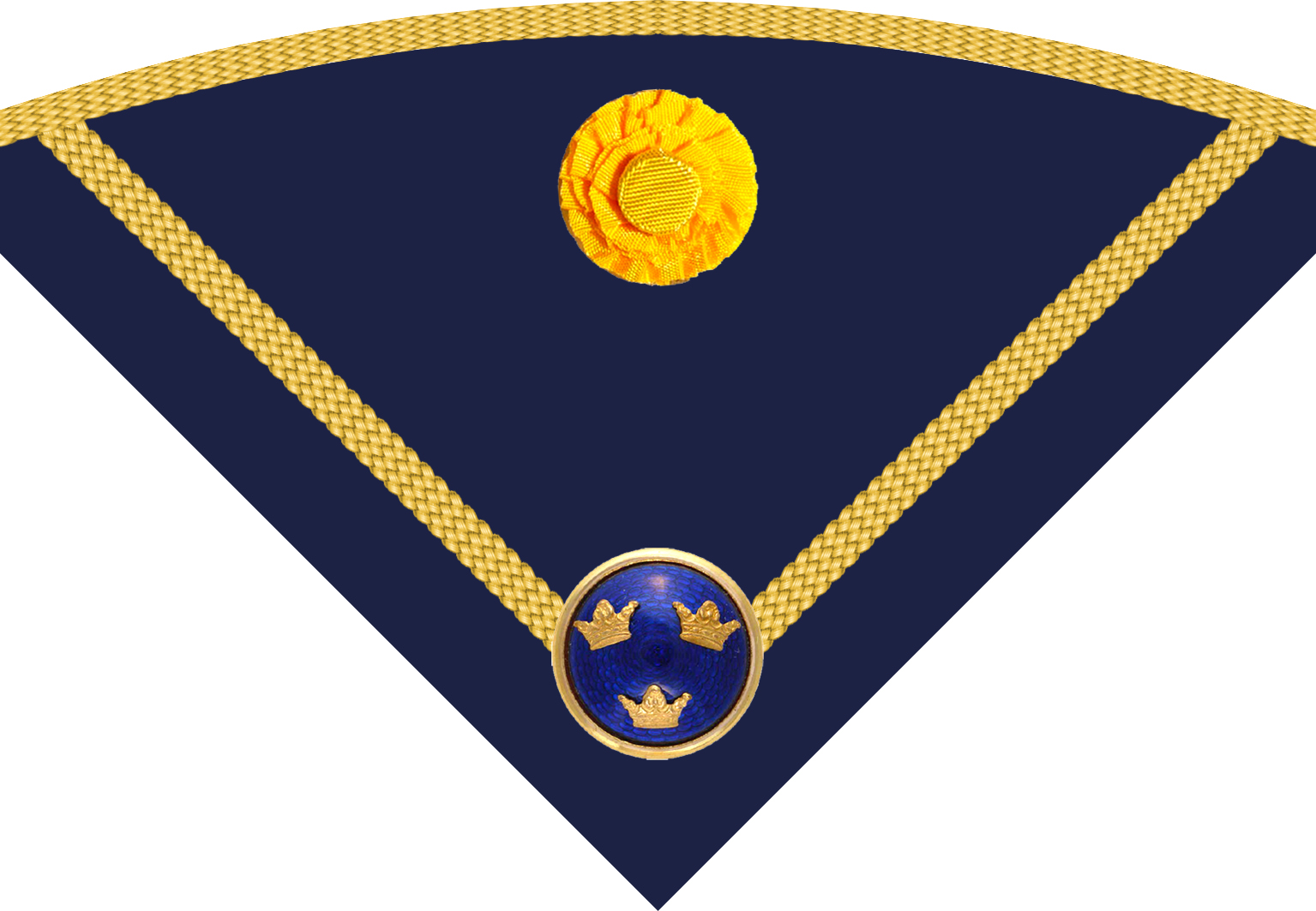
Rank insignia for a second lieutenant on hat (Hatt m/1910-14) in the army
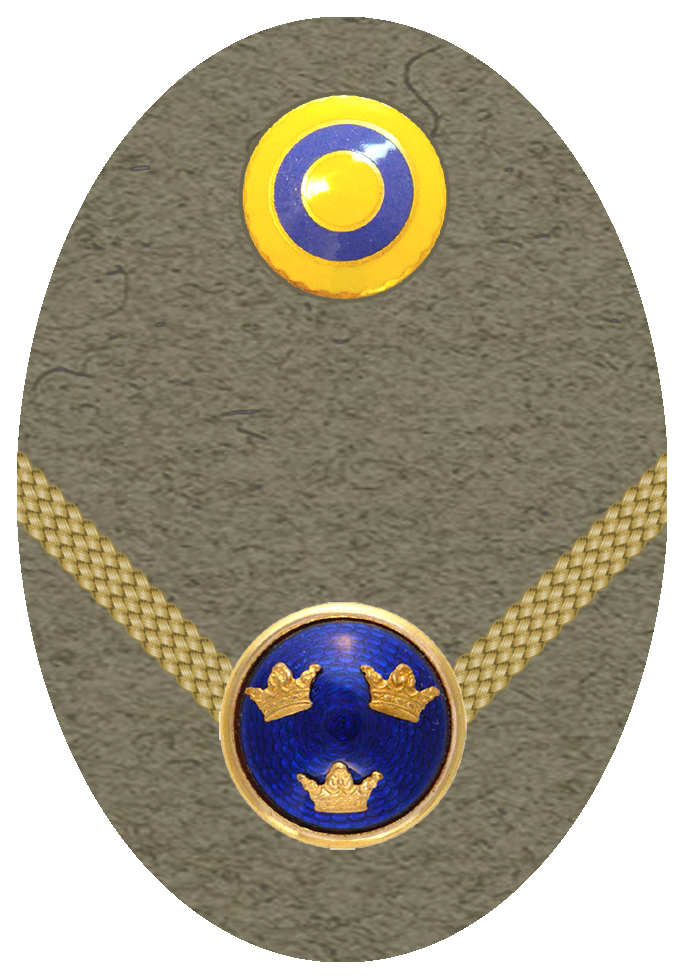
Hat badge (Mössmärke m/1946) for a second lieutenant in the army

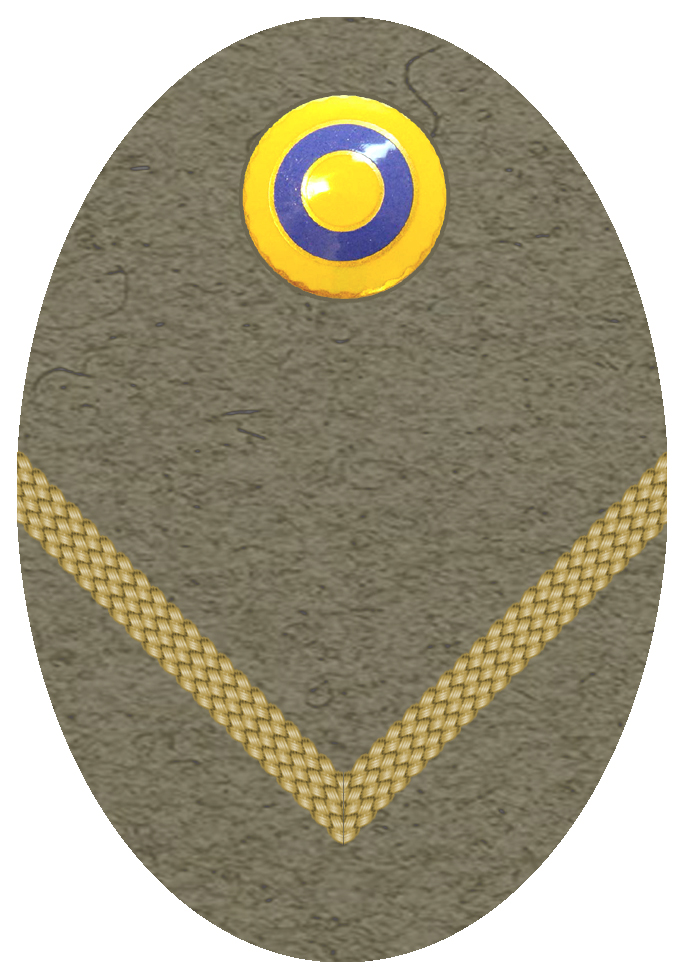
Hat badge (Mössmärke m/1940) for a second lieutenant in the army

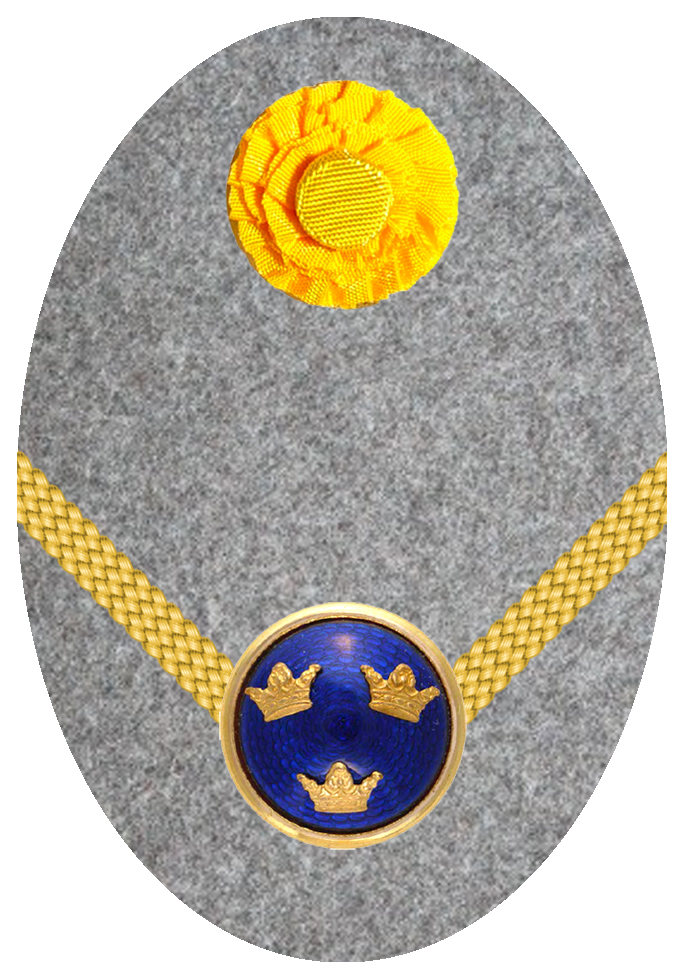
Hat badge (Mössmärke m/1914) for a second lieutenant in the army on fur hat (pälsmössa m/1909-14)

== Navy ==
Acting sub-lieutenant Fänrik
- Country: Sweden
- Service branch: Navy
- Abbreviation: Fk (Swedish), ASLt (English)
- Rank: Acting sub-lieutenant
- NATO rank code: OF-1
- Next higher rank: Sub-lieutenant
- Next lower rank: Sergeant
- Equivalent ranks: Second lieutenant (army/air force); Översergeant

Fänrik (acting sub-lieutenant) is a rank in the Swedish Navy.

=== Duties ===
During the acting sub-lieutenant's first two years, his specialization – profiling will begin/continue towards the intended focus/trade/function. This specialization is determined by the unit according to the unit's specific needs for competence. The content of this period shall form a basis for developing the abilities described in order to be promoted to sub-lieutenant. The acting sub-lieutenant should be supervised during this period. Positions during this period are e.g. platoon commander, operator positions on board a ship.

=== Promotion ===
According to Chapter 2, Section 1 of FFS 2018:7, a person who is eligible for promotion has served in the Swedish Armed Forces to such an extent that assessment of suitability, knowledge and skills could be carried out, is deemed suitable for promotion, possesses the knowledge and skills required for the higher rank, and meets time requirements according to Section 2 (must have held the rank for at least two years). After having passed the Career Officer Programme, the cadet will be promoted to acting sub-lieutenant and be posted to a job. For promotion from acting sub-lieutenant to sub-lieutenant may take place if the acting sub-lieutenant holds an academic degree at the undergraduate level. An acting sub-lieutenant who has completed the Swedish Armed Forces' pilot training with an approved result may be promoted to sub-lieutenant without holding an academic degree at the undergraduate level. In the case of reserve officers, promotion of acting sub-lieutenant to sub-lieutenant may take place if the acting sub-lieutenant holds an academic degree at the undergraduate level, or at least 180 higher education credits (högskolepoäng) if the program comprises more higher education credits than 180.

=== Uniform ===
==== Shoulder insignia ====
The top galloon is shaped like a "loop" for an officer in the Swedish Navy (the loop is shaped like a "grenade" for an officer in the Swedish Amphibious Corps). The rank insignia is worn on the shoulders of the jacket and coat (jacka m/87, kappa m/87), as well as the blue wool sweater (blå ylletröja m/87), trench coat (trenchcoat m/84), sea coat (sjörock 93, black raincoat and to white shirt (vit skjorta m/78). Rank insignia (axelklaffshylsa 02B) is worn on all garments with shoulder straps.

1. The shoulder insignia (Axelklaffshylsa m/02B) is designed as galloons sewn directly to another shoulder insignia (axelklaffshylsa m/87 blå).

2. The woven shoulder insignia (AXELKLAFFSHYLSA M/02 INVÄVD KAPTEN FLOTTAN) is worn on the naval combat dress (sjöstridsdräkt m/93), duty uniform (arbetsdräkt m/87 (blå)) and combat uniform (Fältuniform m/90 lätt, m/90 lätt blå, m/90 tropik (green, beige and blue)).

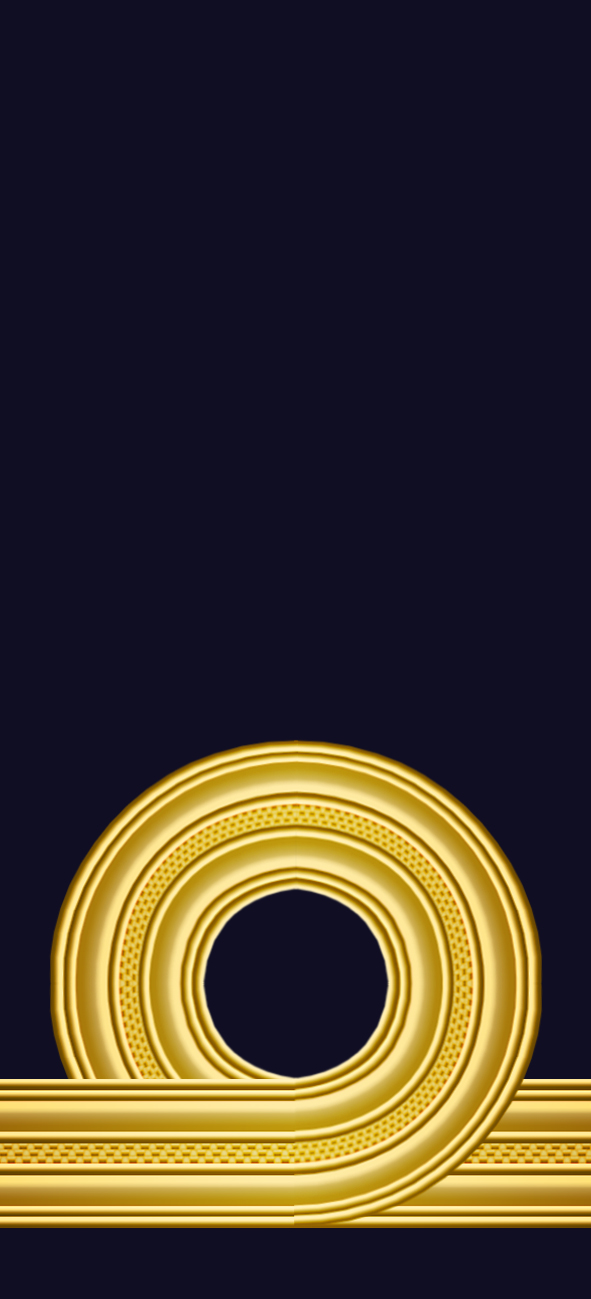
1. Embroidered shoulder insignia (2003–present)

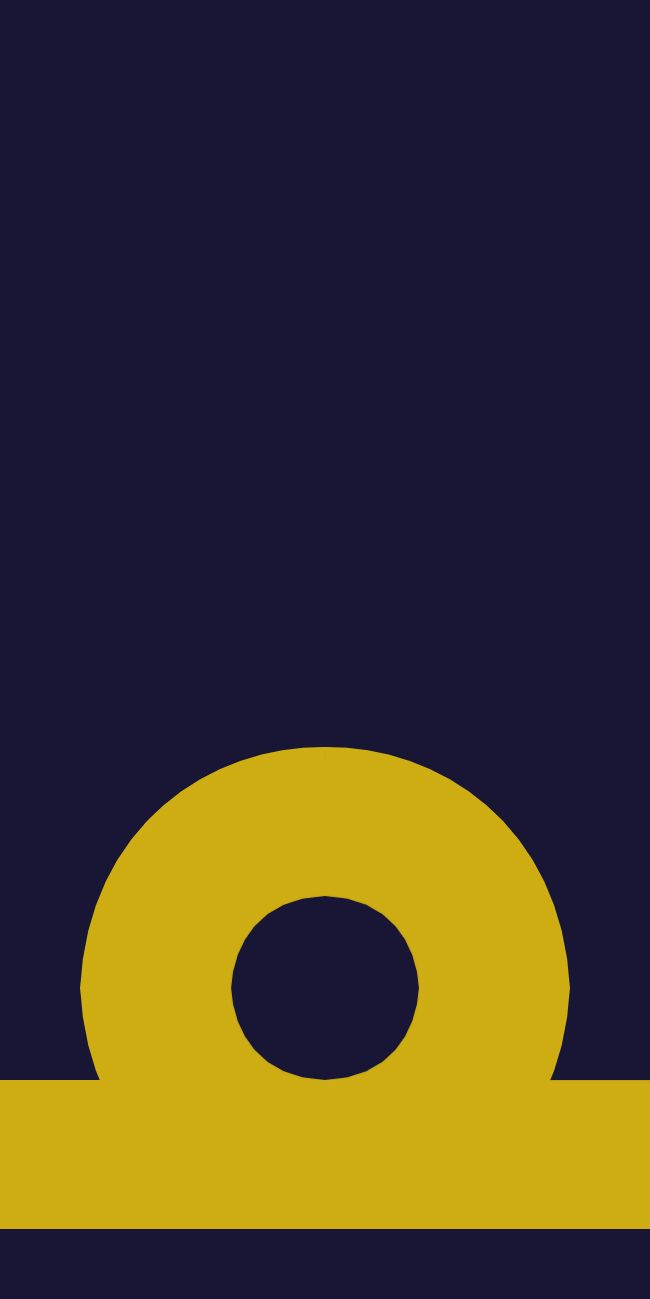
2. Woven shoulder insignia (2003–present)

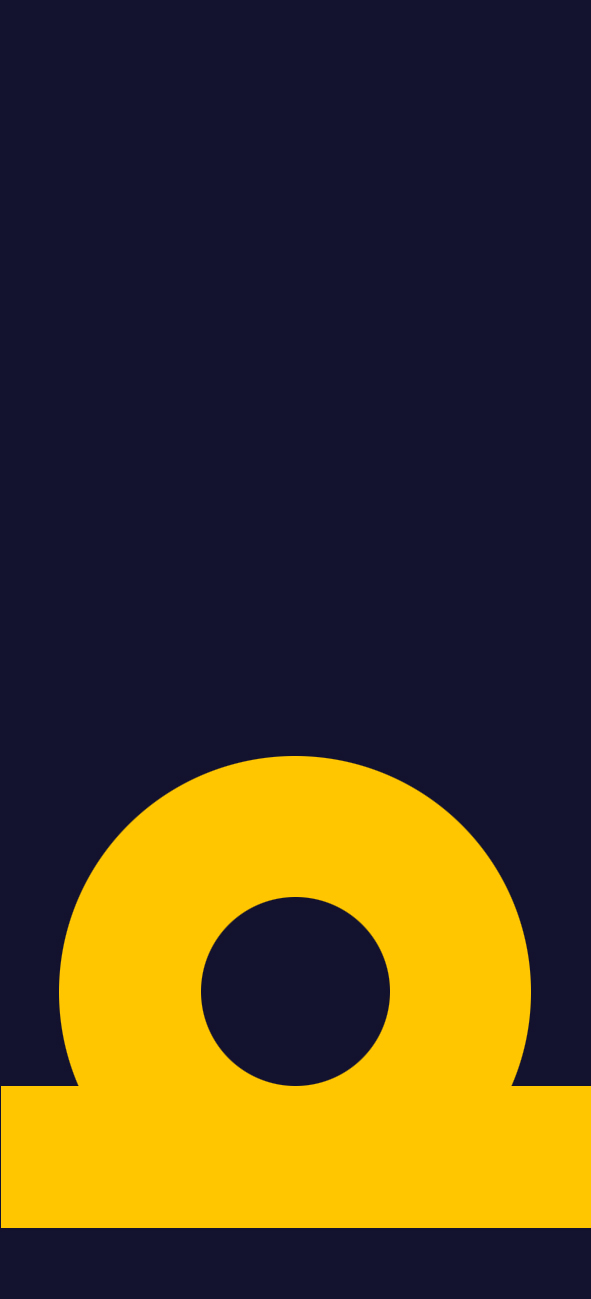
2. Woven shoulder insignia (2003–present)

==== Sleeve insignias ====
Rank insignia is worn on both sleeves for inner suit jacket (innerkavaj m/48) and mess jacket (mässjacka m/1878).

1. On the sleeve an 12,6 mm rank insignia (gradbeteckning m/02) and galloon (galon m/02). The distance between galloons should be 6 mm. The distance from the bottom edge of the sleeve to the bottom edge of the top galloon should be 100 mm.

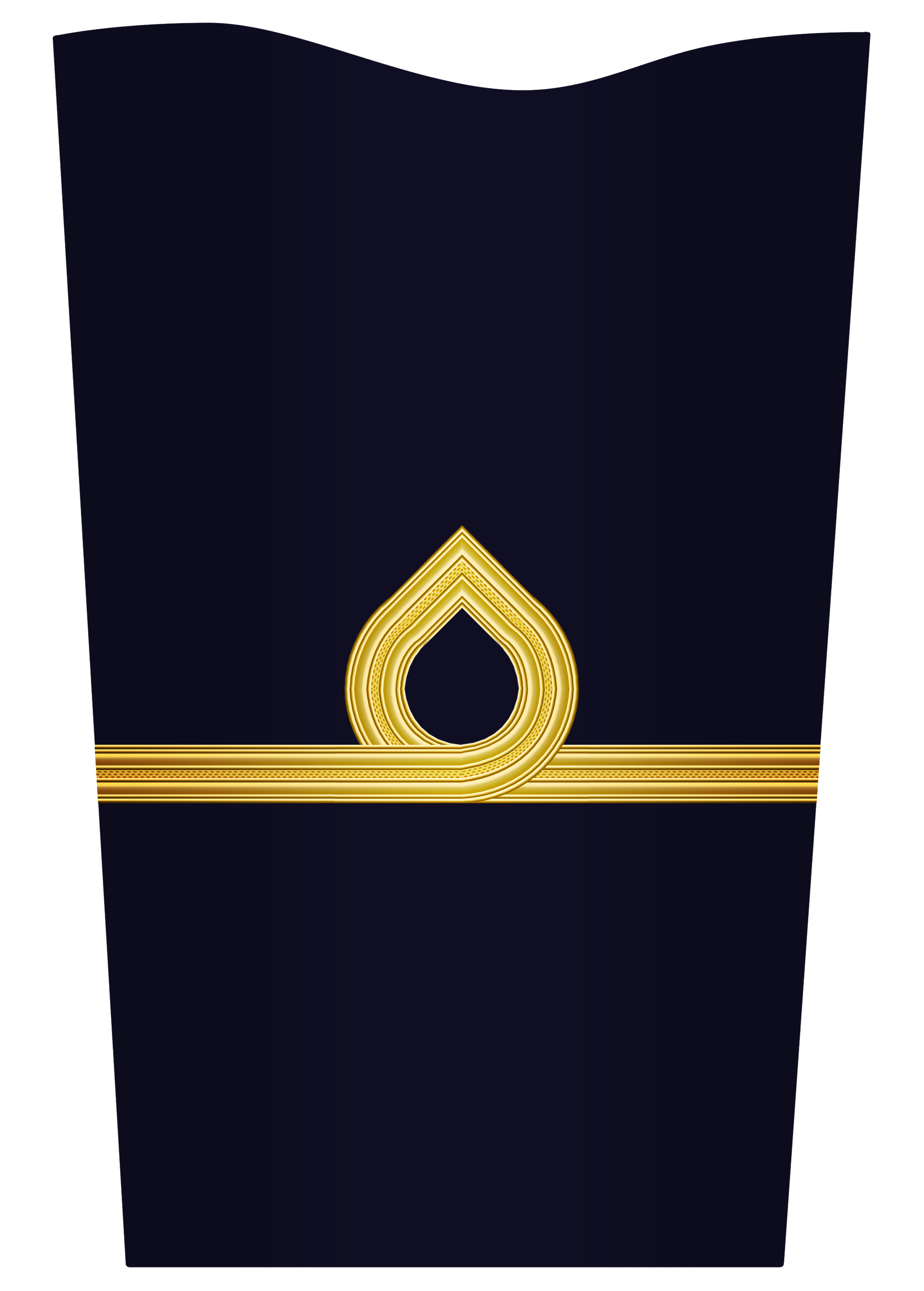
1. Sleeve insignia for an acting sub-lieutenant (2003–present)

==== Hats ====
===== Peaked cap =====
An acting sub-lieutenant wears a peaked cap (skärmmössa m/48) which is fitted with a hat badge (mössmärke m/78 off för flottan) and with a lacing in form of a golden thread (mössnodd m/82).

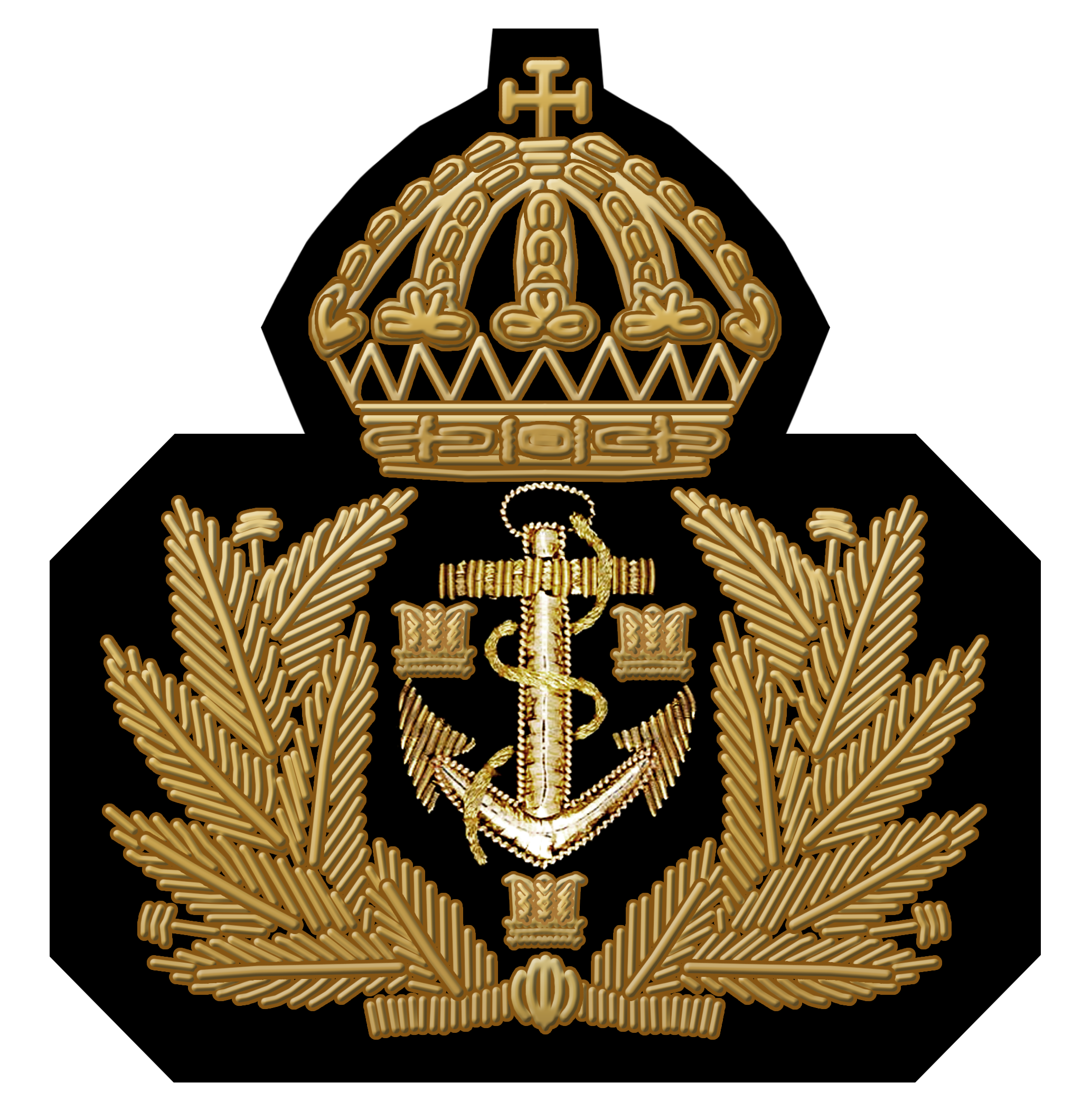
Hat badge

===== Side cap and winter hat =====
An officer wears a hat badge (mössmärke m/78 off) for the navy and another (mössmärke m/87 off) for amphibious units on the side cap (båtmössa m/48) and on the winter hat (vintermössa m/87).

==== Epaulette ====
An acting sub-lieutenant wears epaulette's (epålett m/1878) to white tie (frack m/1878) and to coat (rock m/1878). On the epaulette, an acting sub-lieutenant wears 2 mm fringes in two rows.
