= Swedish Army Quartermaster Corps =

Administrative corps of the Swedish Army

- Intendenturkåren
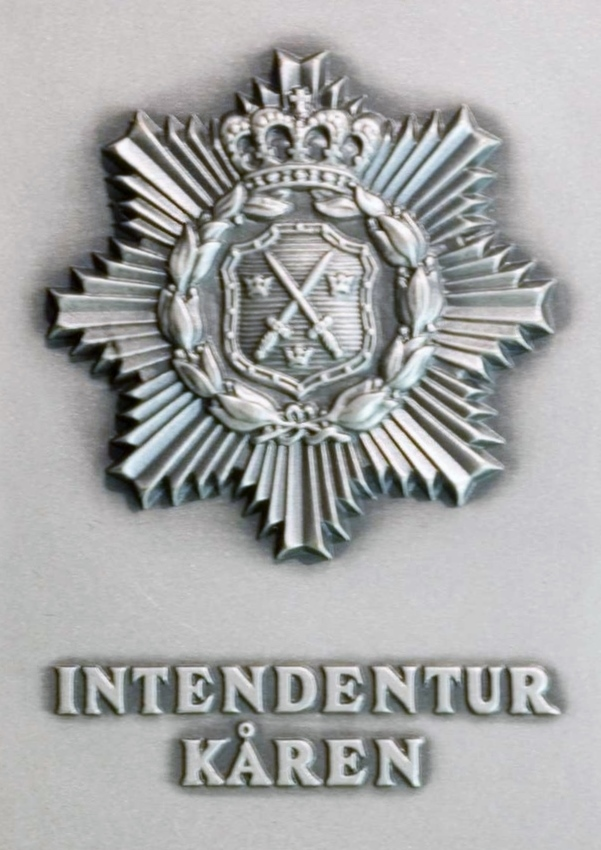
- Commemorative plaquette of the Swedish Army Quartermaster Corps.
- Active: 1880–1966
- Country: Sweden
- Allegiance: Swedish Armed Forces
- Branch: Swedish Army
- Type: Administrative corps/Personnel branch
- Role: Quartermaster
- Size: 187 people (1936) c. 209 active (1960s)

Commanders
- Notable commanders: Knut Gillis Bildt; Helge Söderbom; Ivar Gewert; Hilding Kring

Insignia
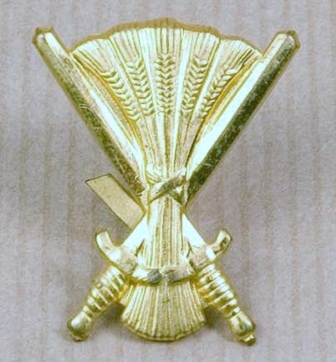
- Insignia

The Swedish Army Quartermaster Corps (Swedish: Intendenturkåren) was an administrative corps for personnel within the Swedish Army created in 1880. From the corps, the Swedish Army was provided with staff for various commissary positions. The head of the corps was the Quartermaster-General of the Swedish Army. In 1966, the corps was amalgamated with the Swedish Naval Quartermaster Corps and the Swedish Air Force's quartermaster officers and formed the Quartermaster Corps of the Swedish Armed Forces. It was in turn amalgamated with the Swedish Army Ordnance Corps in 1973 and formed the Commissary Corps of the Swedish Armed Forces which was disbanded in 1990.

== History ==
Swedish Army Quartermaster Corps (Arméns intendenturkår) was formed by Royal Decree on 9 April 1880. The creation of the corps was part of the ongoing reform of the Swedish Army's administrative organization. The idea was that through a unified management lay the foundations of good recruitment and better training of administrative personnel. Head of the corps was the Quartermaster-General of the Swedish Army, who also headed the Royal Swedish Army Materiel Administration's Quartermaster Department which from 1943 was called the Army Administration's Commissariat Department (Arméförvaltningens intendenturavdelning) and from 1954 was called the Royal Swedish Army Supply Administration. In his capacity as chief of the corps, the Quartermaster-General had, at his side, an office or staff, which over time was reorganized and changed its name on several occasions:

- 1880–1893 – Generalintendentens expedition ("Office of the Quartermaster-General")
- 1893–1907 – Intendenturkårens huvudstation ("Main station of the Quartermaster Corps"), which included the Generalintendentens expedition ("Office of the Quartermaster-General") as well as the Intendenturkårens chefsexpedition ("Head Office of the Quartermaster Corps")
- 1907–1914 – Generalintendentens expedition ("Office of the Quartermaster-General")
- 1914–1937 – Intendenturstaben ("Quartermaster Staff"), which included the Intendenturkårens chefsexpedition ("Head Office of the Quartermaster Corps")
- 1937–1966 – Intendenturkåren ("Quartermaster Corps"), Chefsexpeditionen ("Head Office")

At the time of the formation, the corps comprised all the personnel who handled administrative duties that belonged to the supplies in army units and stores. During the 1890s, the quartermaster staff at the General Staff and the Royal Swedish Army Materiel Administration's Quartermasters Department (Arméförvaltningens intendentsdepartement) were also included. Initially, the corps was regarded as civil-military, but was awarded military corps status in 1915. In order to gain entry as a member of the corps, one later required completed training in commissariat service. Quartermaster aspirants were trained from 1909 at the corps' military management course; from 1943 at the Swedish Army Quartermaster School (Intendenturförvaltningsskolan).

From the corps, the army was provided with staff for the various commissary positions (regimental quartermasters and commissioners, förvaltare and others). The 1907 administrative reform distinguished certain parts of the administration from the area of responsibility of the corps (arms, buildings, healthcare, etc.). Remaining was the responsibility for camp, rations, clothing, horses, certain vehicles, fuels and accounting matters. The Defence Act of 1936 meant in this regard that the motor vehicles were completely removed from the corps.

After World War II, the organization of the military administration and its staff corps' were investigated. The result was partly a coordination of the Swedish Army Supply Administration (Arméintendenturörvaltningen) with the Royal Swedish Naval Materiel Administration's Commissariat Department (Marinförvaltningen intendenturavdelning) and the Royal Swedish Air Force Materiel Administration Commissariat Bureau (Flygförvaltningens intendenturbyrå) to the newly established Quartermaster Administration of the Swedish Armed Forces in 1963; and to a corresponding coordination of the Swedish Army Quartermaster Corps (Intendenturkåren) with the Swedish Naval Quartermaster Corps (formed in 1904) and the Swedish Air Force's quartermaster officers (which had not previously constituted a special staff corps) to a joint corps, the Quartermaster Corps of the Swedish Armed Forces which was established in 1966.

== Quartermasters-General ==
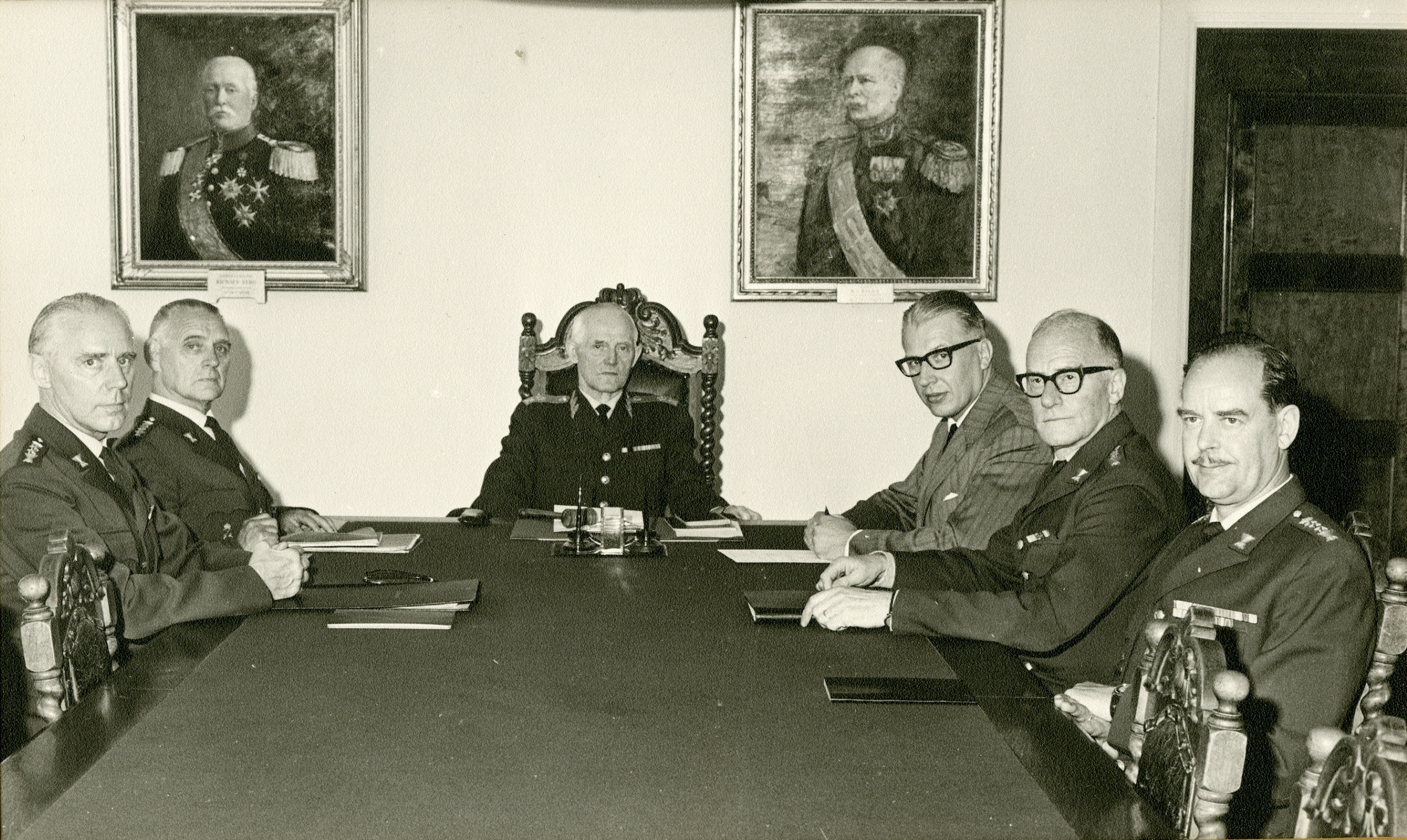
Quartermaster-General Major General Hilding Kring at the last plenary session of the Royal Swedish Army Supply Administration in June 1963.

The Quartermaster-General of the Swedish Army was commanding officer of the Swedish Army Quartermaster Corps and head of the Royal Swedish Army Materiel Administration's Quartermaster Department. He was also Inspector of the Quartermaster Service Troops (Intendenturtrupperna, Int) and regarding the training of these troops, he had similar duties as other branch inspectors. In his capacity as head of the Swedish Army Quartermaster Corps and Inspector of the Quartermaster Service Troops, he was assisted most closely by personnel of the Quartermaster Staff (Intendenturstaben).

- 1880–1883: ?
- 1883–1892: Hjalmar Palmstierna
- 1889–1890: Christer Oxehufvud (acting)
- 1892–1896: Adam Thorén
- 1896–1904: Richard Berg
- 1904–1905: Knut Gillis Bildt
- 1905–1915: Fredrik Holmquist
- 1915–1926: Fredrik Frölich
- 1926–1935: Axel Hultkrantz
- 1935–1946: Helge Söderbom
- 1946–1957: Ivar Gewert
- 1957–1963: Hilding Kring
- 1963–1966: Folke Diurlin
