= Underlöjtnant =

Swedish military rank

- Country: Sweden
- Service branch: Army
- Rank: Ensign
- Formation: 1835
- Abolished: 1937
- Next higher rank: Löjtnant
- Next lower rank: Fänrik (1926–1937)
- Equivalent ranks: Fänrik (1914–1926)

Underlöjtnant (from the German word Unterleutnant) was the lowest officer rank in the Swedish Army from 1835 to 1937 instead of the previous ranks of fänrik and cornet. Fänrik was reintroduced in 1914 with the same position as underlöjtnant, from 1926 with lower position.

== History ==
Underlöjtnant was introduced as a military rank in Sweden in 1835 instead of fänrik. Fanjunkare, who served with distinction, was often promoted after leaving active service to underlöjtnant in the Swedish Army. With the 1914 Army Order, Naval Plan and Plan for the Fixed Coastal Defence Organization (1914 års härordning, flottplan och plan för fasta kustförsvarets ordnande), the rank of fänrik was reintroduced as a name for a newly commissioned officer, who completed two years of probationary service. The fänrik would have underlöjtnant's position and salary benefits but be appointed by Warrant of Appointment. The Minister of Defence proposed (Bill 1924:20) that certain förrådsförvaltare should receive a rank above the rank of fänrik-underlöjtnant with the position of löjtnant. They would be called sekundlöjtnanter ("second lieutenants"). Fanjunkare would receive the rank of fänrik while retaining the title. The term non-commissioned officer would be replaced by sekundofficer ("second officer"). With regard to the officer corps, the rank of underlöjtnant was to be abolished.

Above the bill, the 1st Special Committee of the Riksdag (Riksdagens 1. särskilda utskott) stated that, in the opinion of the committee, a satisfactory order would be obtained if the existing rank of fänrik and underlöjtnant was divided into two ranks, underlöjtnant and fänrik, sergeants after receiving power of attorney were awarded the rank of fänrik with retained title and fanjunkare received the rank of underlöjtnant with the position after löjtnant. General Order No. 1806/1925 regulated for the army (Note: For the Swedish Navy, letters patent applied on 18 December 1925.) the position of non-commissioned officers in accordance with guidelines issued by the Minister of Defence (Bill 1925:50). These meant that the rank of fänrik and underlöjtnant was divided into two ranks, that fanjunkare would hold a position similar to a underlöjtnant, that förvaltare (in the Swedish Army Quartermaster Corps) could under certain conditions obtain a position similar to a löjtnant and in some cases in connection with dismissal could be promoted to captain in the army (navy).

The 1930 Defence Commission (1930 års försvarskommission) proposed (SOU 1935:38) that the rank of fänrik and underlöjtnant should be merged into one rank, fänrik. The term underlöjtnant was formally abolished in 1937.

== Uniform ==
=== Uniform model 1923 ===
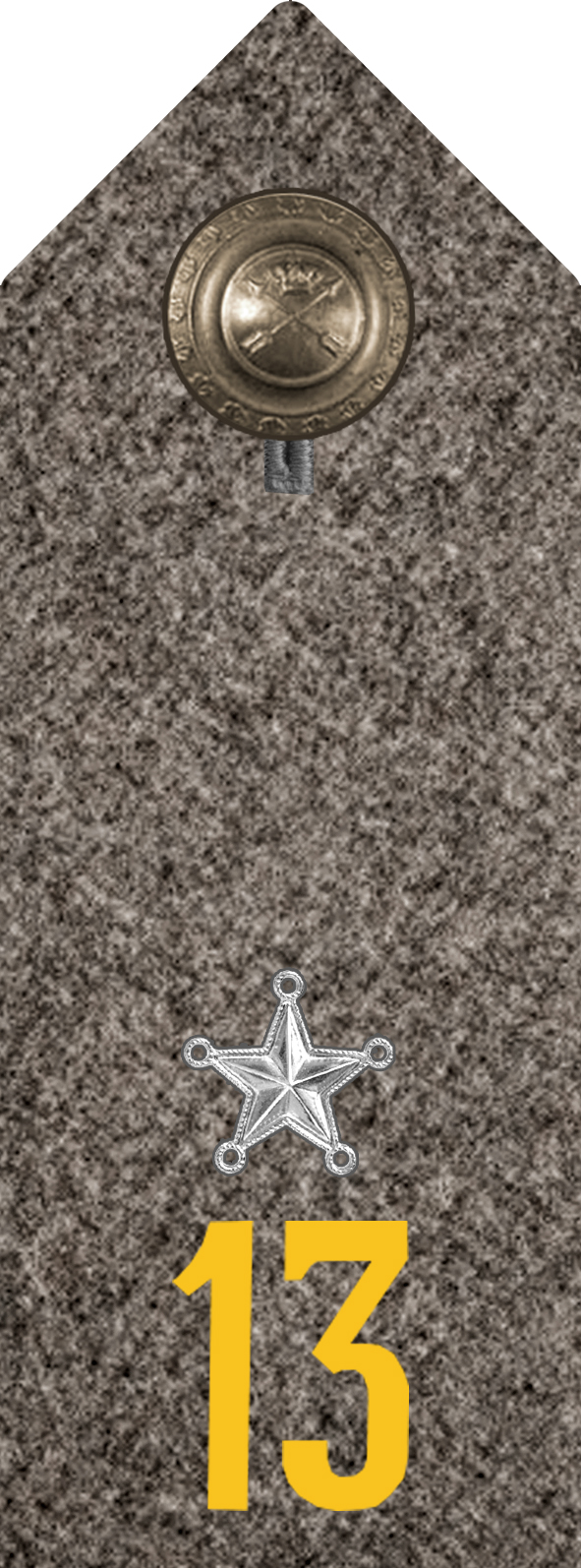
Shoulder mark on greatcoat

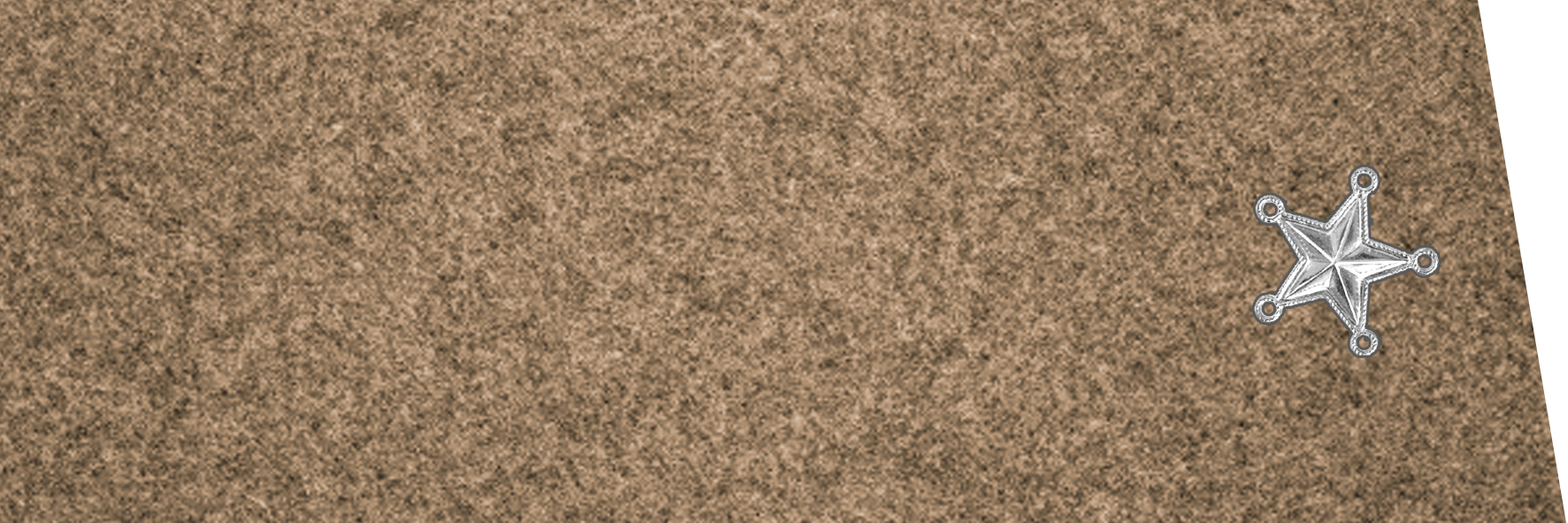
Collar patch

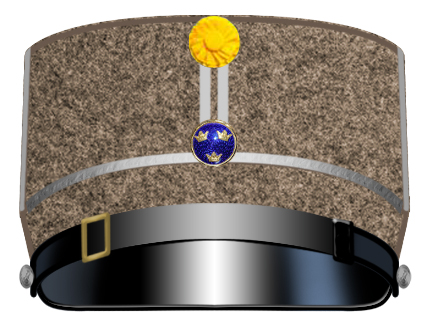
Cap m/23

=== Uniform model 1910 ===
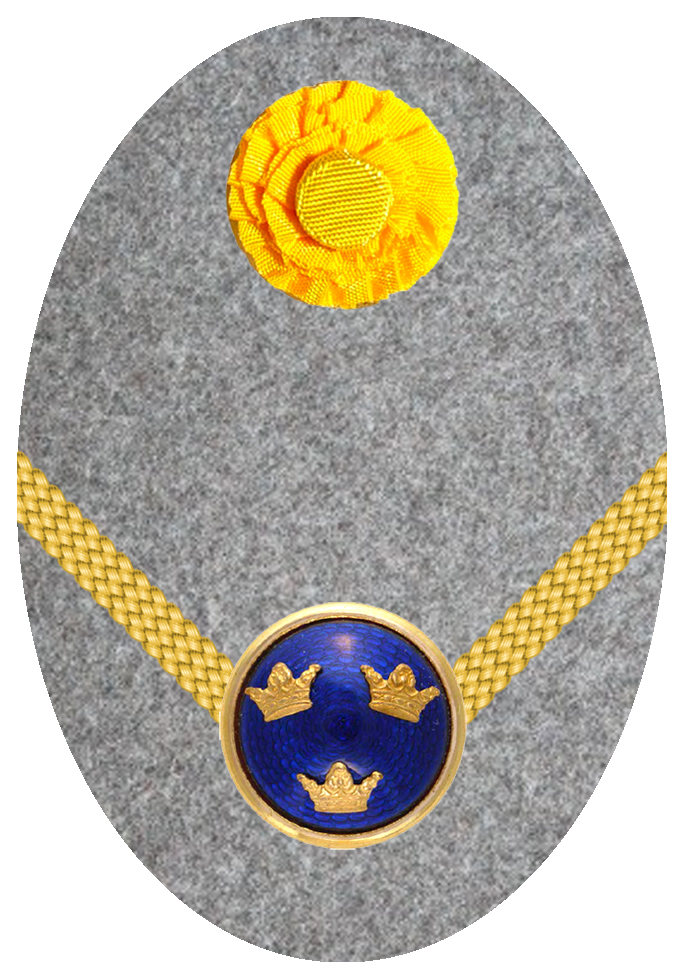
Badge m/14 for fur cap

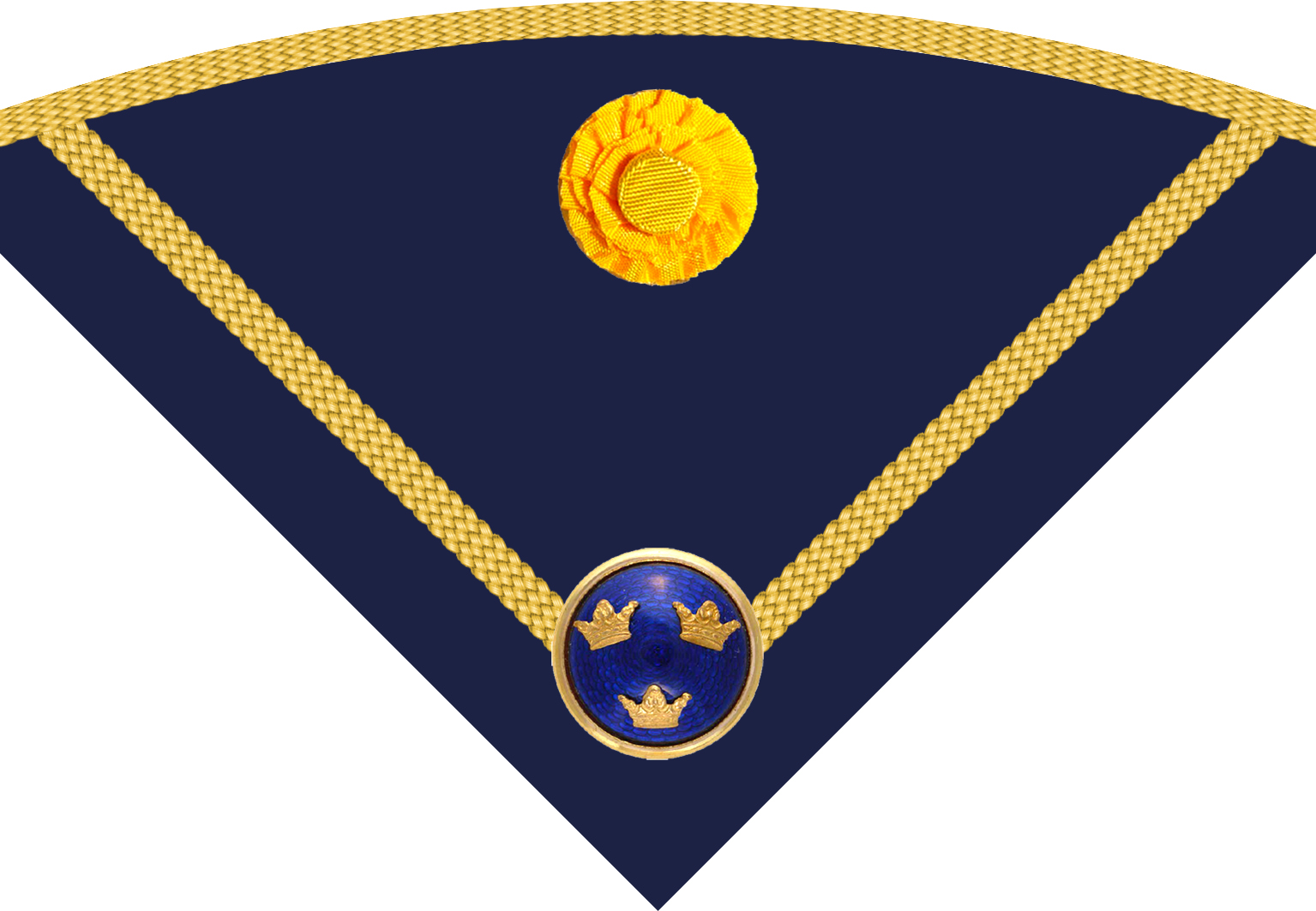
Badge m/10-14 for hat

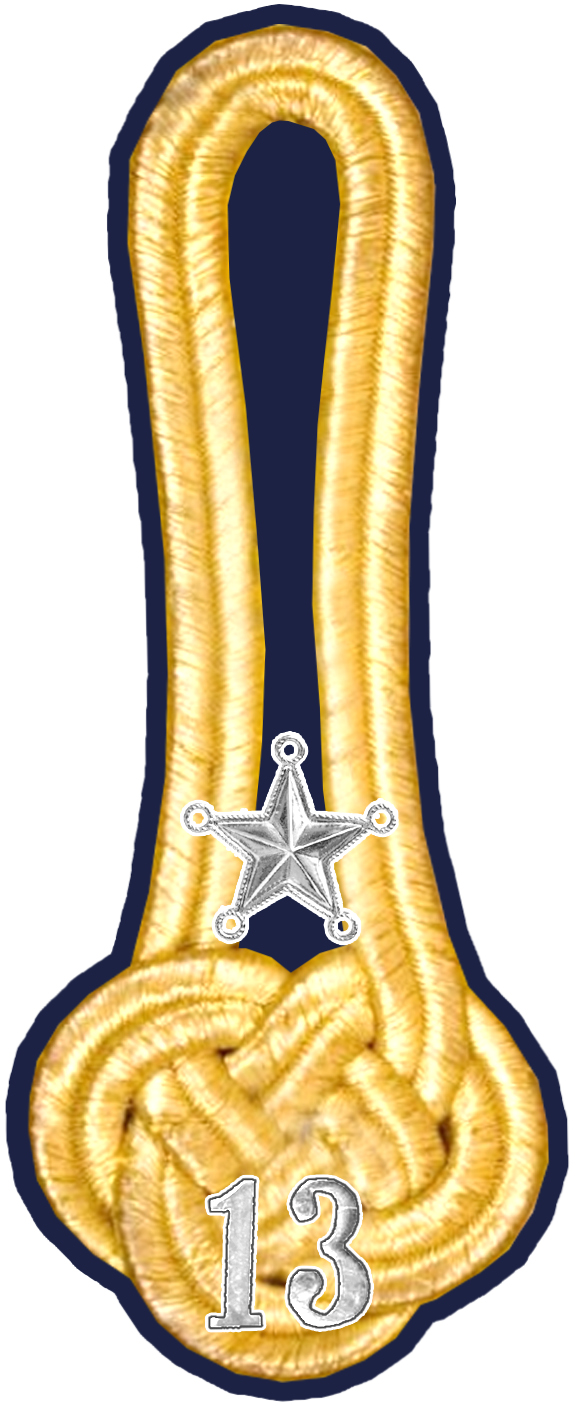
Shoulder mark m/10
