= Historical ranks of the Swedish Armed Forces =

The following article lists the historical military ranks used by personnel of the Swedish Armed Forces.

== Ranks 1901–1925 - Army ==
With the introduction of the conscript system to replace the Swedish allotment system there were initially no changes in the rank structure.

Överbefäl

Officerare

Fältmarskalk
General
Generallöjtnant
Generalmajor
Överste
Överstelöjtnant
Major
Kapten
Löjtnant
Underlöjtnant
Fänrik (from 1914)

Underbefäl

Underofficerare

Fanjunkare
Sergeant

Manskap

Befäl av manskapet

Distinktionskorpral(to 1914) Furir(from 1914)
Korpral
Vicekorpral

Menig

=== Conscripted personnel ===
Conscripts served 8–9 months in the infantry and 12 months in the cavalry and artillery. These personnel carried the rank of menig (private). Later conscripts could also be trained for and given corporal ranks.

=== Employed personnel ===
Employed personnel were divided into two groups, överbefäl and underbefäl. Överbefäl consisted of Officerare (Officers) who had a studentexamen (high school degree) and served as cadets for two years at the Karlberg Military Academy before being commissioned.

Underbefäl were divided into two groups, underofficerare and manskap (enlisted men). The category manskap consisted of the ordinary privates and corporals. The status of the underofficerare was lowered with the introduction of conscription for several reasons. The old system had consisted of the allotment regiments and enlisted troops. The enlisted troops had a much lower status than the allotment soldiers and the new conscription system copied more features from the enlisted part of the army than the allotment part. Earlier, the underofficerare were educated in their own national school and the allotment underofficerare, following French practice, were recruited directly, i.e. they did not have to serve as privates or corporals before they could advance to underofficerare. In the conscription army this practice was ended and like to enlisted troops pre 1901 the underofficerare were all recruited from the manskap category.

For the enlisted men the start of the military career was as a private after they had signed a three-year contract. The first year was a training year (volontärskola) after which the most able privates could apply (applications were accepted once a year) for corporal school (korpralskola). Those who were not admitted to the corporal school continued to serve as privates or lance corporals (vicekorpral), if they had special skills such as farrier. After their three-year service was finished they could enlist for additional periods, but if they had not been promoted before 28 years of age, they had to quit. Usually, soldiers who had failed to be accepted to corporal school after their first term (i.e. been rejected three times) would choose to serve for one or two years more at most, since the pay and conditions of privates were poor. The main reason such individuals did not quit directly after three years was that after five years of service(later shortened to four) the privates were eligible for extra benefits, e.g., priority for employment in post offices, government-owned railways, police, etc.

Those who were accepted to corporal school were promoted to vicekorpral and after one year of training promoted to korpral. Advancement to corporal meant that one had to serve one additional year (i.e., four years if the corporal did not re enlist). Corporals could apply to furirskola, a one-year training, after which they were promoted to furir. Korpral and furir worked as instructors and squad leaders and had a mandatory retirement age of 32. Enlisted personnel did not receive pension after their service, but they were entitled to severance pay upon discharge.

A furir who had graduated the furirskola with high marks could apply for underofficersskola, after which they were promoted to sergeant. After two years as sergeant they were given a fullmakt (warrant) and were guaranteed employment until retirement, after which they received pension. Underofficerare were responsible for the training of the conscripts and recruits and could also work as platoon leaders or deputy platoon leaders.

== Ranks 1901–1925 - Navy ==
=== Fleet forces ===
Överbefäl
Officerare

- Amiral
- Viceamiral
- Konteramiral
- Kommendör
- Kommendörkapten of the 1st/2nd rank
- Kapten
- Löjtnant
- Underlöjtnant
- Fänrik (from 1914 onward)

Underbefäl

Underofficerare

Fanjunkare
Sergeant

Manskap

Befäl av manskapet

Distinktionskorpral(to 1914) Furir(from 1914)
Korpral
Vicekorpral

Menig

=== Naval Infantry and Coastal Defense Artillery ===
Överbefäl
Officerare

General
Generallöjtnant
Generalmajor
Överste
Överstelöjtnant
Major
Kapten
Löjtnant
Underlöjtnant
Fänrik (from 1914)

Underbefäl
Underofficerare (av 1. graden)

- Styckjunkare
- Flaggjunkare
- Flaggmaskinist
- Flaggrustmästare
- Stabstrumpetare

Underofficerare (av 2. graden)

- Sergeant
- Maskinist
- Rustmästare
- Torpedmästare
- Stabstrumpetare

Manskap

Befäl av manskapet

Distinktionskorpral(to 1914) Furir(from 1914)
Korpral
Vicekorpral

Menig

== Ranks 1926–1952- Army and Air Force ==
Officerare

- Fältmarskalk
- General
- Generallöjtnant
- Generalmajor
- Överste
- Överstelöjtnant
- Major
- Kapten
- Löjtnant
- Underlöjtnant (abolished 1937)
- Fänrik

Underofficerare

- Förvaltare(from 1936)
- Fanjunkare
- Sergeant

Manskap

Underbefäl

Överfurir(from 1942)
Furir
Korpral
Vicekorpral

Menig

=== Employed personnel ===
In a reform 1926 the Underofficer category was split from underbefäl to form their own corps. A centralised education was reintroduced with the Swedish Army Non-Commissioned Officer School (warrant officer school of the Army) replacing the local education of underofficerare which had taken place since the introduction of the conscript army. In addition to military subjects, the school also gave the students a civilian secondary education. The tjänsteställning (seniority) of fanjunkare was raised to that equal of underlöjtnant. When Förvaltare was introduced in 1936 the rank was given a tjänsteställning equal to löjtnant. Thus many of the grievances regarding the lowered status in 1901 were addressed. In 1949 the possibility to work as underbefäl (manskap higher than menig) on similar terms as officers and warrant officers was introduced. That is, not all corporals had to re-enlist regularly and quit while in their 30s but could work until retirement.

=== Conscripted personnel ===
During World War II, there was a serious shortage of officers because of drastic cuts in the 1920s. It was therefore decided to introduce conscript warrant officers(underofficerare). Later conscript officers were introduced with ranks of fänrik to kapten.

== Ranks used 1926–1952 - Navy ==
=== Fleet forces ===
Överbefäl
Officerare

- Amiral
- Viceamiral
- Konteramiral
- Kommendör
- Kommendörkapten of the 1st/2nd rank
- Kapten
- Löjtnant
- Underlöjtnant (abolished in 1937)
- Fänrik

Underbefäl

Underofficerare

Förvaltare(from 1936)
Fanjunkare
Sergeant

Manskap

Befäl av manskapet

Överfurir(from 1942)
Furir
Korpral
Vicekorpral

Sjöman

=== Naval Infantry and Coastal Defense Artillery ===
Överbefäl
Officerare

General
Generallöjtnant
Generalmajor
Överste
Överstelöjtnant
Major
Kapten
Löjtnant
Underlöjtnant (abolished in 1937)
Fänrik

Underbefäl

Underofficerare

Förvaltare(from 1936)
Fanjunkare
Sergeant

Manskap

Befäl av manskapet

Överfurir(from 1942)
Furir
Korpral
Vicekorpral

Menig

== Ranks 1953–1972 - Army and Air Force ==
Officerare

- Fältmarskalk (Abolished 1972)
- General
- Generallöjtnant
- Generalmajor
- Överste (with higher pay)
- Överste
- Överstelöjtnant
- Major
- Kapten
- Löjtnant
- Fänrik

Underofficerare

- Förvaltare
- Fanjunkare
- Sergeant

Underbefäl

- Rustmästare(from 1957, abolished 1972)
- Överfurir
- Furir
- Korpral
- Vicekorpral(trainee rank)

Menig

=== Employed personnel ===
In 1953 the enlistment system was abolished. Instead of starting a military career by enlisting for three years as a private, one was employed as junior NCO in the new underbefäl corps directly after the conscript service with the rank of korpral. (Such an option was not open to all conscripts.) In a reform in 1960 the tjänsteställning of förvaltare was increased to that between kapten and löjtnant, and förvaltare were given the possibility to become company commanders.

== Ranks 1953–1972 - Navy ==
=== Fleet forces ===
Överbefäl
Officerare

- Amiral
- Viceamiral
- Konteramiral
- Kommendör (with higher pay)
- Kommendör
- Kommendörkapten of the 1st/2nd rank
- Kapten
- Löjtnant
- Fänrik

Underbefäl

Underofficerare

- Flaggunderofficer
- Förvaltare
- Fanjunkare
- Sergeant

Underbefäl

- Högbåtsman
- Rustmästare(from 1957, abolished 1972)
- Överfurir
- Furir
- Korpral
- Vicekorpral(trainee rank)

Menig

- Sjöman

=== Naval Infantry and Coastal Defense Artillery ===
Officerare

- General
- Generallöjtnant
- Generalmajor
- Överste (with higher pay)
- Överste
- Överstelöjtnant
- Major
- Kapten
- Löjtnant
- Fänrik

Underofficerare

- Förvaltare
- Fanjunkare
- Sergeant

Underbefäl

- Rustmästare(from 1957, abolished 1972)
- Överfurir
- Furir
- Korpral
- Vicekorpral(trainee rank)

Menig

- Menig

== Ranks 1972–1983 - Army and Air Force ==
Regementsofficerare

- General
- Generallöjtnant
- Generalmajor
- Överste av 1. graden
- Överste
- Överstelöjtnant
- Major
- Kapten
- Löjtnant

Kompaniofficerare

- Kapten
- Löjtnant
- Fänrik

Plutonsofficerare

- Fanjunkare
- Sergeant

Gruppbefäl

- Överfurir
- Furir
- Korpral

Menig

=== Employed personnel ===
In 1972, the three corps were renamed; officers who had studied at the Military Academy were now known as regementsofficerare and started at the rank of löjtnant instead of fänrik. The Swedish Army Non-Commissioned Officer School was renamed Swedish Army Company Officer School and those who were trained there started with a rank of fänrik and were joined with the former underofficerare in the category Kompaniofficerare(Company officers). The former warrant officers were given ranks fänrik to kapten based on their time in service. Kompaniofficerare had the same rank insignia and tjänsteställning as ordinary officers, however they could not advance further in rank. Someone who had been a sergeant for more than 7 years became Kapten but could not be promoted to major. The tjänsteställning of the ranks sergeant and fanjunkare was reduced and the ranks were given to former underbefäl with long time in service in a new category Plutonsofficerare. Junior underbefäl were called gruppbefäl and used the ranks previously used by underbefäl. There was still several separate corps with different educational background, different duties and they did not use the same mess, even though they in some cases shared the same rank.

== Ranks 1983-2008 - Army and Air Force ==
Yrkesofficerare

General

Generallöjtnant

Generalmajor

Brigadgeneral (from 2000)

Överste av 1. graden (no new appointments since 2000)

Överste

Överstelöjtnant

Major

Kapten

Löjtnant

Fänrik

Värnpliktigt befäl

Fanjunkare

Sergeant

Överfurir

Furir

Korpral

Menig

=== Employed personnel ===
In 1983 the Consolidated Officer System was introduced, in which the different corps were merged to one(Yrkesofficerare) and former plutonsofficerare were also given officer ranks. The separate paths were abolished and all officers had the same education and training and started as fänrik.

=== Conscripted personnel ===
Conscript NCOs were continued and since all holders of the ranks were conscripts the name was changed to Värnpliktigt befäl (Värnplikt = conscription) After 1991 only temporary appointments were made to the ranks överfurir and fanjunkare.

== History of other ranks ==
These historical enlisted and NCO ranks of Sweden comprise the contracted ordinary ranks in the Swedish Armed Forces and their respective insignia. The length of contract is currently restricted to two years due to the employment protection law (LAS).

=== Menig ===
Rank for recruits undertaking training.

Army	Air force	Navy
No insignia		

=== Menig 1:a klass ===
Menig 1:a klass is a new rank introduced 2009 for soldiers who have spent at least one year in training and service. Bars will increase by one after each year in service, up to a maximum of four bars.

Army	Air force	Navy

==== Prior to 2009 ====
Insignias prior 2009
Army	Air force	Navy	Notes
			Privates in the Army carried the unit type symbol such as infantry, cavalry, signal, engineering, artillery, air-defense, supply, or armored instead of a rank insignia.

=== Vicekorpral ===
Vicekorpral was introduced in 2009. How to obtain the rank and what it represents have not yet been clearly defined.

Army	Air force	Navy

==== Prior to 1972 ====
The rank existed until 1972 as a trainee rank for conscripts who were undertaking training to become deputy squad leaders or squad leaders.

Insignias prior 1972
Army	Air force	Navy

=== Korpral ===
Korpral used to be a trainee rank for conscripts prior the rank reform 2009 and the change to a pure professional armed forces in 2010. The rank was obtained by conscript commanders after serving a certain time (usually 4 months) and passing the mandatory tests (such as physical, weapons, enemy identification and tactics etc.).

Army	Air force	Navy

==== Prior to 2009 ====
Insignias before 2009
Army	Air force	Navy

==== 1600 - 1700 ====
A korpral of the infantry was in charge of a 24 men strong formation called korpralskap during the Swedish allotment system. The korpralskap consisted of four rote (teams) of 6 men each. Each rote was led by a rote master.

==== Reform 1833/37 ====
Korpral was considered an under-officer rank in the Cavalry before the reorganization 1833/37 that elevated holders of the rank Korpral to Sergeants and lowered the status of the rank.

=== Konstapel ===
A corresponding artillery and air-defense rank that was established in 1500. The rank was discontinued in 1972.

=== Distinktionskorpral ===
Established 1858 as a rank above Korpral. In 1912 the rank was discontinued and holders of the rank were elevated to Furir.

==== Sweden: Reform 1972 ====
- Holders of the rank Korpral were elevated to Furir.
- Holders of the rank Vicekorpral were elevated to Korpral.
- Vicekopral was discontinued.

=== Sergeant ===
Sergeant is a rank for soldiers in the cavalry, deputy squanders in regular units and is being used as a rank for deputy squad leaders in the home defense organization(Hemvarnet). The rank was obtained by conscript platoon-commanders (PB, plutonsbefäl) when finishing their conscript service (usually after 12 months). How to obtain the rank in the newly formed professional armed forces is not yet clearly defined.

Army	Air force	Navy

==== 2009 Furir changes name to Sergeant ====
The rank Sergeant changed name to First Sergeant and Furir to Sergeant.

=== Furir ===
Furir (from French fourrier means the person responsible for the feeding) was a Swedish military rank above Korpral and Sergeant (now First Sergeant) awarded after completing the training for company commander (KB, kompanibefäl), level 8 conscript training (usually after 15 months). Level 8 means that the holder has received some basic leadership training at team leader level. Riflemen, MP men and deputy team-leaders (5 men) of cavalry and riflemen at the Nordic Battle Group typically have this rank [ref: K3, K3, K1, NBG]. Other holders of the rank are the deputy team-leaders of the Home Guard.

Army	Air force	Navy

==== Origin 1600 ====
The responsibility of a furir was to arrange for housing as well as the distribution of food in a Company.

==== 1833/37 ====
The rank becomes the lowest underofficers rank.

==== 1875 ====
Holders of the rank Furir were elevated to sergeant and the rank was removed.

==== 1914 ====
The rank was reintroduced, not categorized as underofficer, but as a rank for senior squad leaders and instructors.

==== 1944 ====
Establishment of the rank Överfurir above Furir. The rank corresponds to the newly introduced rank Swedish rank First Sergeant. Removed 1983 as a professional rank.

==== 2009 ====
The rank changes name to Sergeant

== Rank inflation ==
=== Reform 1972 - Rank inflation phase I ===
Prior to 1972, military personnel were divided into three categories Underbefäl (non-commissioned officers), Underofficerare (warrant officers) and Officerare (commissioned officers). The reform established a four-career-path system with four categories as described below and carried out major promotions of most personnel below the rank Överstelöjtnant.

The Underbefäl category was split into two categories

- gruppbefäl to include

korpral - former vicekorpral
furir - former korpral
överfurir - former furir

- plutonsofficerare to include

sergeant - former överfurir
fanjunkare - former elderly överfurir and rustmästare

The Underofficer category was renamed kompaniofficerare to include

fänrik - former sergeant and fanjunkare with less than 3 years of service
löjtnant - former sergeant and fanjunkare with 3-7 years of service
kapten - former sergeant, fanjunkare with a minimum of 7 years of service and förvaltare

The Officer category was renamed regementsofficerare to include

löjtnant - Löjtnant with less than 3 years of service and former fänrik
kapten - kapten with less than 11 years of service and former Löjtnant with 3-11 years of service
major - former kapten and löjtnant with a minimum of 11 years of service
överstelöjtnant - överstelöjtnant and former major
higher ranks

=== Reform 1983 - Rank inflation phase II ===
All categories were merged into one professional officer category with the lowest rank set to fänrik. Furir, överfurir, sergeant and fanjunkare were removed as a professional ranks. Holders of the rank fanjunkare were promoted to löjtnant and the rest to fänrik.

== See also ==
- Military ranks of the Swedish Armed Forces
