= Swedish Armed Forces School for Secondary Education =

- Försvarets läroverk Försvarets gymnasieskola
- Active: 1943–1982
- Country: Sweden
- Allegiance: Swedish Armed Forces
- Branch: Joint
- Type: School
- Role: Secondary education
- Garrison/HQ: Uppsala

Insignia
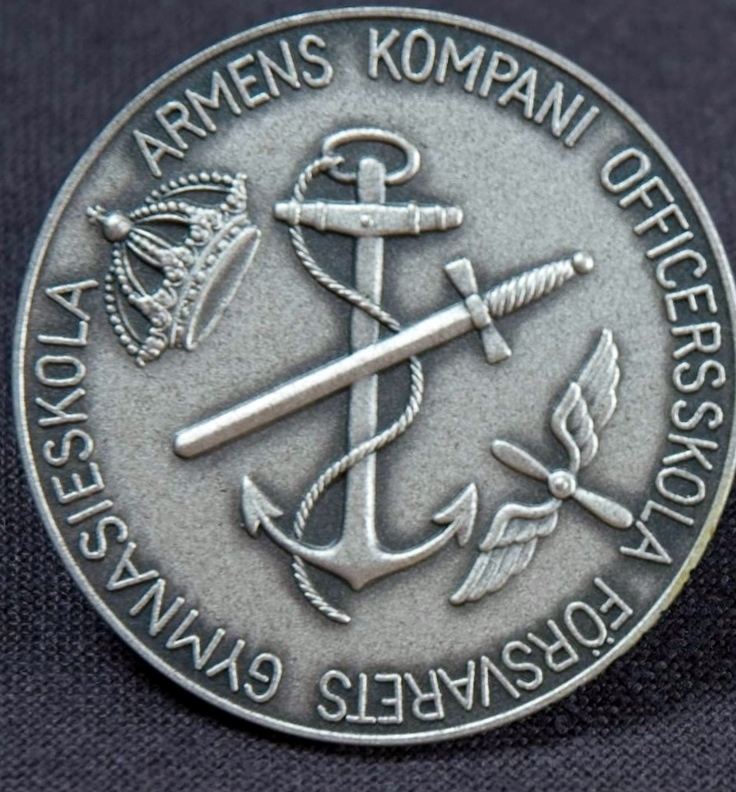
- Commemorative medal

Swedish Armed Forces School for Secondary Education (Swedish: Försvarets läroverk, FL, later Försvarets gymnasieskola, FGS) was a joint school unit of the Swedish Armed Forces which operated in various forms the years 1943–1982. The school was located in Uppsala Garrison in Uppsala.

== History ==
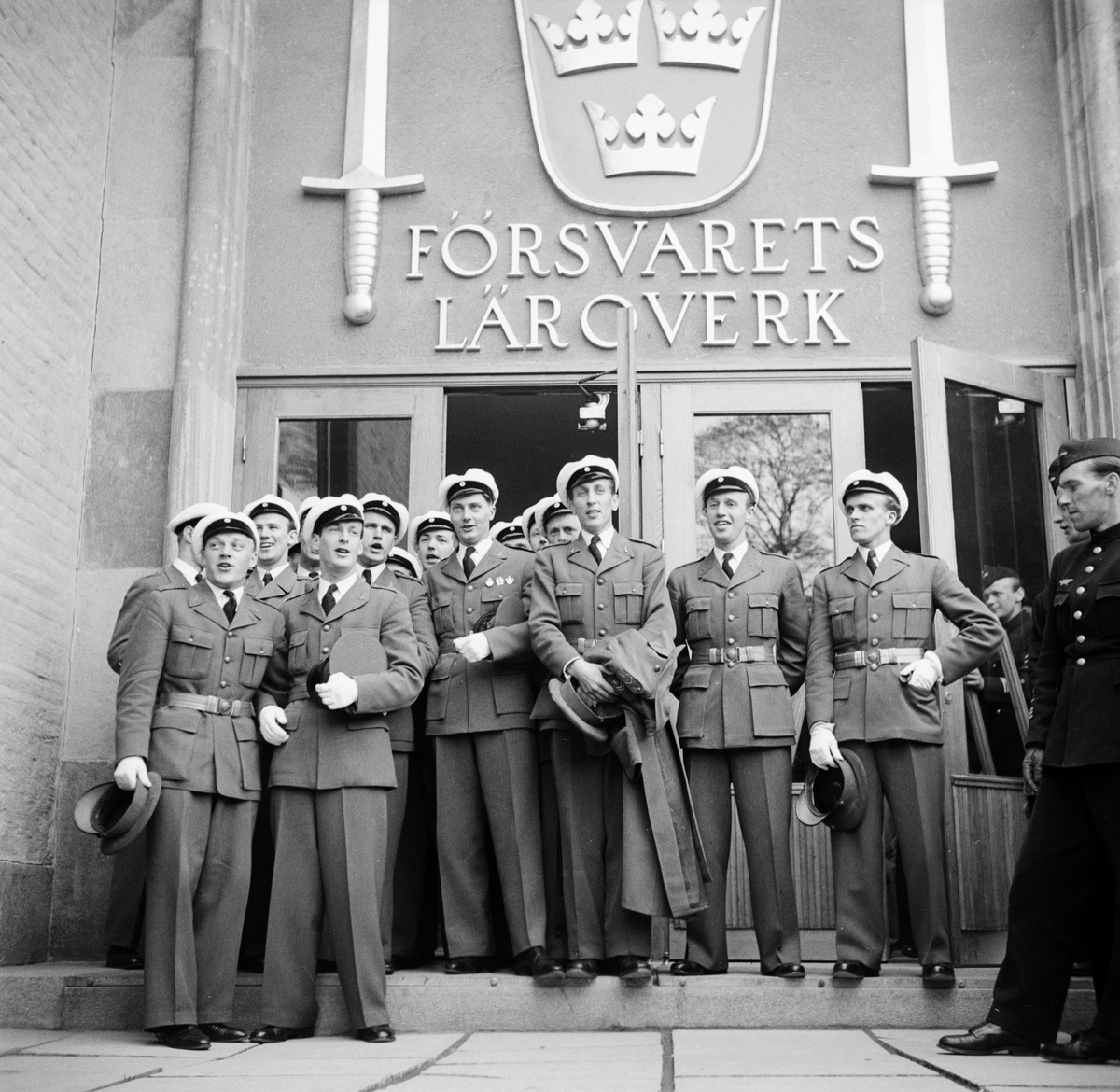
Graduation from the school in 1946.

As a result of the fact that the public school system could not meet the Swedish Armed Forces needs of education in general subjects, the Swedish Army Non-Commissioned Officer School was established in 1926. This created the conditions for the Swedish Army's military personnel to receive a comprehensive supplementary education in general subjects. Corresponding training was lacking in the Swedish Navy and the Swedish Air Force. As a result of various investigations, like the 1941 Defense Investigation, the Swedish Armed Forces School for Secondary Education (Försvarets läroverk, FL) was established in 1943. The school was common to the entire Swedish Armed Forces. The teaching in general subjects that had been conducted at AUS so far was transferred to FL. Its duties were to "provide permanent staff and conscripts from the Army, Navy and Air Force, the general education required to gain employment as an officer or non-commissioned officer on active duty as well as the knowledge of technical subjects relevant to the service in certain special military branches." In addition, the school would provide teaching for an academic certificate from a Realskola (realexamen).

Passing the school was made to eligibility requirements for appointment to petty officers' school. One of the study programs led as before to a limited studentexamen at the AUS. This program was now also opened for conscripts who had passed the officer candidate school. For students at FL, a boarding school was established at AUS. The students stood in military terms under the command of the commanding officer of the AUS and he was also responsible for their physical training, healthcare and defense information. When the fältflygare (sergeant pilot) category was established in 1946, parts of the Air Force's education in general subjects were transferred to schools in the Air Force's own direction. These were placed in Ljungbyhed in 1960. The fältflygare received the same education in general subjects as the students of the Air Force's non-commissioned officers program. Supplementary secondary education in mathematics and physics for the Air Force's regimental officers had existed since the mid-1960s and supplementary secondary education for its future company officers from 1973. At the FL, there was initially a technical program designed for the training of technical staff in all military branches. After a few years, the Army and the Air Force took care of their own technical education and, from 1950, the technical program switched to become solely naval. In 1956 the technical program was moved to the Karlskrona Naval Schools (Karlskrona örlogsskolor, KÖS), where it was called the Swedish Navy Technical School (Marinens tekniska skola, MTS).

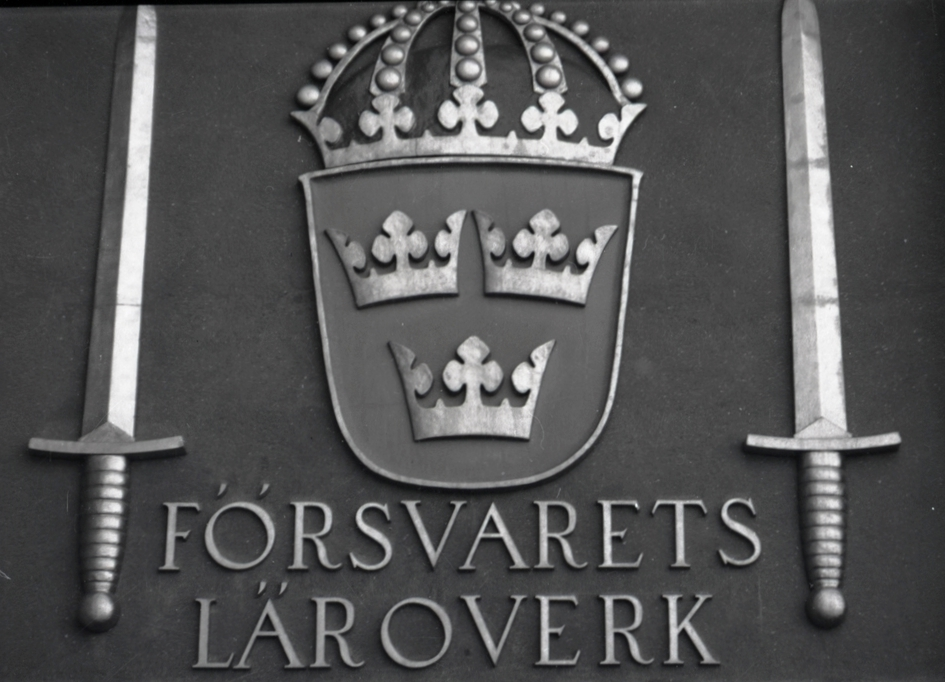
Entrance to the school in Uppsala.

During the 1960s, education at the three schools was adapted to the changes that the secondary education school underwent in the public school system. In connection with this, FL changed its name on 1 July 1971 to Försvarets gymnasieskola (FGS). As a result of the new eligibility rules in general subjects which were established by the government in June 1977, a secondary education two-term course for platoon officer candidates in the Army who had no secondary education or only limited such was carried out as of January 1978, instead of the supplementary and additional training which was previously granted. The education included two classes on a two-year course in the subjects Swedish, English, social studies and natural sciences, as well as one class in mathematics. Compared with the secondary school's two-year social program, the FGS's timetable took more hours in natural science and gymnastics, as well as fewer hours in social studies and social law. In order to be allowed to apply to the Swedish Army Company Officer School and corresponding education within the other military branches, an education was given which corresponded to the secondary school's two-year social program. FGS also had psychology as well as voice and speech as compulsory subjects. For regimental officer candidates with only compulsory school (grundskola) competence, comparable education was conducted as for company officer candidates so that teaching in Swedish corresponded to the requirements for three-year upper secondary school (gymnasieskola). In order to be allowed to apply to the army's regimental officer course or to equivalent education in other military branches, education was also given according to the curriculum of the upper secondary school's three-year natural science or social science program. The difference was that the number of hours in gymnastics had been increased.

For the regimental officer candidates who only needed supplementary Swedish and German organized distance education were arranged, which was a combination of correspondence studies and classroom-based teaching. This meant that 3-5 days of intensive studies with teacher guidance were conducted at FGS every month. Then the assignments were also prepared for the coming home study period, during which the students were able to contact the teacher by telephone in their respective subjects. During the home study period, the students were involved in the education work in their military units but had 25% of the service time spent on studying. Other education that occurred was studies during one term in mathematics and physics in a natural science program or a four-year technical program. These studies were intended, among other things, for regimental officers who lacked qualification in mathematics which was required for entry into the Artillery and Engineer Regiment Officer School. The number of students fell significantly in the later years of the 1970s. In the 1971/72 financial year, the number of students was approximately 425 while the 1977/78 financial year was approximately 225 students at FGS. The reason for this was, among other things, that more and more had the civil competence required when they applied. In addition, the government had increasingly given dispensers for studies in ones hometown. The number of students on 1 January 1979 was 202. The number of teachers at FGS with full-time service was 15 and with part-time service 11.

The school was in military terms subordinate to the Swedish Army Non-Commissioned Officer School and from 1972 the Swedish Army Company Officer School. The school's operations ended on 1 July 1982.

== Locations and training areas ==
When the school was established and formed in 1943, it was initially placed in the major establishment at Dag Hammarskjölds väg 10-18 in Uppsala, where the Swedish Army Non-Commissioned Officer School was located, and later also the Försvarets tolkskola. On 19 September 1944, the school was transferred to a newly built building at Dag Hammarskjölds väg 31. After the school was dissolved, it was taken over by the civil education in Uppsala.

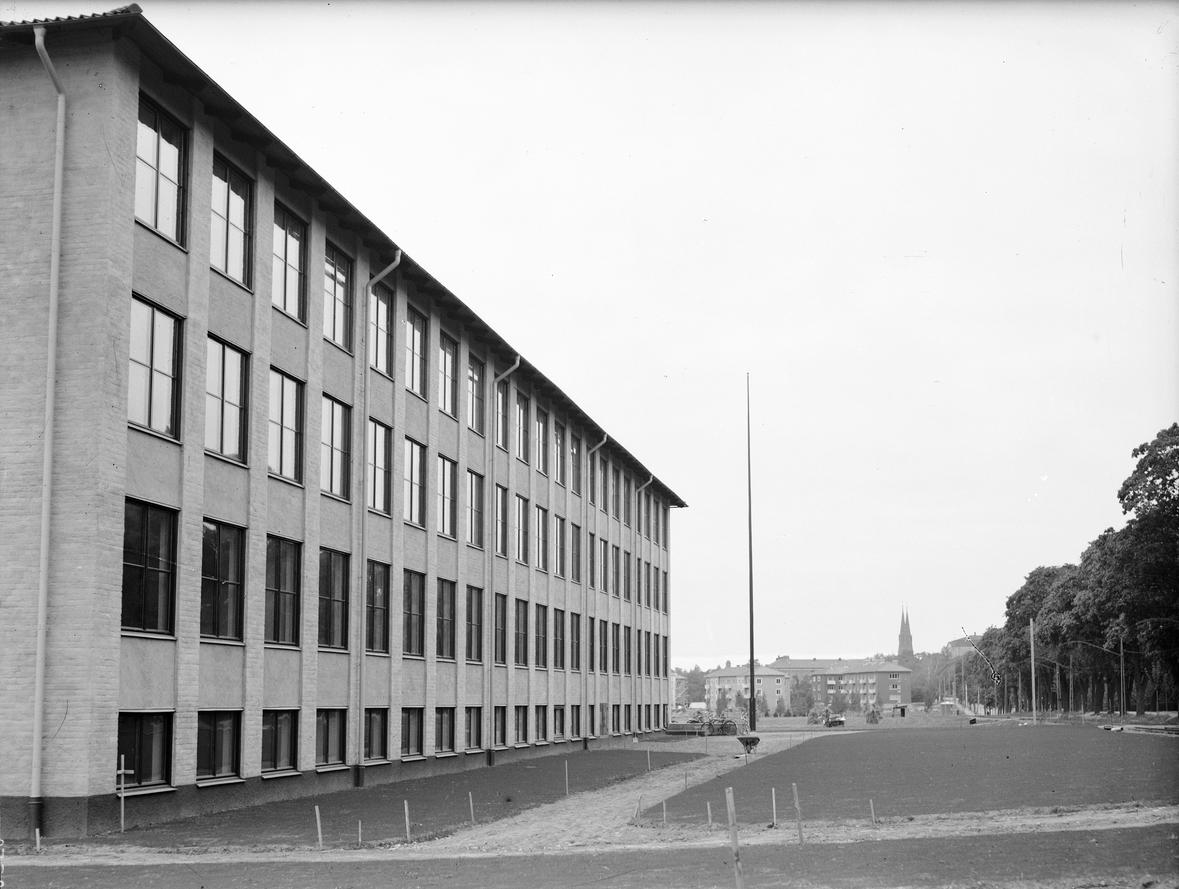
Barracks in October 1944

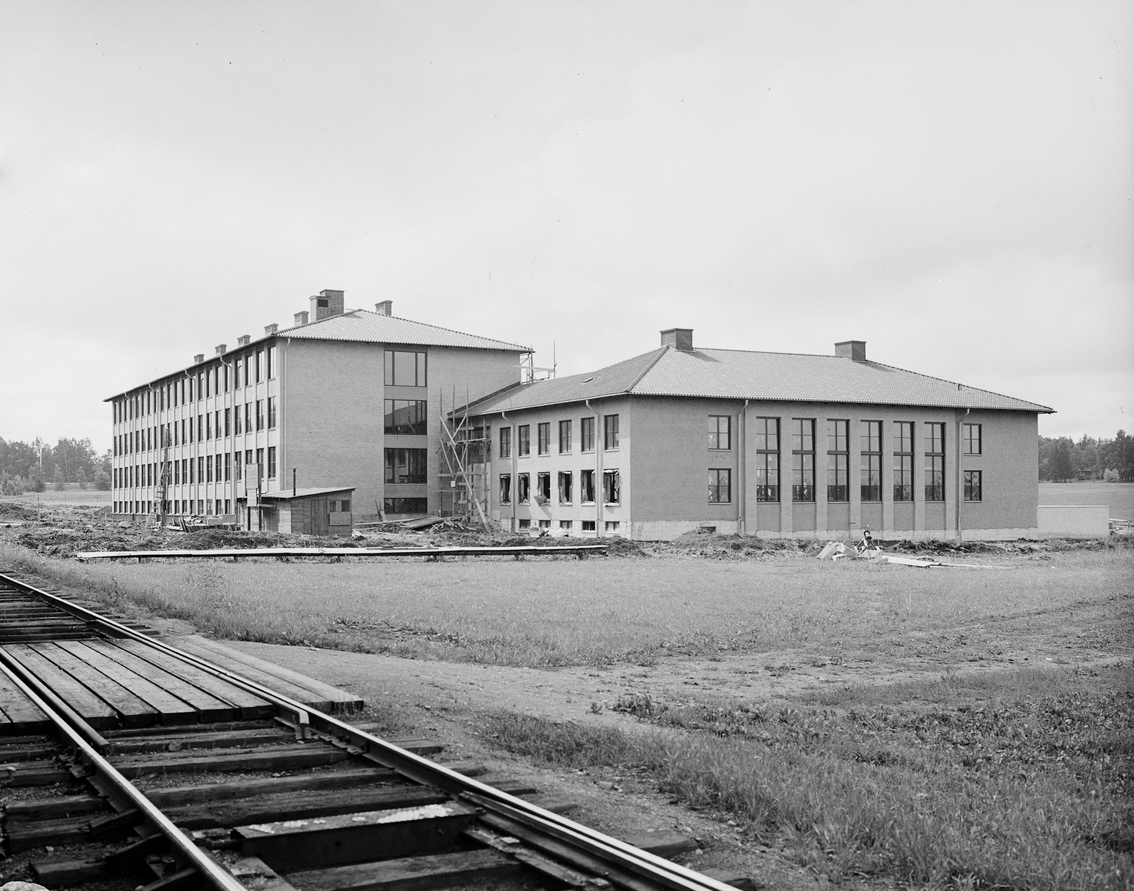
Barracks in 1944

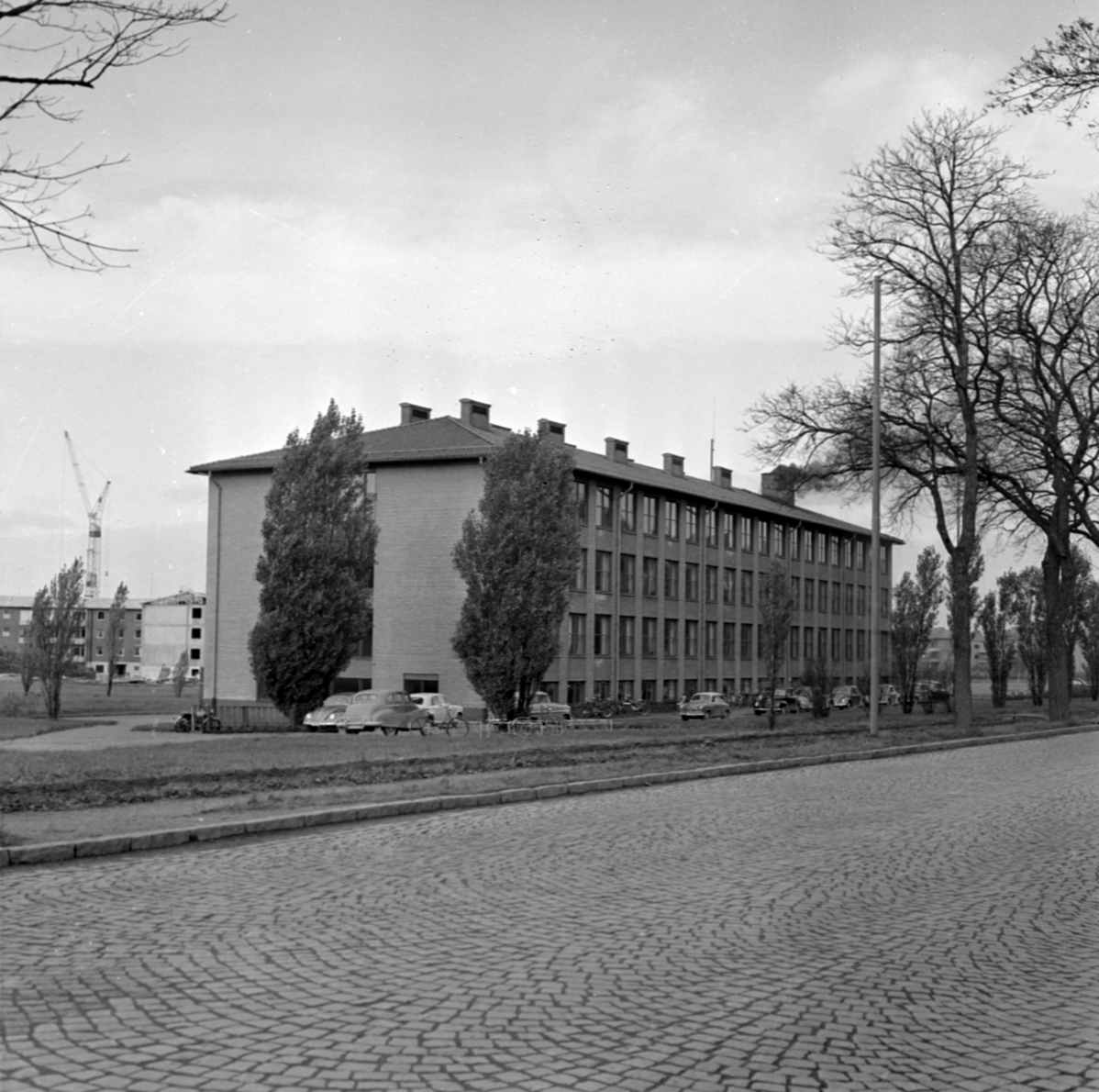
Barracks in January 1958

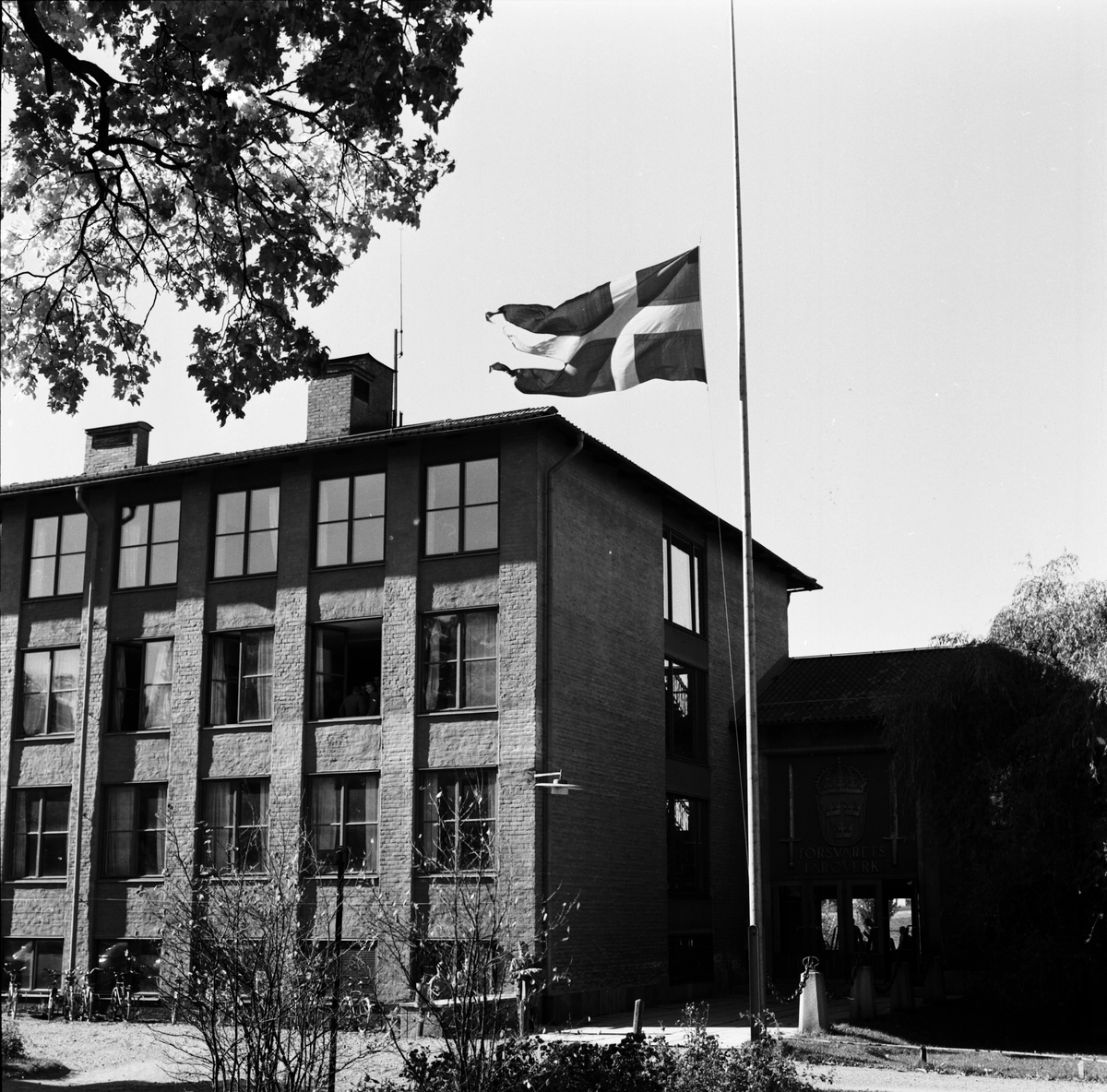
Barracks in 1961

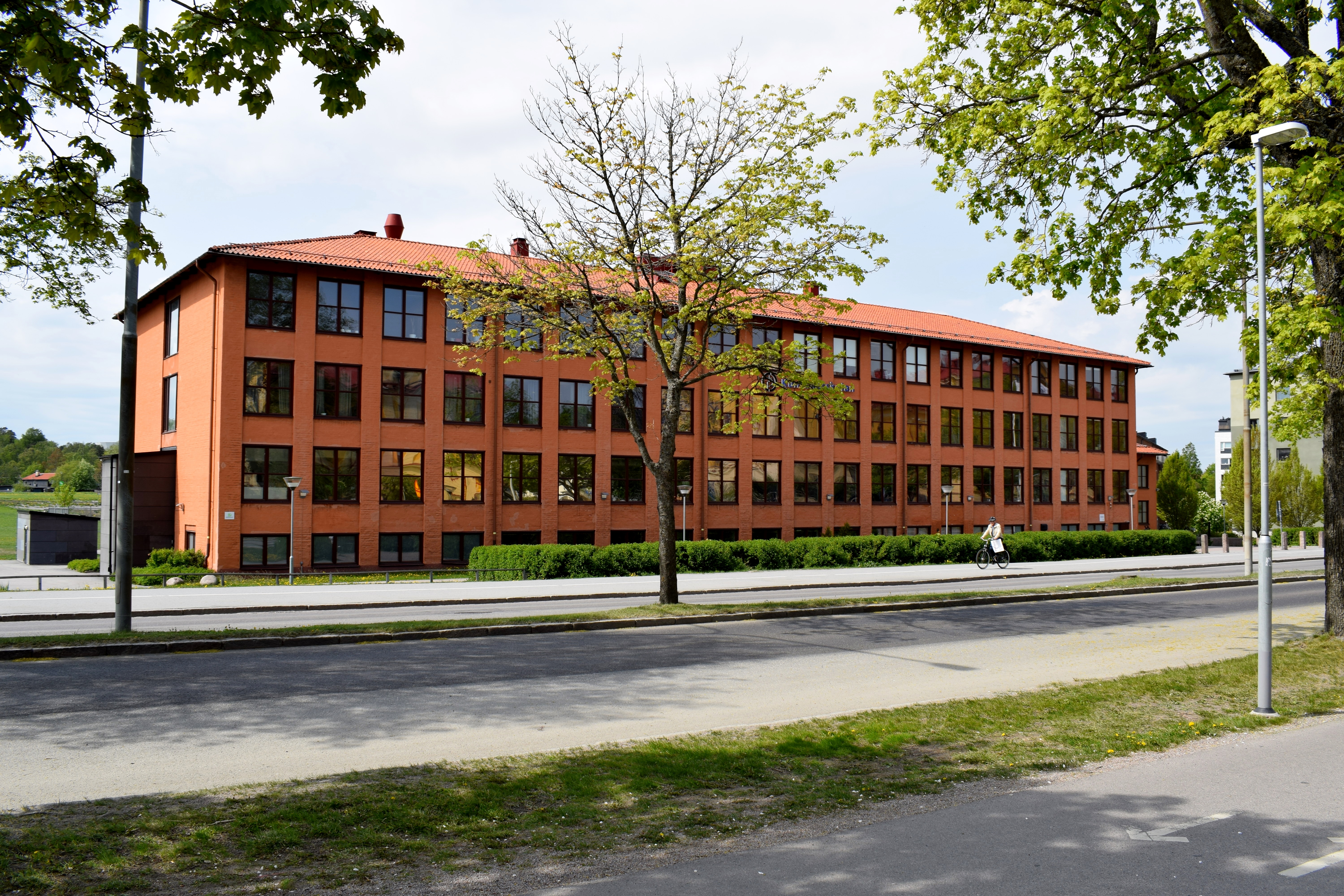
Barracks in 2019

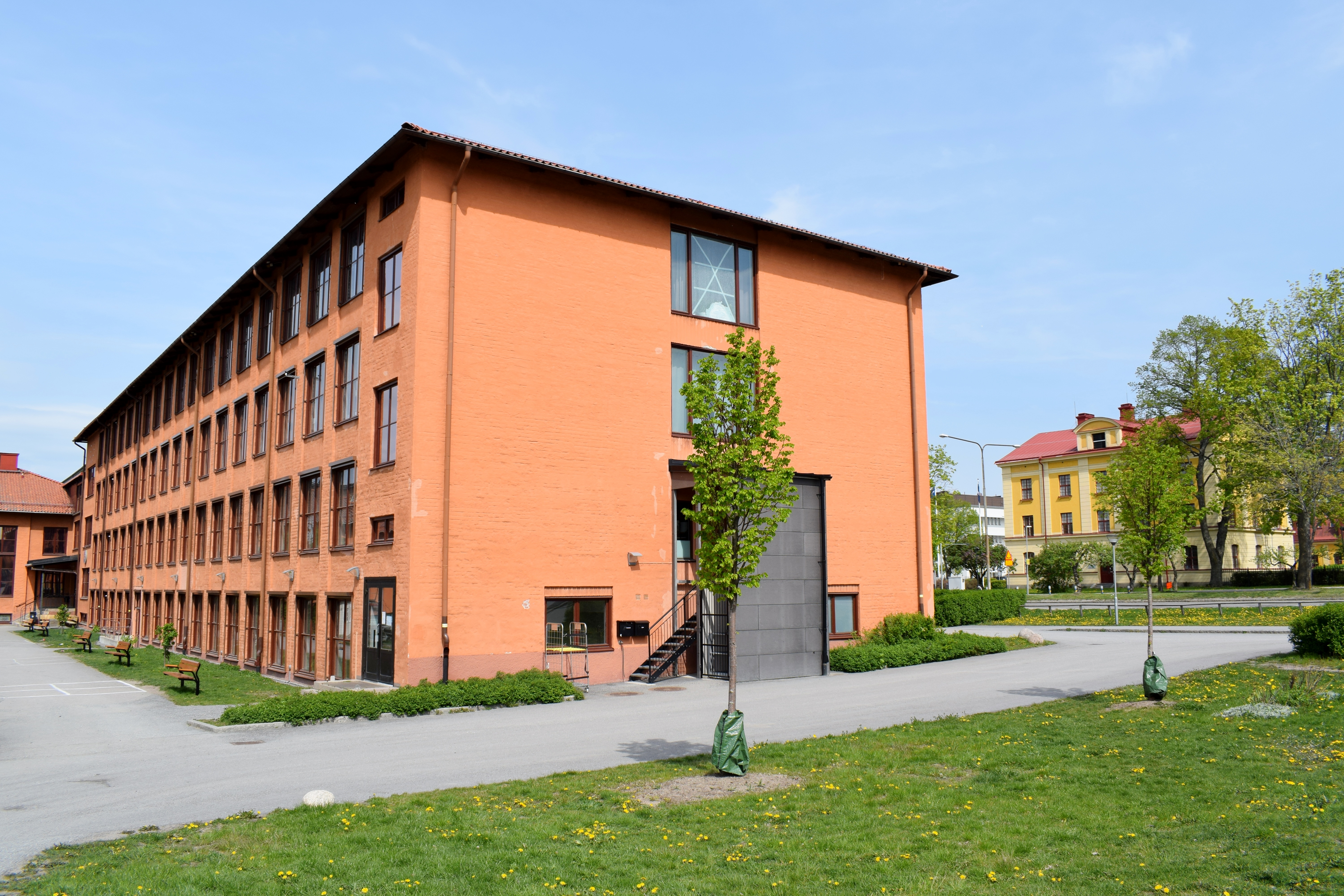
Barracks in 2019

== Names, designations and locations ==
Name	Translation	From		To
Försvarets läroverk	[Swedish] Armed Forces School for Secondary Education	1943-07-01	–	1971-06-31
Försvarets gymnasieskola	[Swedish] Armed Forces School for Secondary Education	1971-07-01	–	1982-06-30
Designation		From		To
FL		1943-07-01	–	1971-06-31
FGS		1971-07-01	–	1982-06-30
Location		From		To
Uppsala Garrison		1943-07-01	–	1982-06-30
