= Uppland Artillery Regiment =

- Upplands artilleriregemente
- Active: 1894–1927
- Country: Sweden
- Allegiance: Swedish Armed Forces
- Branch: Swedish Army
- Type: Artillery
- Size: Regiment
- Part of: 4th Military District (1833–1867); 5th Military District (1867–1893); 4th Army Division (1893–1901); IV Army Division (1902–1927)
- Garrison/HQ: Uppsala
- Patron: Saint Barbara
- Colors: Garnet
- March: "Artilleri V" (Ström) (Note: The march was adopted c. 1915. In 1952, the march was taken over by the Bergslagen Artillery Regiment, and from 2000 by the Artillery Regiment.)
- Anniversaries: 4 December (Note: 4 December is saint day of Saint Barbara.)

Uppland Artillery Regiment (Swedish: Upplands artilleriregemente), designation A 5, was a Swedish Army artillery unit which operated between 1894 and 1927. The unit was based in Uppsala Garrison in Uppsala, Sweden.

== History ==
Uppland Artillery Regiment or as it was originally called, 2nd Svea Artillery Regiment, was raised on 1 October 1894 by an amalgamation of two batteries from 1st Svea Artillery Regiment and two from Wendes Artillery Regiment. The 2nd Svea Artillery Regiment remained in Stockholm until 1901, when it was relocated to Stockholmsvägen, since the 1960s known as Dag Hammarskjölds väg, in Uppsala. In order to clarify the regiment's connection to the city, on 8 August 1904, the new name Upplands Artillery Regiment was awarded to the regiment.

In 1914, all order numbers within the Swedish Army were adjusted. For Uppland Artillery Regiment, this meant that the regiment was assigned the designation A 5. The adjustment of the designation made it possible to distinguish the regiments between the service branches and their possible reserve and duplication regiments.

On 12 October 1919, the Swedish Artillery Officer Candidate School (Artilleriets officersaspirantskola, ArtOAS) was added from being previously located in Kristianstad. Through the Defence Act of 1925, it was decided to reduce the army, which affected the regiment to the extent that it was disbanded in 1927. The regiment held a disbandment ceremony on 3 October 1927, and was disbanded officially on 31 December 1927. From 1 January 1928, the regiment operated as a decommissioning organization until 31 March 1928.

== Barracks and training areas ==
The regiment was initially placed at the 1st Svea Artillery Regiment on Vallhallavägen in Stockholm. On 12 October 1897, the regiment was moved to Storgatan and Kvarteret Krubban, where the regiment took over the barracks from the Life Guards of Horse (K 1), which moved to Lidingövägen.

On 21 September 1901, the regiment officially moved into a newly built barracks in Uppsala, and on 26 October 1901, a ceremony was held over the move. Initially, the regiment's barracks establishment in Uppsala consisted of a main building, which was built after the building program of the 1892 Army Order's Building Program. The chancellery was located in the middle and the accommodation in the barracks' wings. In 1908, two new barracks were erected and one chancellery building south of the regiment's main building. These three buildings were constructed after the building program of the 1901 Army Order. The barracks were erected in three floors instead of four floors as the type drawings showed. This made a characteristic feature of the regiment area, when it was constructed after two different building programs, and two different architectural styles.

After the regiment was disbanded, the barracks were taken over by the Swedish Army Non-Commissioned Officer School, which moved in on 10 September 1928. The Swedish Army Non-Commissioned Officer School became the first in the line of various school units that housed on Dag Hammarskjölds väg. The last school unit in the barracks area was the Swedish Army Company Officer School, which was disbanded on 30 September 1983. In 1986, the barracks were converted to Glunten's Research and Business Park, and the first tenant moved in. In 1994, Uppsala Science Park was established in close collaboration with the Foundation for Collaboration between the Universities in Uppsala, Business, and the Public Sector (STUNS).

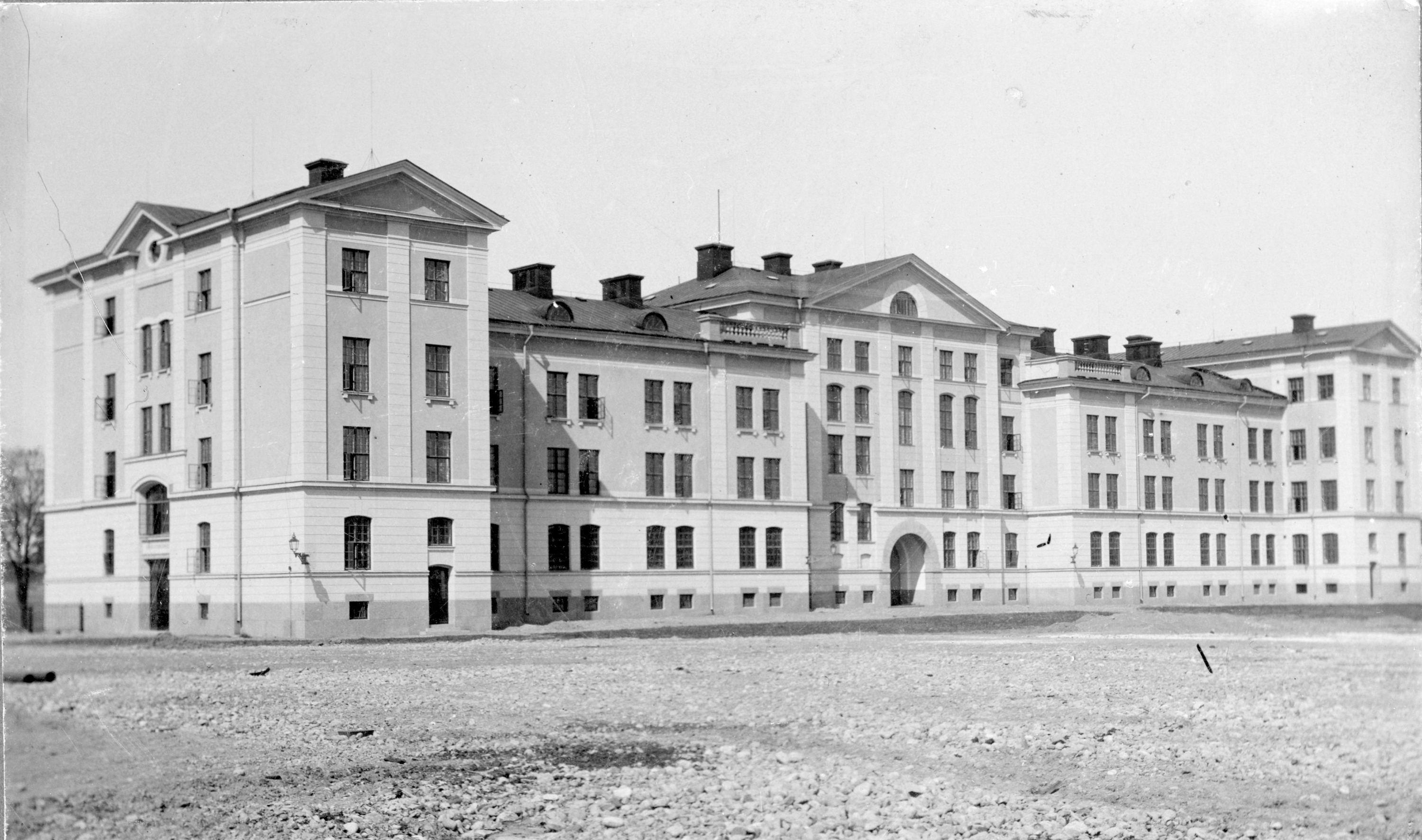
Main building, pictured in the 1910s.

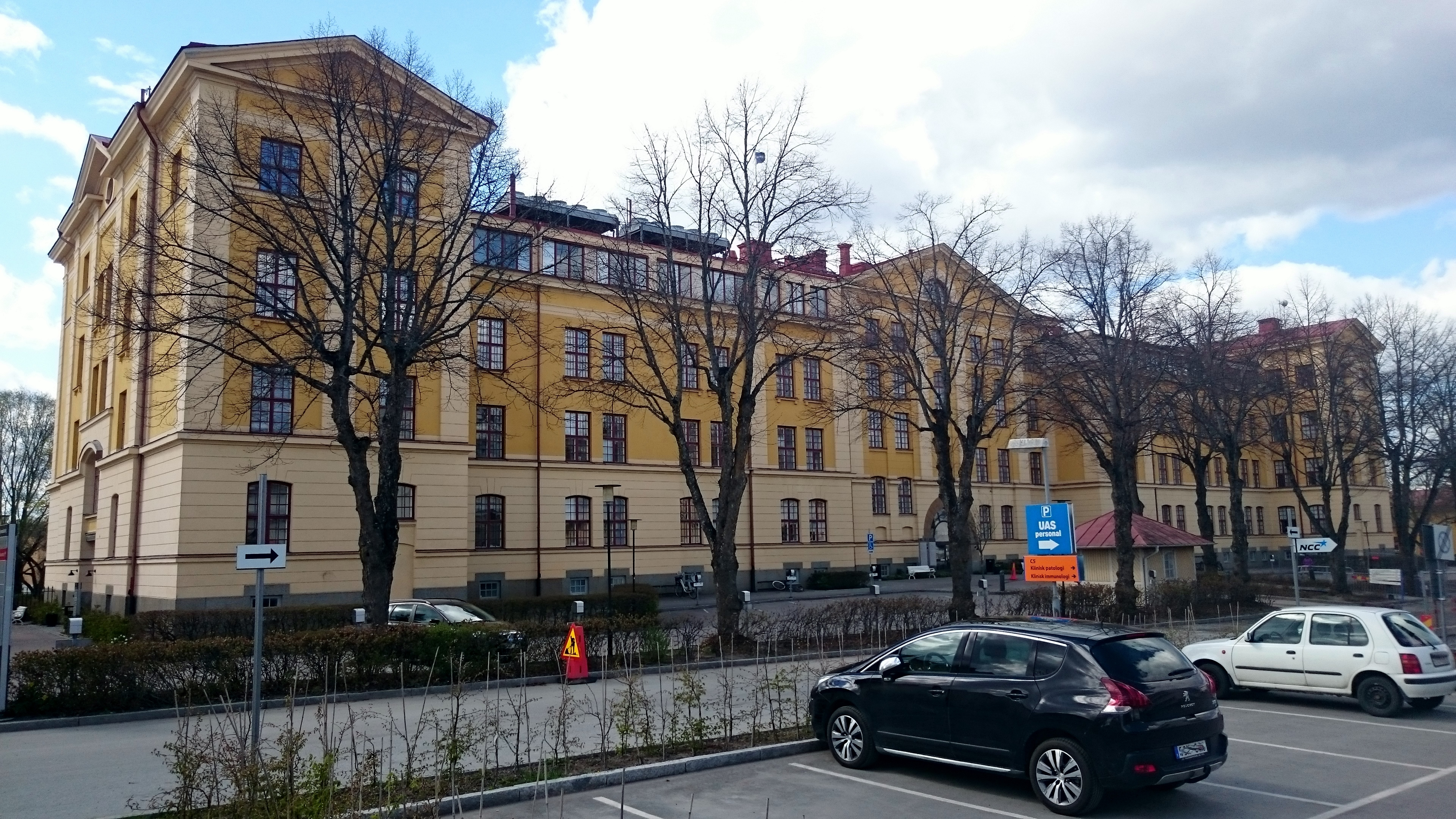
Main building, pictured in 2015.

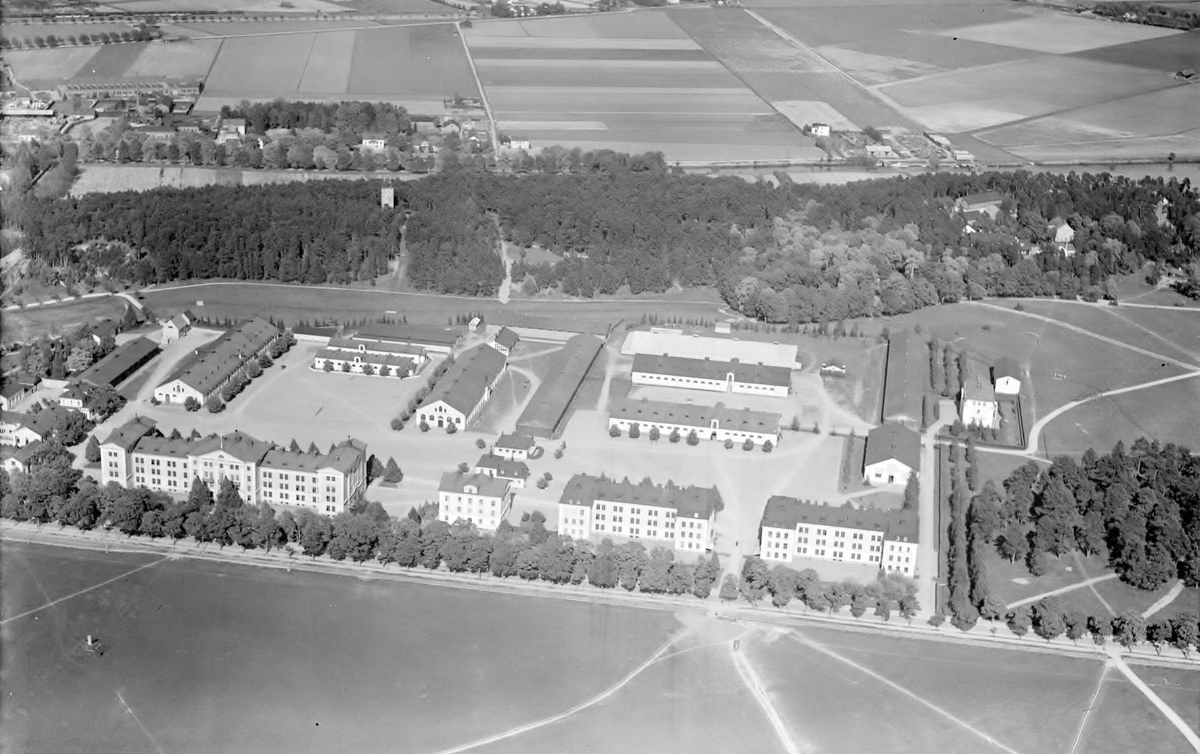
Aerial view of the barracks area in Uppsala in 1936.

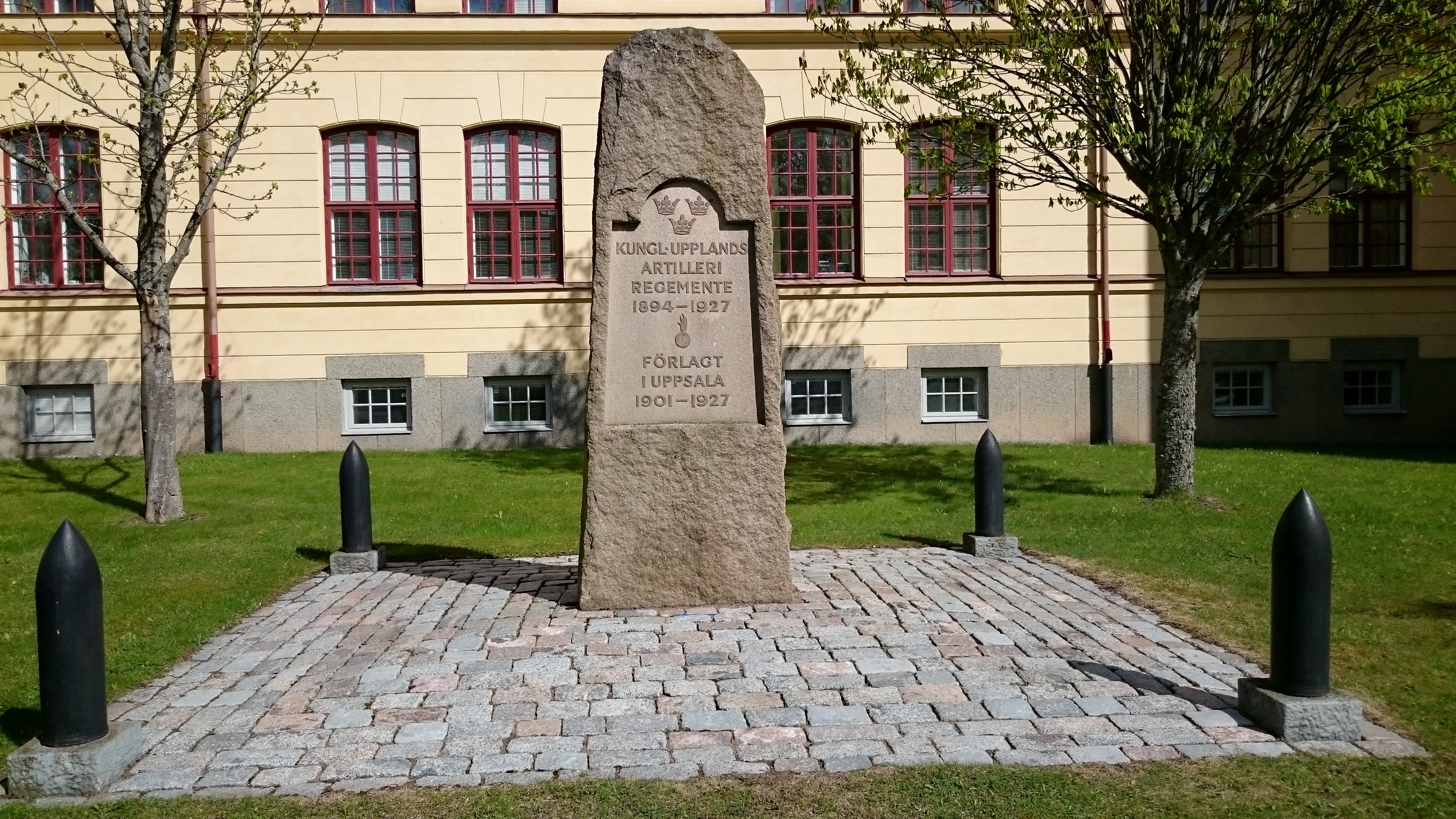
Memorial stone of the regimental presence in Uppsala.

== Heraldry and traditions ==
=== Heritage ===
In connection with the formation of the Artillery Regiment, it also came to preserve the memory of Uppland Artillery Regiment. Since 1 January 2006, there is no unit who specifically preserve the memory and the regimental traditions of Uppland Artillery Regiment.

=== Other ===
In connection with the formation of Norrbotten Artillery Corps on 1 January 1928, the corps came to take over the designation from Uppland Artillery Regiment (A 5). Norrbotten Artillery Corps also took over the regimental march, "Artillery V", also known as "Artillerimarsch" (G. Ström) and the regimental color, dark red. When Norrbotten Artillery Corps was disbanded and amalgamated into Boden Artillery Regiment (A 8), the Bergslagen Artillery Regiment (A 9) took over Uppland Artillery Regiment and Norrbotten Artillery Corps' march. It was adopted on 1 July 2000 by the Artillery Regiment (A 9).

== Commanding officers ==
Regimental commander from 1893 to 1927:

- 1893–1901: John Christian Bratt
- 1901–1903: Richard Ossbahr
- 1903–1905: Sune G:son Wennerberg
- 1905–1913: Hugo Ekström
- 1913–1919: Lars Sparre
- 1919–1927: Gerdt Lundeberg

== Names, designations and locations ==
Name	Translation	From		To
Kungl. Andra Svea artilleriregemente	Royal 2nd Svea Artillery Regiment	1894-10-01	–	1904-12-07
Kungl. Upplands artilleriregemente	Royal Uppland Artillery Regiment	1904-12-08	–	1927-12-31
Avvecklingsorganisation	Decommissioning Organization	1928-01-01	–	1928-03-31
Designation		From		To
No 5		1894-10-01	–	1914-09-30
A 5		1914-10-01	–	1927-12-31
Location		From		To
Stockholm Garrison		1894-10-01	–	1901-09-20
Uppsala Garrison		1901-09-21	–	1928-03-31

== See also ==
- List of Swedish artillery regiments
