= Korpral =

Rank in the Swedish Military

- Swedish Army Swedish Air force Swedish Navy
- Country: Sweden
- Service branch: Army; Air force; Navy
- NATO rank code: OR-4
- Next higher rank: Furir
- Next lower rank: Vicekorpral

Korpral is a Swedish military rank (OR-4).

== Duties ==
The Corporal is a Squad Leader at Skill Level A (Basic). The Corporal can serve either as a volunteer enlistee or as a national serviceman. Requirement for promotion to Corporal is completed squad leader training. Civil servants of the Armed Forces belonging to position level 8 wear Corporal's rank insignia when serving in uniform.

== History ==
A korpral was the leader of a korpralskap of 24 men during the Swedish allotment system (c. 1640 to 1901). The korpralskap consisted of four rotar (teams) of 6 men each. Each rote was led by a rotemästare (Gefreiter). Korpraler were non-commissioned officers in the cavalry (corporal of horse) before the reorganization of 1833/37, when cavalry corporals were given the rank of sergeant.

The corresponding rank in the artillery was konstapel ( bombardier), created as early as the 16th century. This rank was abolished in 1972.

== Earlier rank insignia ==
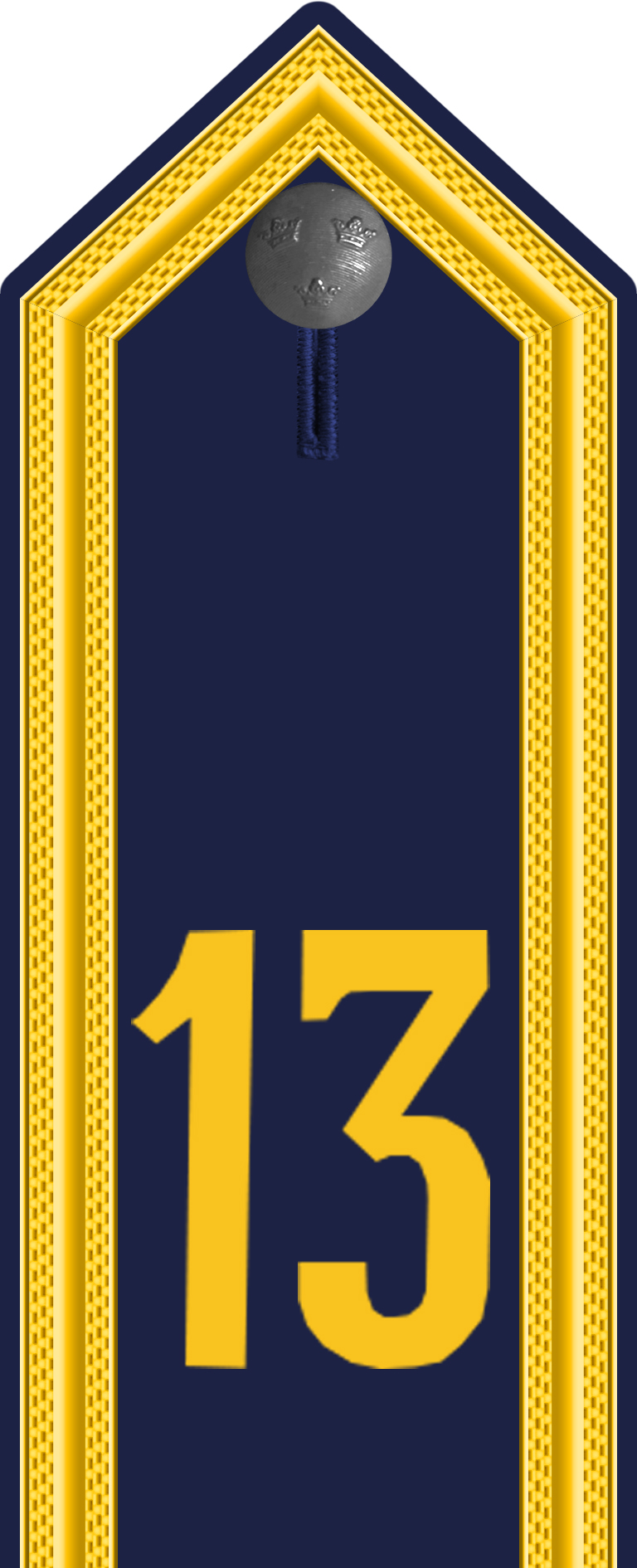
Army m/10

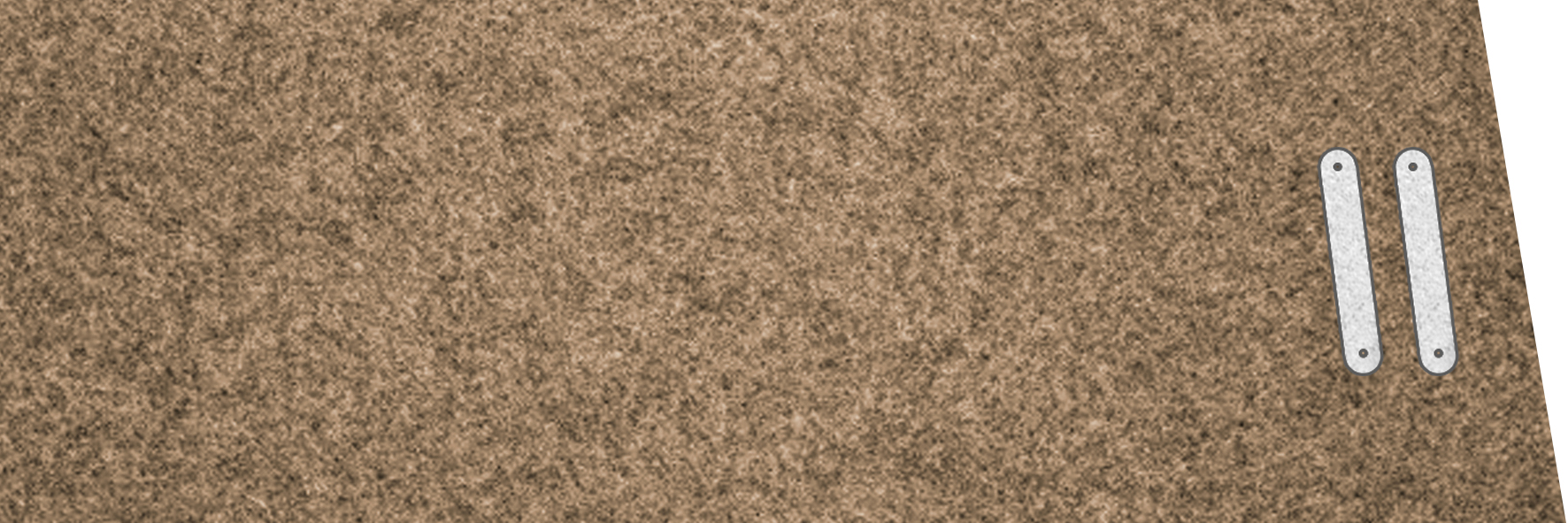
Army m/23

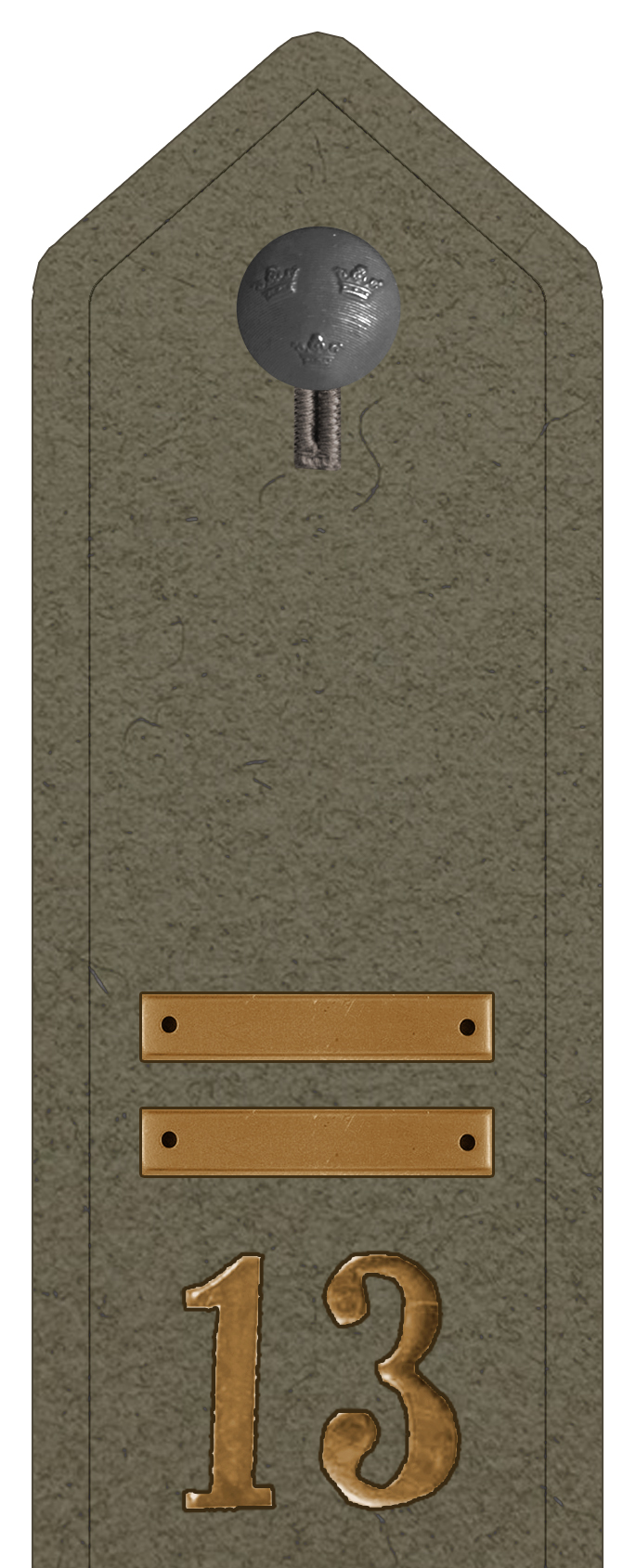
Army m/39

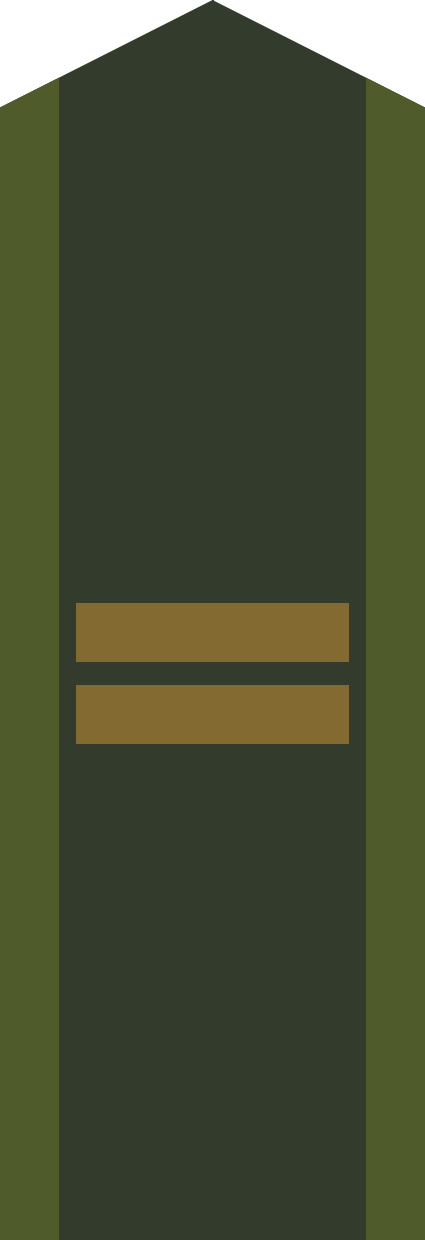
Collar patch m/58

Army 2009
