= Swedish field artillery (early 18th century) =

A Swedish foot (infantry) regiment during the 17th and 18th century was split into two battalions at the inception of a battle and light field artillery was usually put in the gaps that appeared between those battalions. This sort of artillery was categorized as regimental artillery.

== Organization ==
The Swedish field artillery consisted of 48 artillery pieces of caliber three to six pounds. The caliber was determined by the weight of the projectile rather than on the diameter of the pipe. There were 18 large 48 pounds pieces as well, but those were not used as regimental field artillery, but for more strategic purposes.

== Firing power ==
The artillery during the early 18th century was developed further by Carl Cronstedt. He combined the powder and projectile into one single thin wooden cartridge called "geschwinda" shots (fast shots) and thereby succeeding in increasing the firing power to 10-12 rounds per minute. In addition, he increased the explosive power of the projectile itself. The range of the 6 pounders was 600–700 meters and the 3 pounders 225 meters.

== Precision ==
Screws and aiming devices, invented by Christopher Polhem, were introduced and used to aim and adjust the elevation of the pipe.

== Mobility ==
To drag the pieces, personnel from a musketeer division were temporarily assigned to carry the piece by sticking a pole (marching poles) through the cannon. The crew joined in by rolling the tires forward. Alternatively and/or in addition, a number of two horses (action horses) were used to pull the piece forward. Those horses were used as close as 70 meters from enemy lines. At closer ranges, only manpower was used to move it forward. In this manner the piece could advance at the rate of 1/2 or less of the foot regiment.

== Operation ==
To serve a three to six pound piece, a minimum of four artillery men was required: one to put the geshwinda shot into the cannon, another to ram the shot down the barrel, a third to mount the fuse, and a fourth to fire the piece by a torch. The team was overseen by a konstapel, who was to make sure that the whole aiming, loading and firing cycle should complete within five or six seconds.

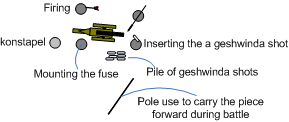

== Tactics ==
The batteries opened fire when enemy lines reached 200 meters and continued until the range from the enemies relative to the regiment was 150 meters. At that point, artillery pieces were moved forward 25 meters to a new position and so on. Since the advancement speed of the artillery was 1/2 times of the regiment, the distance between them were exponentially increased making the firing angle to shrink accordingly. At the time artillery had advanced 50 meters, own battalions had advanced an additional distance of 100 meters and ready for their first musketeer salvo now with the artillery positioned 100 meters back.

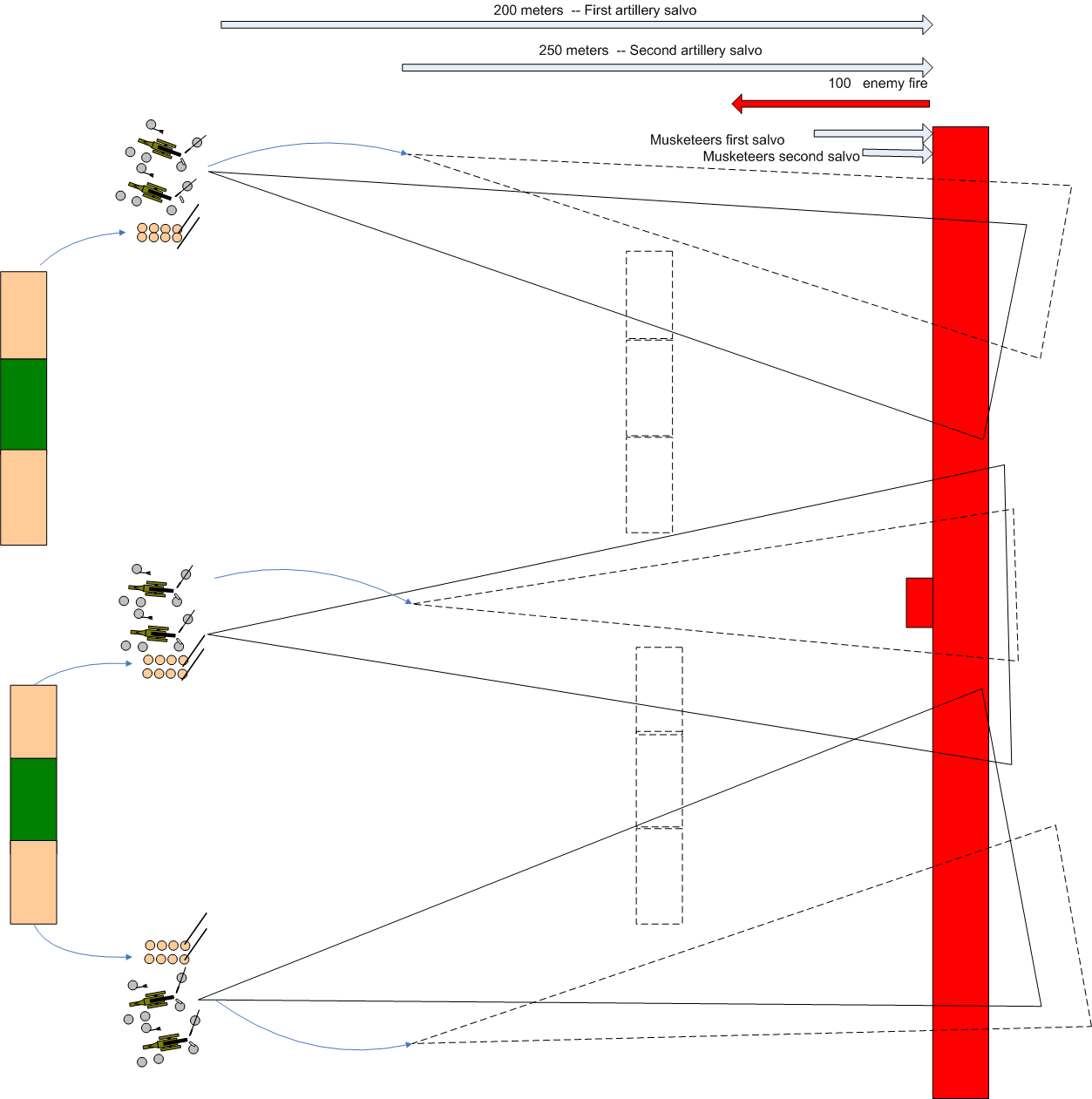

== See also ==
- Swedish allotment system
- Great Northern War
