= Vicekorpral =

- Army Air force Navy
- Country: Sweden
- Service branch: Army; Air force; Navy
- NATO rank code: OR-3
- Next higher rank: Korpral
- Next lower rank: Menig

Vicekorpral (vicekonstapel in the artillery) is a Swedish rank above menig and below korpral that existed until 1972 as a trainee rank for conscripts who were undertaking training to become deputy squad leaders or squad leaders. The rank was reintroduced 2009 to denote soldiers at OR-3 level.

== History ==
=== Insignias before 1972 ===
Army	Air force	Navy

== See also ==
- Finnish military ranks
- Military ranks of the Swedish armed forces
- Swedish Armed Forces
