= Korpralskap =

Swedish and Finnish military unit

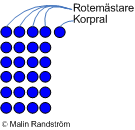
Formation

Korpralskap is a Swedish/Finnish military unit of 25 men split into four rote with six man each that existed during the 17th and 18th century—quite similar to a platoon today. The unit was led by a Korpral and in turn consisted of four rotes of six men each. Each rote was led by a rotemaster. A foot (infantry) company consisted of two piker and four musketeer korpralskaps.

== Formation ==
During marching the unit was formed into four columns with the Korpral at the right side of the front. Rotemasters marched in front of each rote and communicated with the Korpral.

== See also ==
- Swedish allotment system
- Carolines Battalion
