= Swedish Army Company Officer School =

- Arméns kompaniofficersskola
- Active: 1926–1983
- Country: Sweden
- Allegiance: Swedish Armed Forces
- Branch: Swedish Army
- Type: School
- Role: NCO training (1926–1972); CO training (1972–1983)
- Part of: Ast (1926–1960); S 1 (1960–1983)
- Garrison/HQ: Uppsala

Insignia
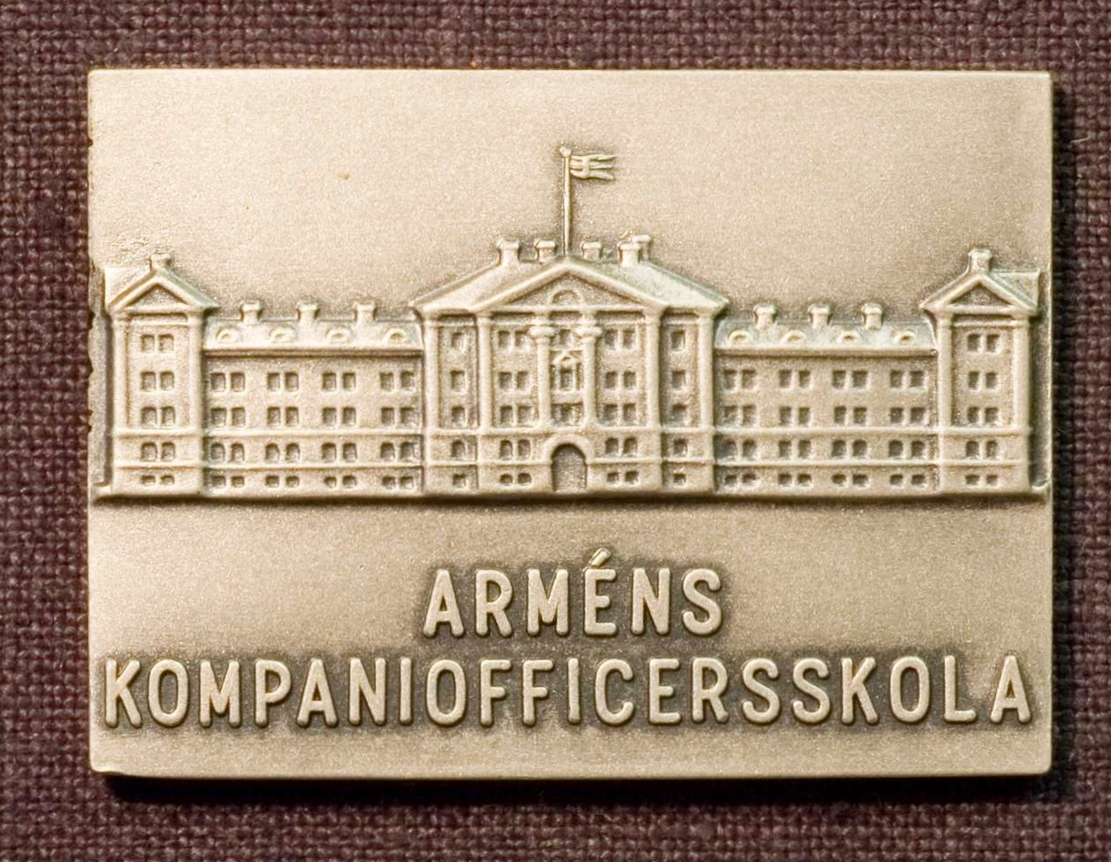
- Commemorative plaquette

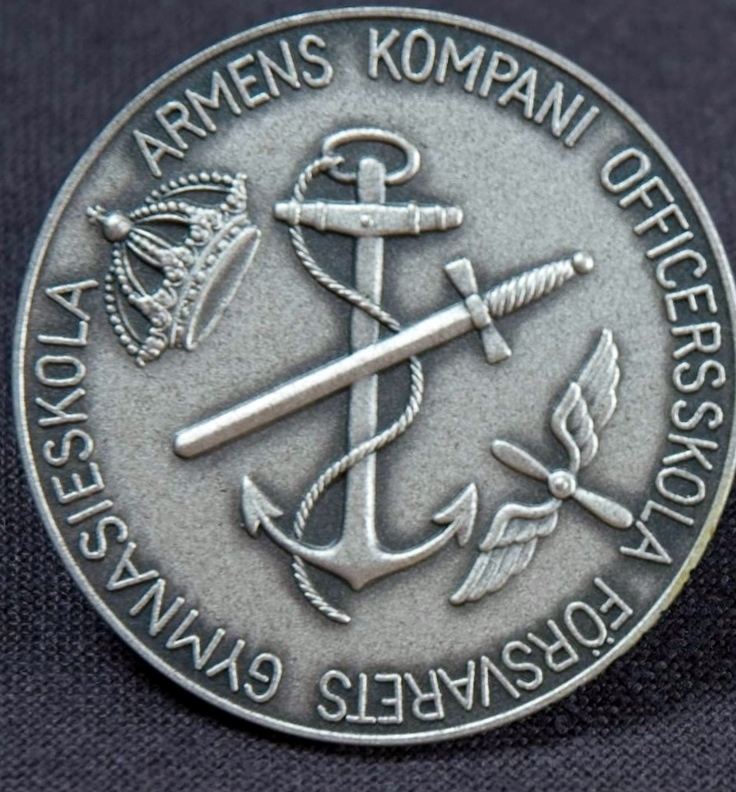
- Commemorative medal

Swedish Army Company Officer School (Swedish: Arméns kompaniofficersskola, AKS) was a Swedish Army school unit formed in 1926 as the Swedish Army Non-Commissioned Officer School (Swedish: Arméns underofficersskola, AUS). From 1926 to 1972, it trained active non-commissioned officers in the Swedish Army into warrant officers. In 1972, the school changed name and after that trained platoon leaders in the Swedish Army into company officers until the school was disbanded in 1983.

== History ==
Through the Defence Act of 1925, it was decided that the Swedish Army's education of non-commissioned officers would be centralized to a school, the Swedish Army Non-Commissioned Officer School (Arméns underofficersskola, AUS), which was formed on 1 July 1926 in Stockholm. Before the formation of the school, the non-commissioned training in the army had taken place in the different service branches. Initially, the school was co-located with Göta Life Guards (I 2) in Stockholm. Because Uppland Artillery Regiment (A 5) was disbanded through the Defence Act of 1925, the Swedish Army Non-Commissioned Officer School was transferred to Uppsala and took over the barracks establishment from Uppland Artillery Regiment. At the school, a 3-year general education program for permanent employees of the army and the Swedish Coastal Artillery was organized. The training was conducted in three different programs. Program 1 included supplementary training for future non-commissioned officers. Program 2 for the completion of realexamen (graduation from Realskola). Program 3 for "limited" studentexamen.

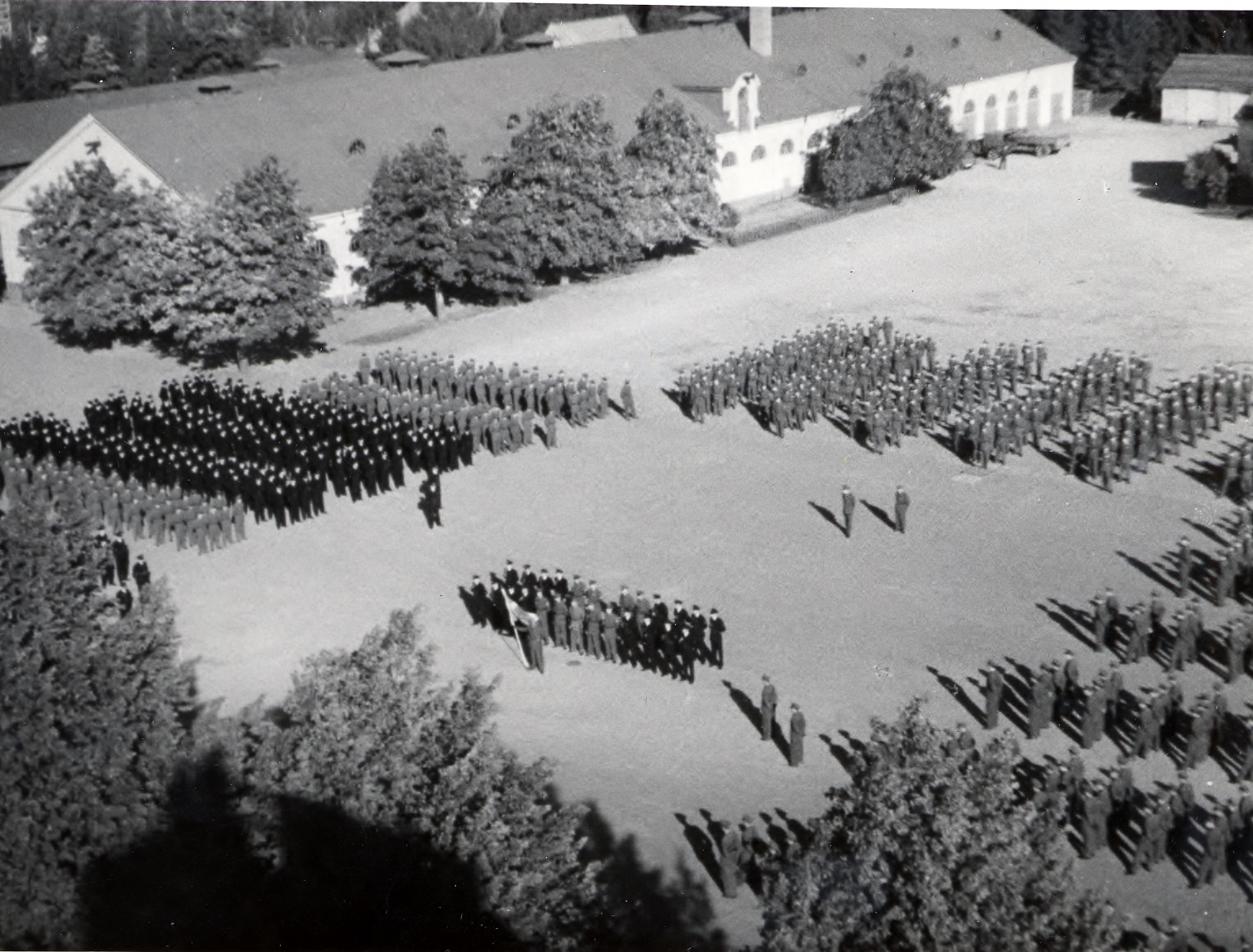
Hand over to the commander at the Swedish Army Non-Commissioned Officer School in Uppsala in 1949.

In 1944, the Swedish Armed Forces School for Secondary Education was established and students from all service branches were given the opportunity to receive a realexamen or studentexamen. At the school, there was also room for the Technical Program of the Swedish Navy. The Swedish Army Non-Commissioned Officer School was reorganized to include the non-commissioned officer's course, as well as a boarding school for the students at the Swedish Armed Forces School for Secondary Education. In 1950, the Commissariat Program ended at the non-commissioned officer's course. In 1952, training of conscripts staff assistants in the army was added. In 1955, training of conscript interpreters was added to the Swedish Army Non-Commissioned Officer School. In 1960, the training was changed at the non-commissioned officer's course according to the guidelines that were contributed by the 1954 Officer's Investigation (1954 års befälsutredning). Among other things, the quartermaster training ceased in favor of training in combat technology and troop command. In 1960, the Swedish Army Non-Commissioned Officer School was subordinated to the Uppland Signal Regiment (S 1) in regards of administration, except for the commissariat service and the health service. In 1966, the training of conscripts staff assistants and interpreters was transferred to the newly organized Swedish Army School of Staff Work and Communications (Arméns stabs- och sambandsskola, StabSbS). In 1967, the commissariat service was subordinate to S 1. In 1972, the Swedish Army Non-Commissioned Officer School changed its name to the Swedish Army Company Officer School in connection with the introduction of a new service system in the entire Swedish Armed Forces.

In 1973, the Swedish government presented its bill on organizational issues concerning the army. The Swedish Armed Forces Peace Organization Investigation (Försvarets fredsorganisationsutredning, FFU) had investigated various issues regarding the location of the army schools and units. Among other things, the FFU had carried out an extensive investigation into the new location for the Swedish Army Company Officer School. Eight garrisons had been investigated for the purpose of relocating the school, four of these towns, Karlstad, Linköping, Skövde and Örebro, were considered to have better conditions than the others. The Örebro alternative was considered to be the most economically advantageous, and also that a move from Uppsala Garrison to Örebro Garrison could be made quite immediately. Since several referral bodies were anxious to move the school from Uppsala promptly, both the Supreme Commander and the Chief of the Army suggested that the school be located in Örebro. The government, however, considered that the Swedish Army Company Officer School would be relocated to Skövde, partly because of regional policy reasons, but also because of the FFU had investigated the possibilities of coordinating the Swedish Army Company Officer School with other schools to a larger school unit in Skövde. Hence, the government proposed to the Riksdag in its bill that the school be located in Skövde. However, the school never moved from Uppsala, but was disbanded on 30 September 1983 in connection with the Ny befälsordning ("New Command System") reform.

On 25 August 1983, the last graduation was held at the school. On 30 September 1983, a closing ceremony was held. The traditions of the Swedish Army Company Officer School were taken over by the Military Academy Karlberg. Among other things, portraits of all commanding officers and some memorabilia were handed over to the Military Academy Karlberg.

== Barracks and training areas ==
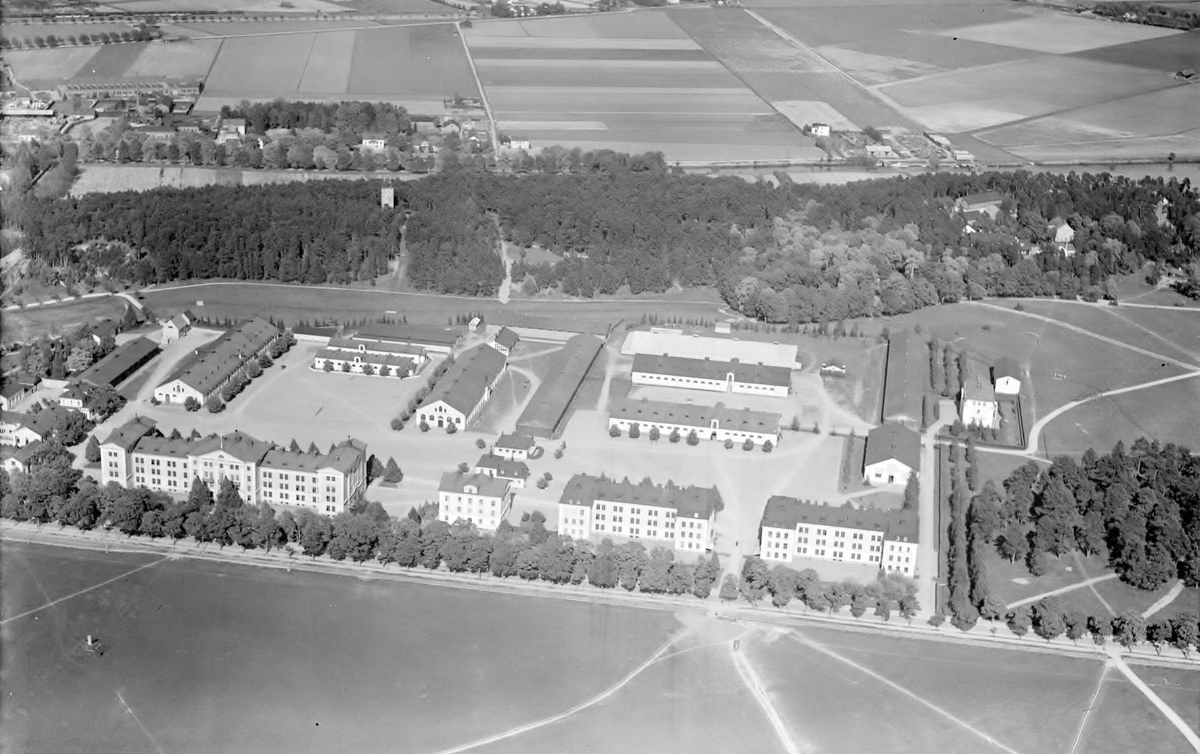
Aerial view of Swedish Army Non-Commissioned Officer School and former Uppland Artillery Regiment in Uppsala in 1936.

When the school was formed it was co-located with Göta Life Guard (I 1) at the barracks establishment on Linnégatan in Stockholm. However, the school office was from 10 July 1926 located at Engelbrektsgatan 5 and from 15 September 1926 at Riddargatan 13. From 10 September 1928, the entire school was transferred to Uppsala where they took over the barracks establishment from Uppland Artillery Regiment at the then Stockholmsvägen (present-day Dag Hammarskjölds väg). The barracks establishment that was originally built for the artillery had been built after two different building programs and two different architectural styles. Initially, the barracks establishment consisted of a main building, which was erected after the building program of the 1892 Army Order, where the chancery was located in the middle and the military dormitories in the barracks' wings. In 1908, two new barracks were erected and one chancery building south of the regiment's main building. These three buildings were constructed after the building program of the 1901 Army Order. The barracks were erected in three floors instead of four floors as the type drawings showed. The fact that the barracks establishment was built after two different building programs with two different architects, gave a characteristic feature of the barracks establishment. From 1982, parts of the barracks establishment at Polacksbacken were taken over, in connection with Uppland Regiment moving to Enköping.

== Commanding officers ==
The commanding officer was referred to as skolchef ("school chief") and had rank of colonel.

- 1926–1932: G Bratt
- 1932–1936: ?
- 1936–1939: R R Gyllenram
- 1939–1940: Sven Rymann
- 1941–1942: Stellan d´Orschimont
- 1942–1946: C H Bergren
- 1946–1948: Erik Sellin
- 1948–1950: Axel Grewell
- 1950–1954: Fritz-Ivar Virgin
- 1954–1957: K G Samuelsson
- 1957–1965: Karl Eklund
- 1965–1968: Lage Wernstedt
- 1968–1972: Per-Hugo Winberg
- 1972–1974: Bengt Selander
- 1974–1977: Hodder Stjernswärd
- 1977–1983: Stig Barke

== Names, designations and locations ==
Name	Translation	From		To
Arméns underofficersskola	[Swedish] Army Warrant Officers’ School [Swedish] Army Noncommissioned Officers’ School [Swedish] Army Non-Commissioned Officer (NCO) School	1926-07-01	–	1972-06-30
Arméns kompaniofficersskola	[Swedish] Army Company Officer School	1972-07-01	–	1983-09-30
Designation		From		To
AUS		1926-07-01	–	1972-06-30
AKS		1972-07-01	–	1983-09-30
Location		From		To
Stockholm Garrison		1926-07-01	–	1928-09-09
Uppsala Garrison		1928-09-10	–	1983-09-30
